= List of companies based in Oregon =

Largest public corporations headquartered in Oregon
Corporation	Headquarters	Market cap (million)
1. Nike, Inc.	near Beaverton	$32,039
2. Precision Castparts Corp.	Portland	$16,158
3. FLIR Systems	Wilsonville	$4,250
4. StanCorp Financial Group	Portland	$2,495
5. Radius Recycling	Portland	$1,974
6. Portland General Electric	Portland	$1,737
7. Columbia Sportswear	near Beaverton	$1,593
8. Northwest Natural Gas	Portland	$1,287

This is a list of companies based in Oregon. Oregon is the ninth largest by area and the 27th most populous of the 50 United States. The gross domestic product (GDP) of Oregon in 2010 was $168.6 billion; it is the United States's 26th wealthiest state by GDP. The state's per capita personal income in 2010 was $44,447.

Oregon has one of the largest salmon-fishing industries in the world, although ocean fisheries have reduced the river fisheries in recent years. The state is home to many breweries, and Portland has the largest number of breweries of any city in the world. High technology industries and services have been major employers since the 1970s. Tektronix was the largest private employer in Oregon until the late 1980s. Intel's creation and expansion of several facilities in eastern Washington County continued the growth that Tektronix had started. Intel is now the state's largest for-profit private employer, with more than 17,000 employees, while Providence Health & Services, a nonprofit, is the largest private employer.

== Companies currently based in Oregon ==
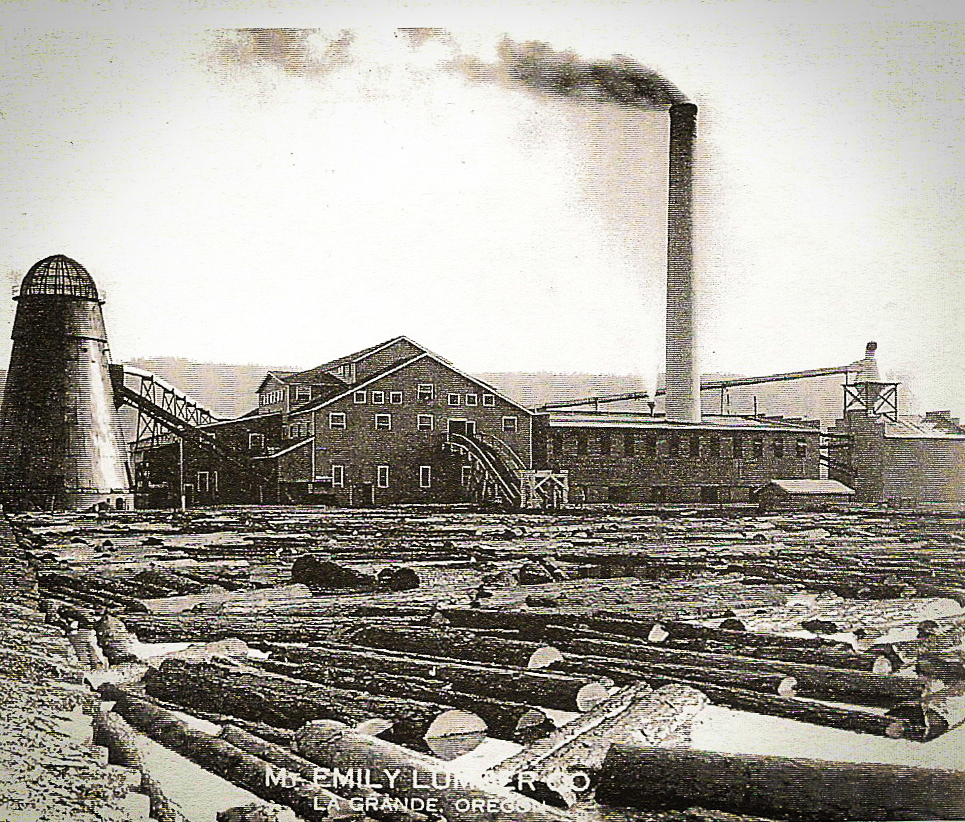
Early 1920s photograph of the Mount Emily Lumber Company

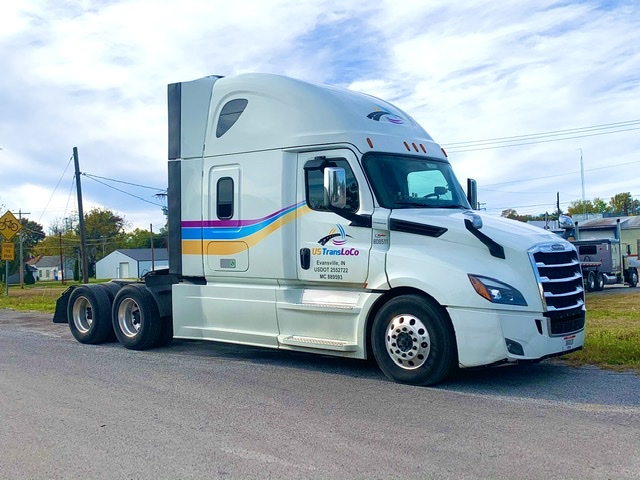
A Freightliner truck

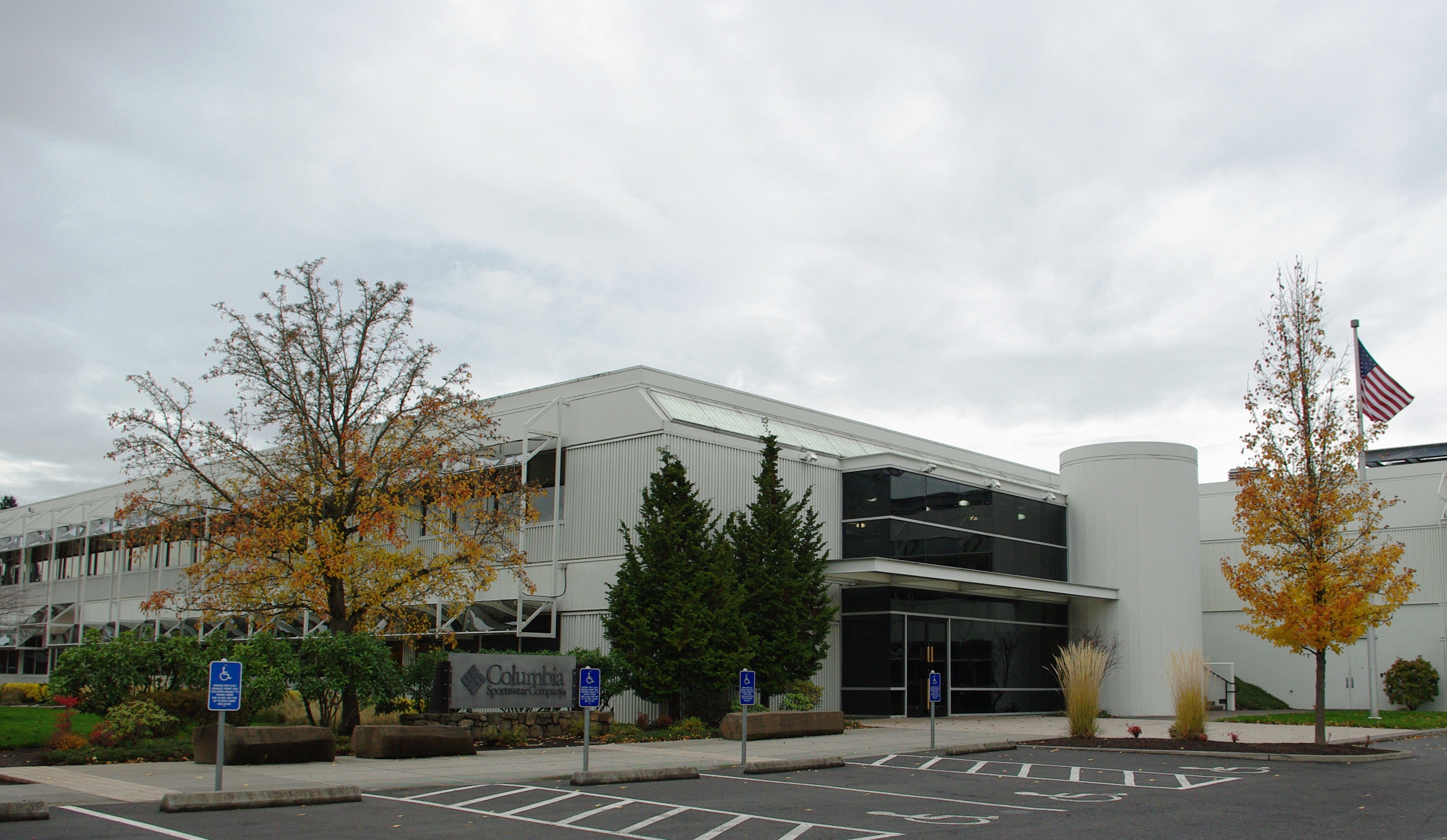
Columbia Sportswear's company headquarters in Washington County, Oregon

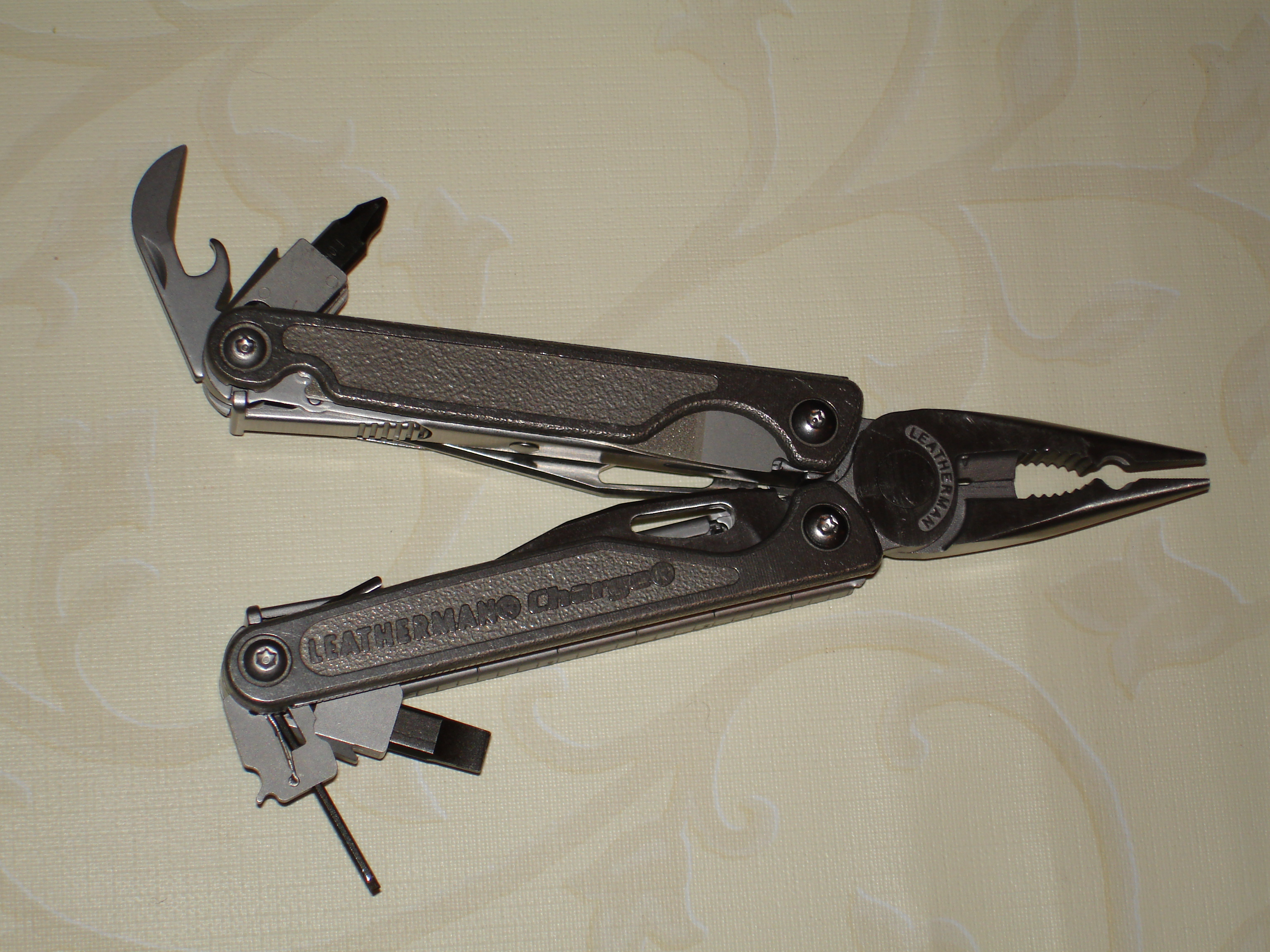
A Leatherman product

=== 0-9 ===
- 1859 magazine

=== A ===
- A-dec
- Acumed
- Aftermath Media
- Airblaster
- Al Mar Knives
- American Blimp Corporation
- Arcimoto
- Aspen Capital
- Avia
- Axium

=== B ===
- Benchmade
- Bend Studio
- Bent Image Lab
- Better World Club
- BioSphere Plastic
- Blackstone Audio
- Bob's Red Mill
- Bonfire Snowboarding
- Breedlove Guitars
- Burley Design
- Bustos Media

=== C ===
- Calico Light Weapons Systems
- Cambia Health Solutions
- Cascade Microtech
- CD Baby
- Clean Edge
- Click Commerce
- Co-Motion Cycles
- CodePen
- CollegeNET
- The Collins Companies
- Columbia River Knife & Tool
- Columbia Sportswear
- Crafty Games
- Croman Corporation

=== D ===
- Daimler Truck North America
- Danner Boots
- Dark Horse Comics
- DAT Solutions
- Dave's Killer Bread
- DeMarini
- DH Press
- Digimarc
- Digital Trends
- Discogs

=== E ===
- E&F Miler Industries
- Eagle Newspapers
- Electro Scientific Industries
- EllisLab
- Emmert International
- Erickson Inc.
- ESCO Group
- Extensis

=== F ===
- Falcon Northwest
- FEI Company, now part of Thermo Fisher Scientific
- FLIR Systems
- Freightliner Trucks
- The Fruit Company

=== G ===
- Gene Tools
- Gerber Legendary Blades
- Gothic Beauty
- Grace Bio-Labs
- Grange Cooperative
- Great Cats World Park
- The Greenbrier Companies
- Grenade Gloves
- Greyday Productions
- Ground Kontrol

=== H ===
- Harry & David
- Harvest House
- Hawthorne Books
- Hedgebrook
- Heitman Analytics
- Holiday Rambler
- Home Power
- House Spirits Distillery
- The Human Bean
- Hydroflask

=== I ===
- Image3D
- Imputor?
- InFocus

=== J ===
- Janrain
- Jantzen

=== K ===
- Keen
- Kershaw Knives
- Kettle Foods
- Kill Rock Stars
- KinderCare Learning Centers

=== L ===
- LaCrosse Footwear
- Laika
- Lattice Semiconductor
- Leatherman
- Leupold & Stevens
- Lithia Motors
- Little Big Burger

=== M ===
- Mentor Graphics
- MetroPaint
- Miller Paint
- MotoCzysz

=== N ===
- Nemo Design
- Next Adventure
- Nike, Inc.
- Nosler
- NuScale Power

=== O ===
- OlsenDaines
- Omega Morgan
- Oni Press
- Oregon Scientific
- Oregon Venture Fund
- Organically Grown Company
- Out'n'About

=== P ===
- Pacific Northwest Wrestling
- PacStar
- Panic
- Phoseon Technology
- Planar Systems
- Plazm
- Portland and Western Railroad
- Portland Incubator Experiment
- Pronto Pup
- Puppet

=== R ===
- R/West
- Radisys
- Reddaway
- Rentrak
- Rodda Paint
- Rodgers Instruments
- Roseburg Forest Products

=== S ===
- Salomon Snowboards
- SawStop
- Second Story Interactive Studios
- Shaver Transportation Company
- Shoe Goo
- Smarsh
- SmartCAM
- Soloflex
- Sports Management Worldwide
- Standard Insurance
- Stohr Cars
- Storables
- Swanson Group Aviation

=== T ===
- Tara Labs
- Tec Laboratories
- Tektronix
- TerraCycle
- Teufel Nursery
- Thomas Kemper
- Thrustmaster
- Tillamook County Creamery Association
- Timeless Media Group
- TMT Development
- Toonlet
- TopoQuest
- Trapit
- Trusted Computing Group
- Turtledove Clemens

=== U ===
- Umpqua Bank
- Umpqua Research Company
- United Bicycle Institute

=== V ===
- Vajra Enterprises
- Vanport Manufacturing
- Vari-Prop
- VeriWave
- Vernier Software & Technology

=== W ===
- Webtrends
- Western Communications
- Windward Performance

=== Z ===
- ZoomCare

== By type ==
=== Aircraft and airlines ===
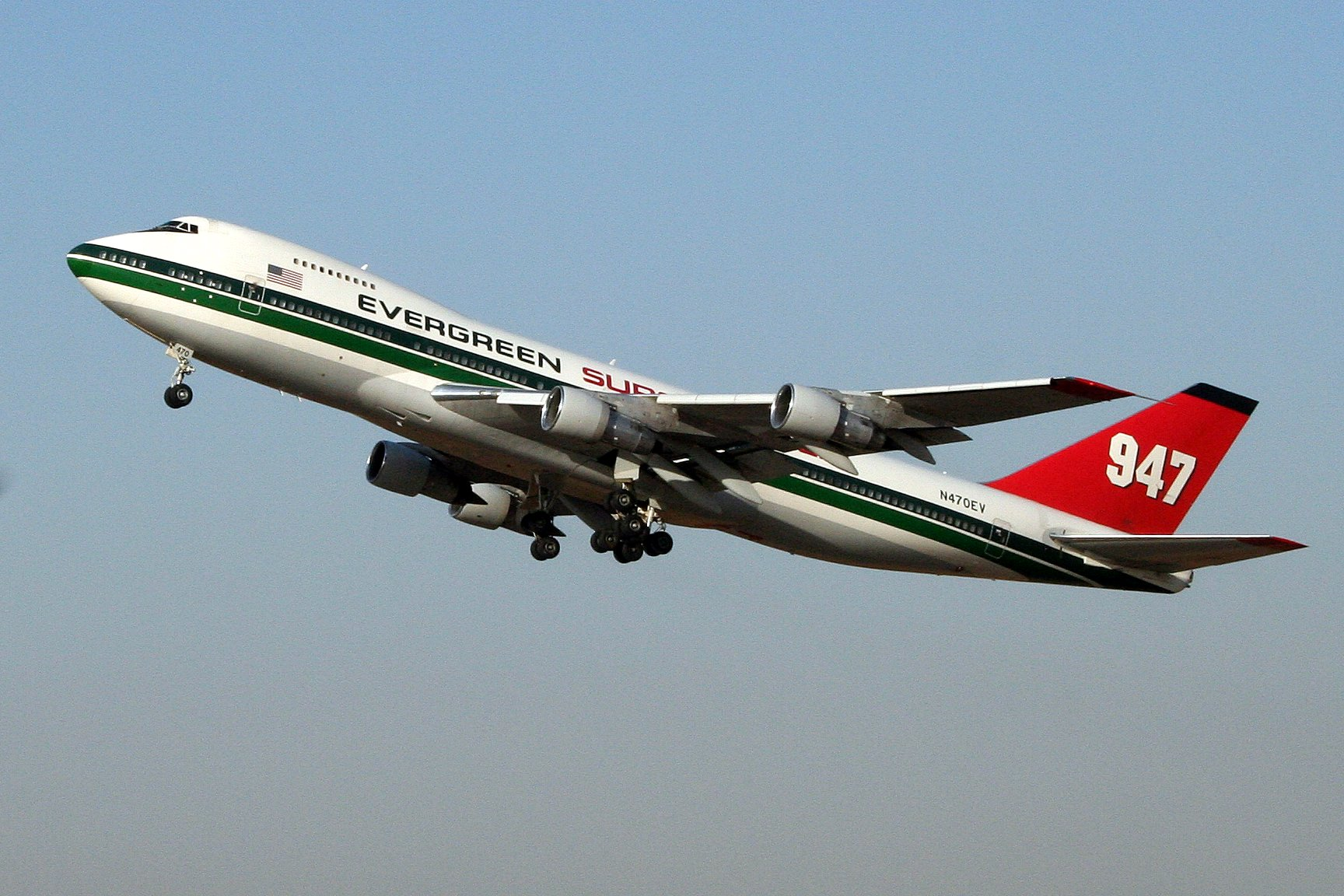
An Evergreen International Airlines 747 Supertanker departs Ben Gurion Airport, Israel (2007).

- Columbia Helicopters
- Epic Aircraft
- Erickson Inc.
- Van's Aircraft

=== Amusement parks ===
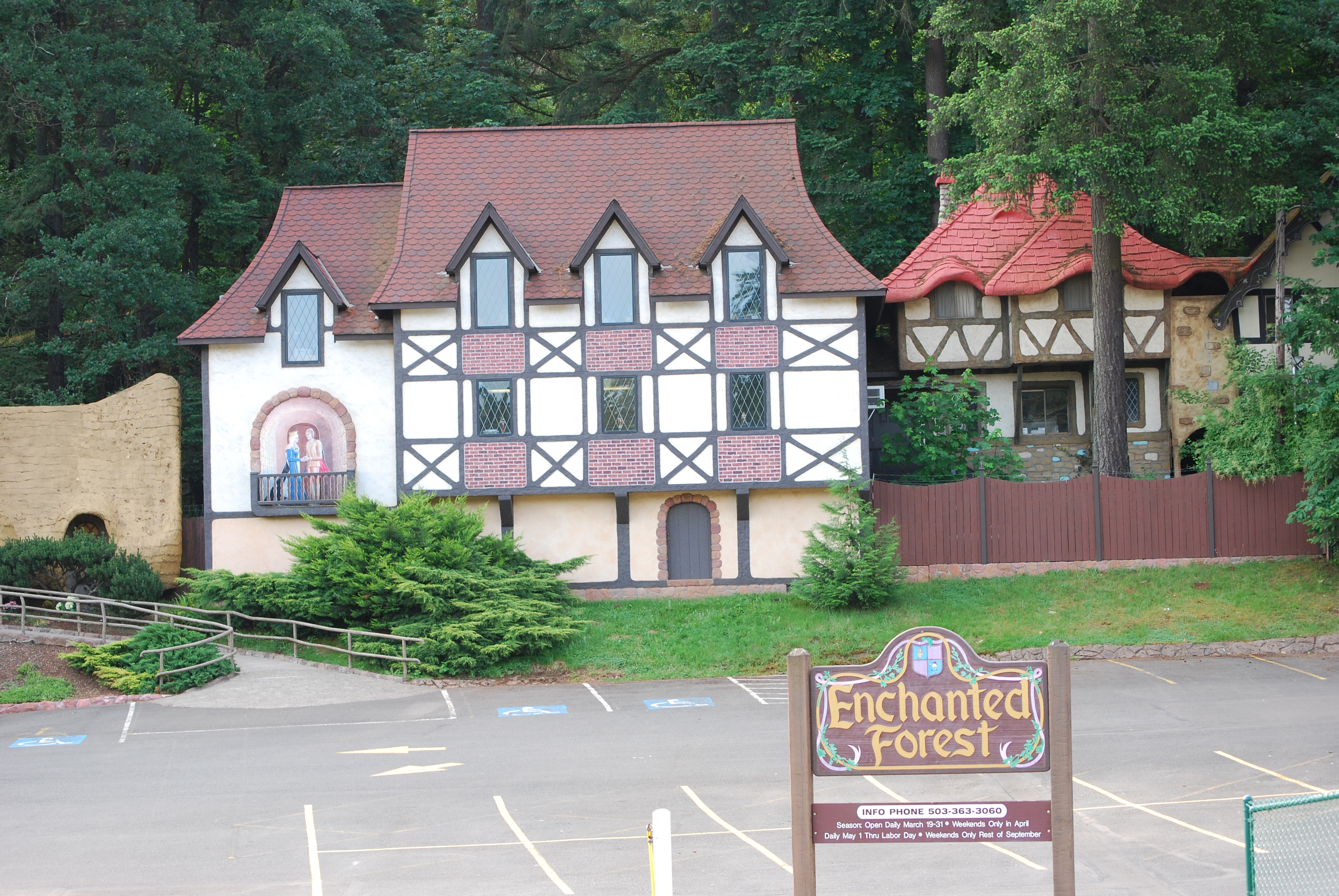
The entrance to Enchanted Forest, located in Turner

- Enchanted Forest
- Oaks Amusement Park

=== Design firms ===
- Bora Architects
- ZGF Architects LLP

=== Banks ===
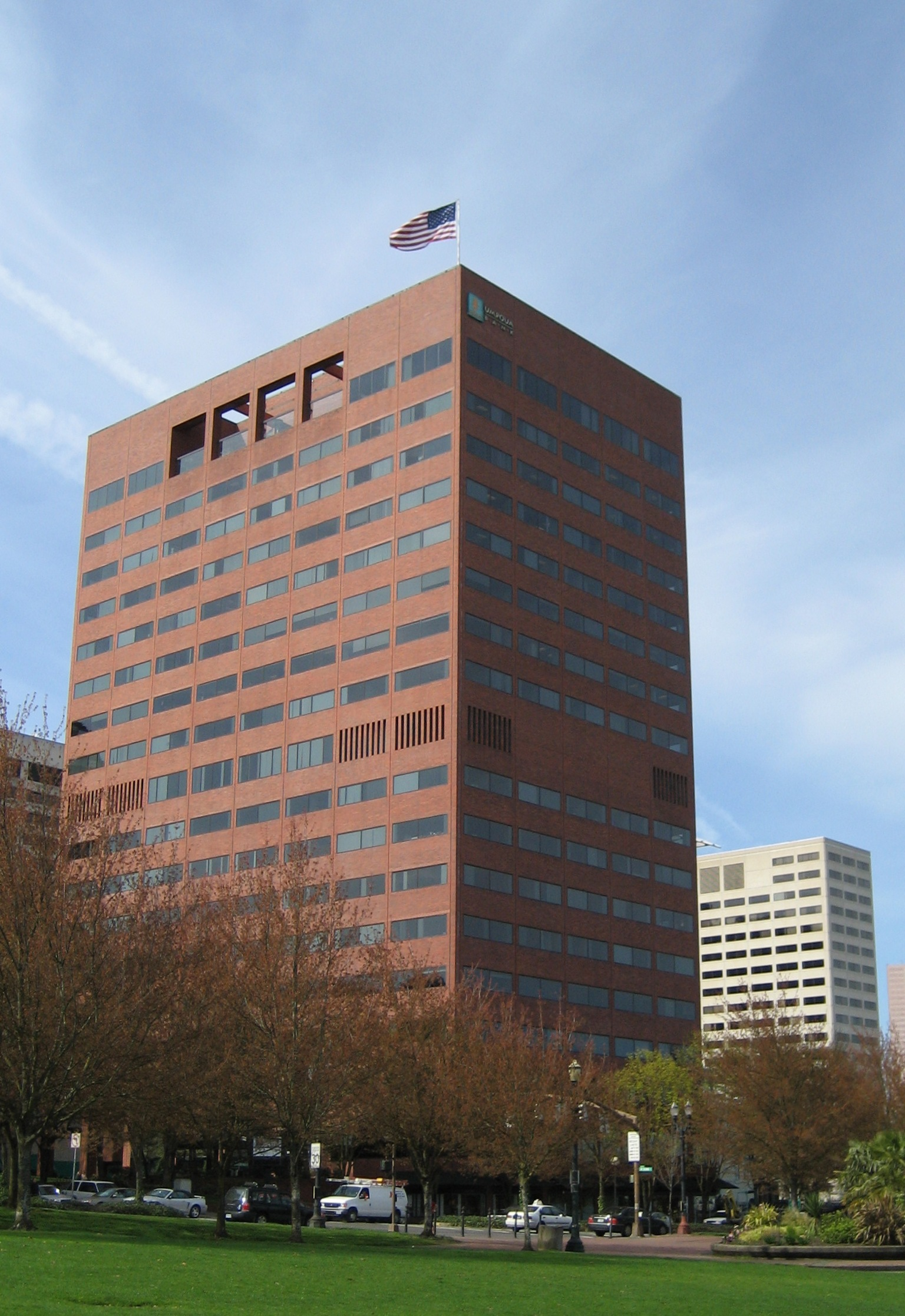
Umpqua Holdings Corporation company headquarters in Portland

- Aspen Capital
- Community Bank
- Umpqua Holdings Corporation

=== Clothing ===
==== Current ====
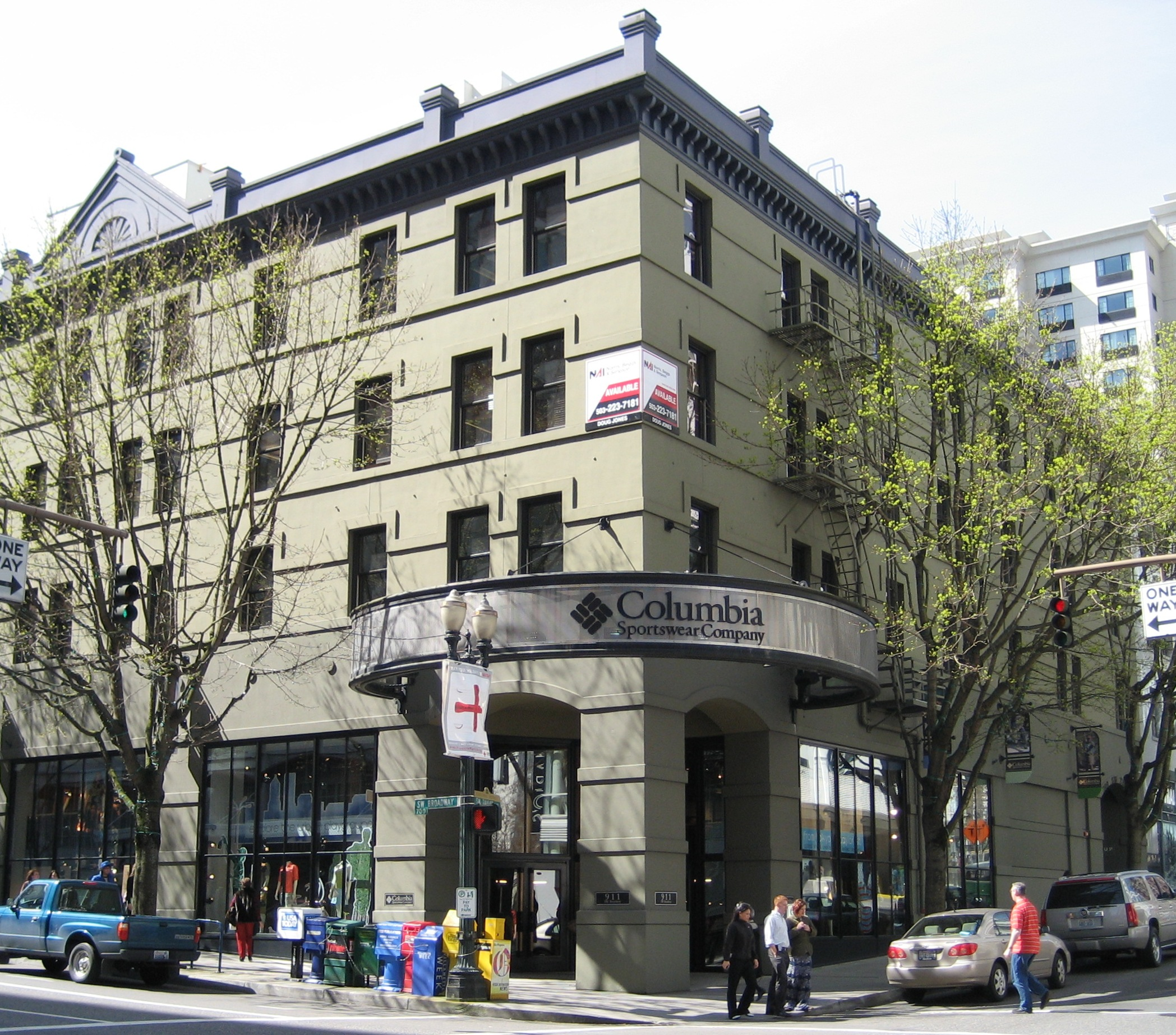
Columbia's flagship store in downtown Portland, Oregon

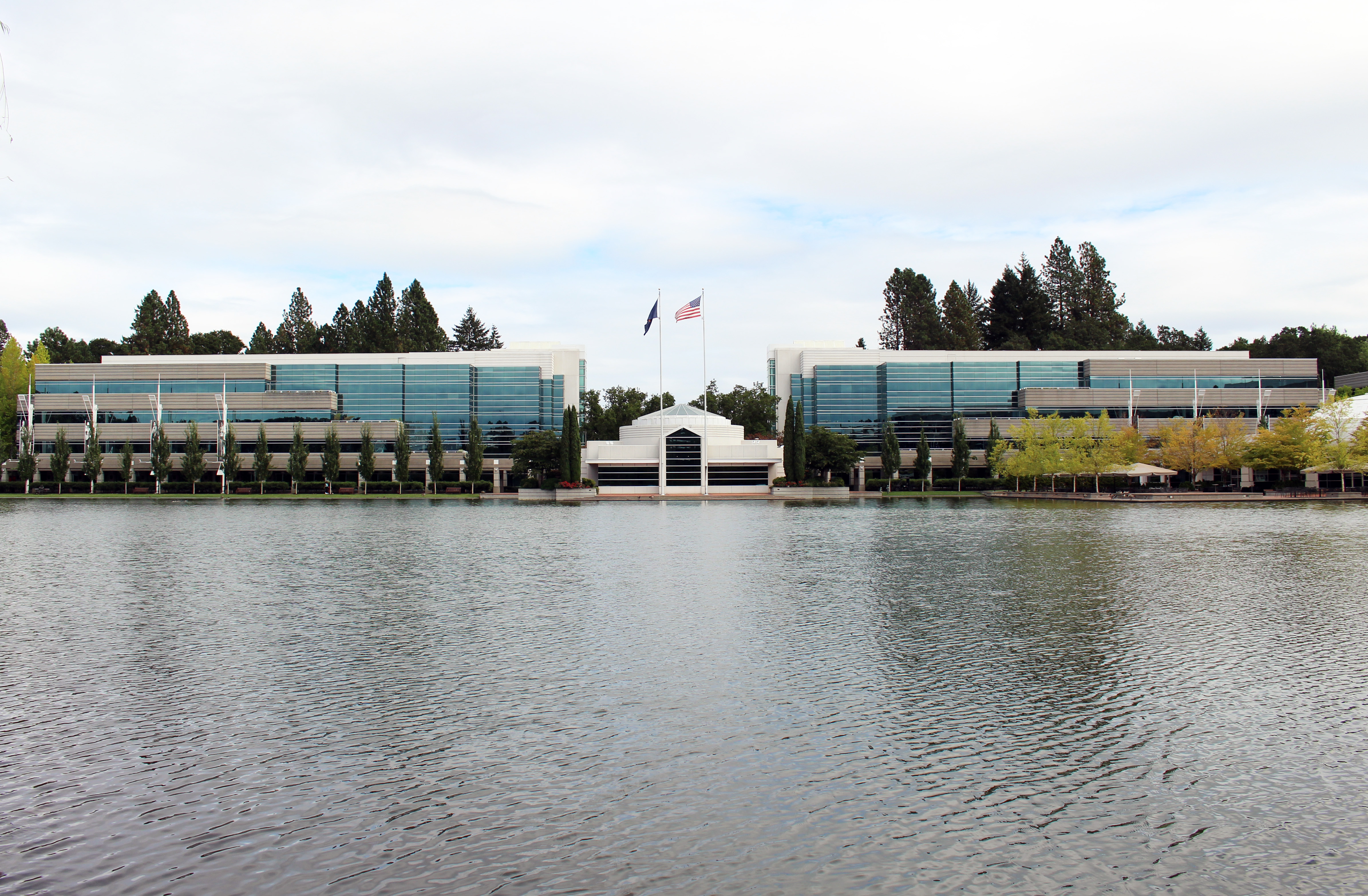
Nike World Headquarters near Beaverton, Oregon

- Columbia Sportswear
- Grenade Gloves
- Keen
- LaCrosse Footwear
- Nau
- Nike, Inc.
- Pendleton Woolen Mills
- Portland Gear
- Sock It To Me
- Hanna Andersson

==== Former ====
- Lucy Activewear
- Holden Outerwear

=== Credit unions ===
- Cascade Community Federal Credit Union
- Fi-linx
- First Tech Credit Union
- Oregon Community Credit Union
- Rogue Credit Union

=== Breweries ===
- BridgePort Brewing Company
- Burnside Brewing Company (2010–2019)
- Cascade Lakes Brewing Company
- Deschutes Brewery
- Fort George Brewery
- Full Sail Brewing Company
- Hair of the Dog Brewing Company
- Henry Weinhard's
- McMenamins
- Ninkasi Brewing Company
- Portland Brewing Company (1986–2021)
- Rogue Ales
- Widmer Brothers Brewery

=== Broadcasting ===
- Alpha Media
- KOBI
- Rose City Radio Corporation

=== Distilleries ===
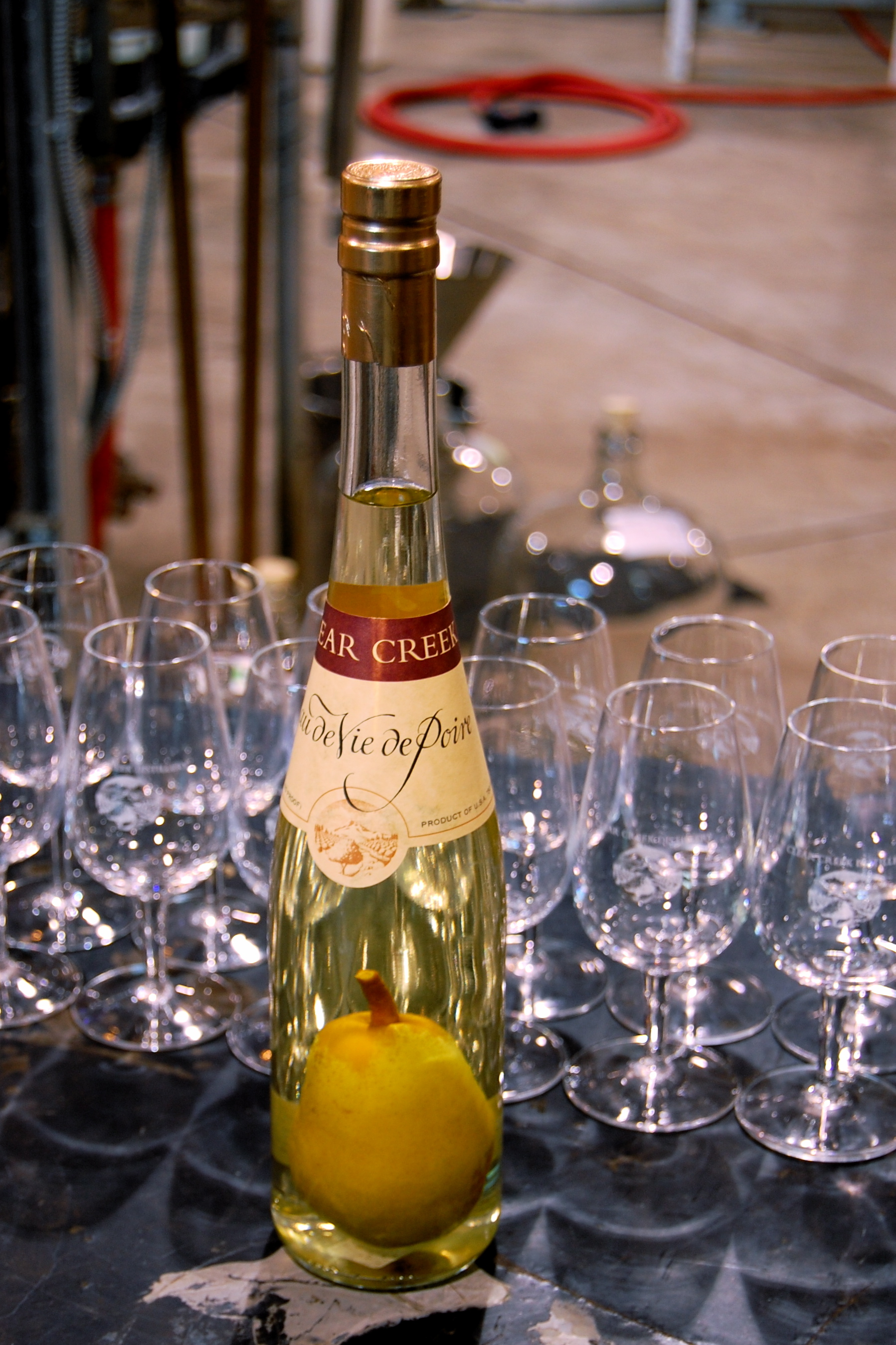
Clear Creek Distillery's "pear in a bottle" eau de vie

- Clear Creek Distillery
- Hood River Distillers
- House Spirits Distillery
- Rogue Ales

=== Financial and consulting ===
- Oregon Venture Fund

=== Food (manufacturing and related) ===
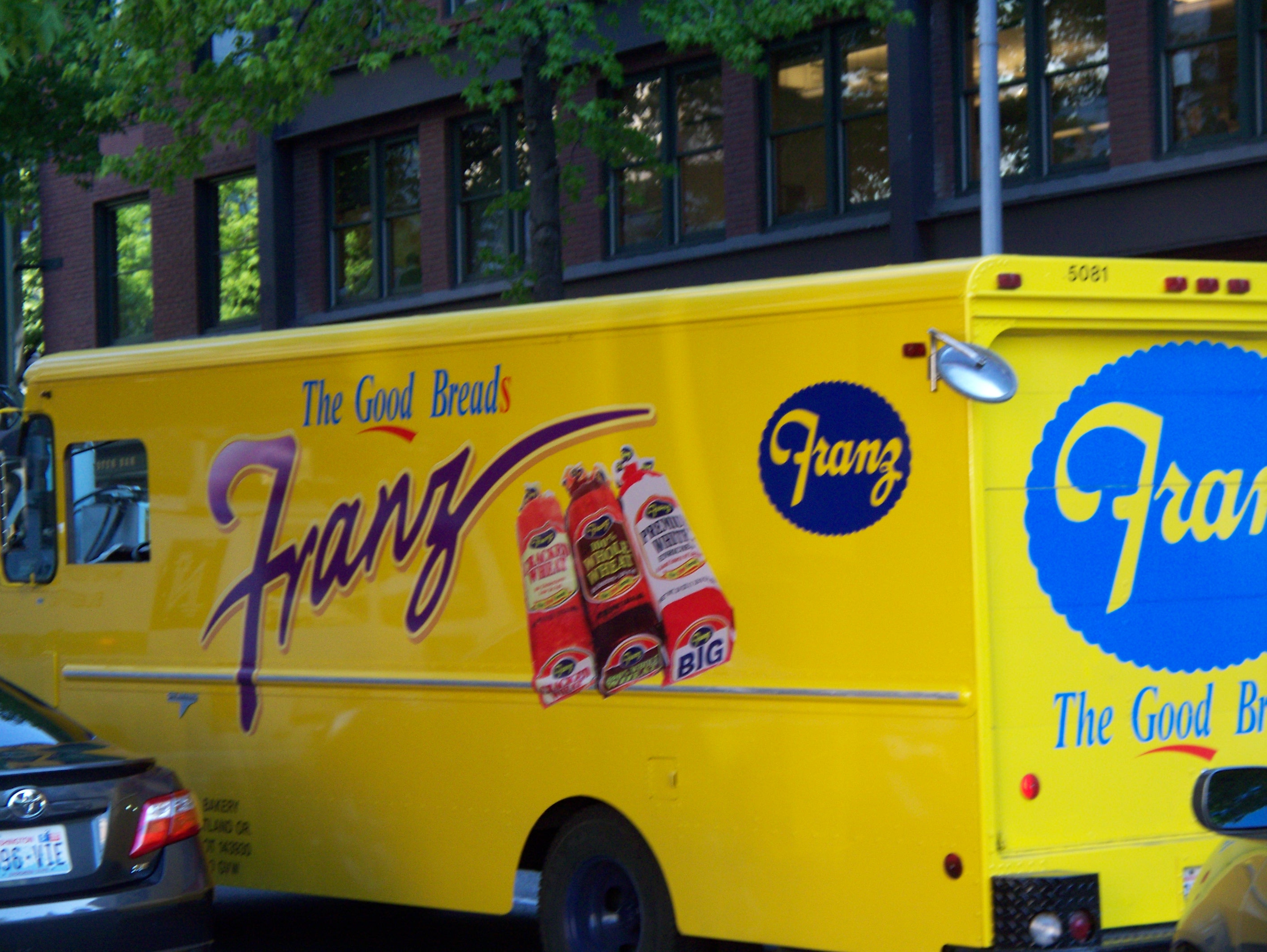
A Franz truck (in Seattle). United States Bakery is also known as "Franz Family Bakeries".

- Alpenrose Dairy
- Bittermens
- Bob's Red Mill
- Dave's Killer Bread
- Kenny & Zuke's Delicatessen
- Kettle Foods
- Market of Choice
- Otto's Sausage Kitchen
- Pacific Seafood
- Reser's Fine Foods
- Stash Tea Company
- Stumptown Coffee Roasters
- Tazo
- Tillamook County Creamery Association
- Turtle Island Foods
- United States Bakery
- Willamette Valley Fruit Company

=== Healthcare ===
- Cambia Health Solutions
- Legacy Health
- Mercy Flights
- Metro West Ambulance
- Tuality Healthcare

=== Insurance ===
- Oregon Mutual Insurance
- StanCorp Financial Group
- Standard Insurance Company
- State Accident Insurance Fund

=== Lodging ===
- Shilo Inns

=== Manufacturing companies ===
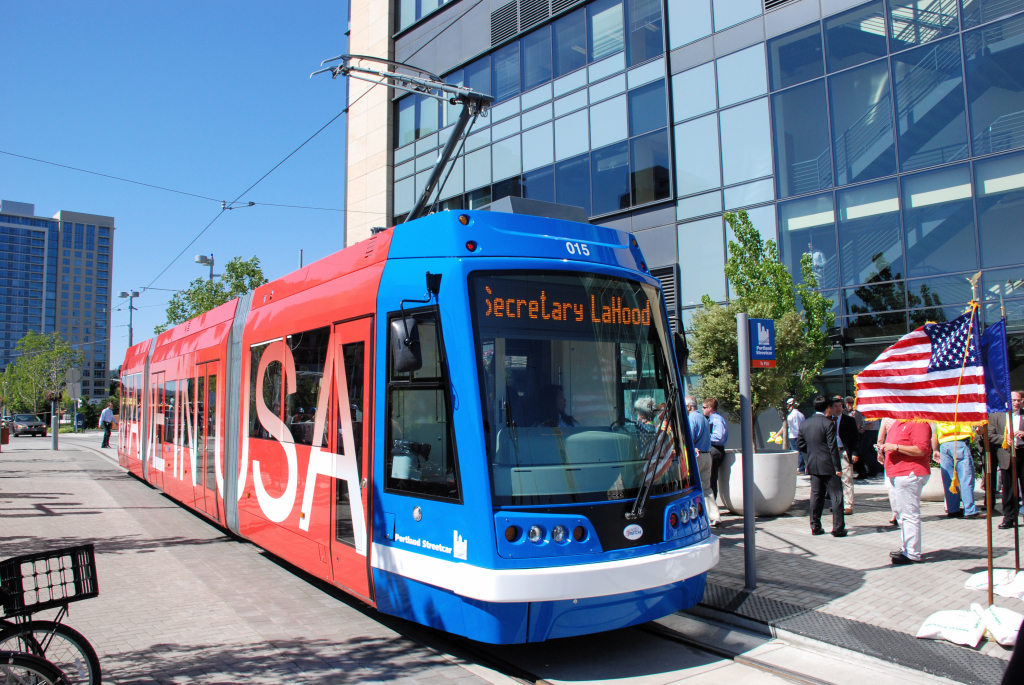
A prototype streetcar built by United Streetcar, at its unveiling in Portland in July 2009

- Benchmade
- Bullseye Glass
- Leatherman
- Miller Paint
- Oregon Iron Works
- Pendleton Woolen Mills
- Precision Castparts Corp.
- Radius Recycling

=== Publishers ===
==== Book publishers ====
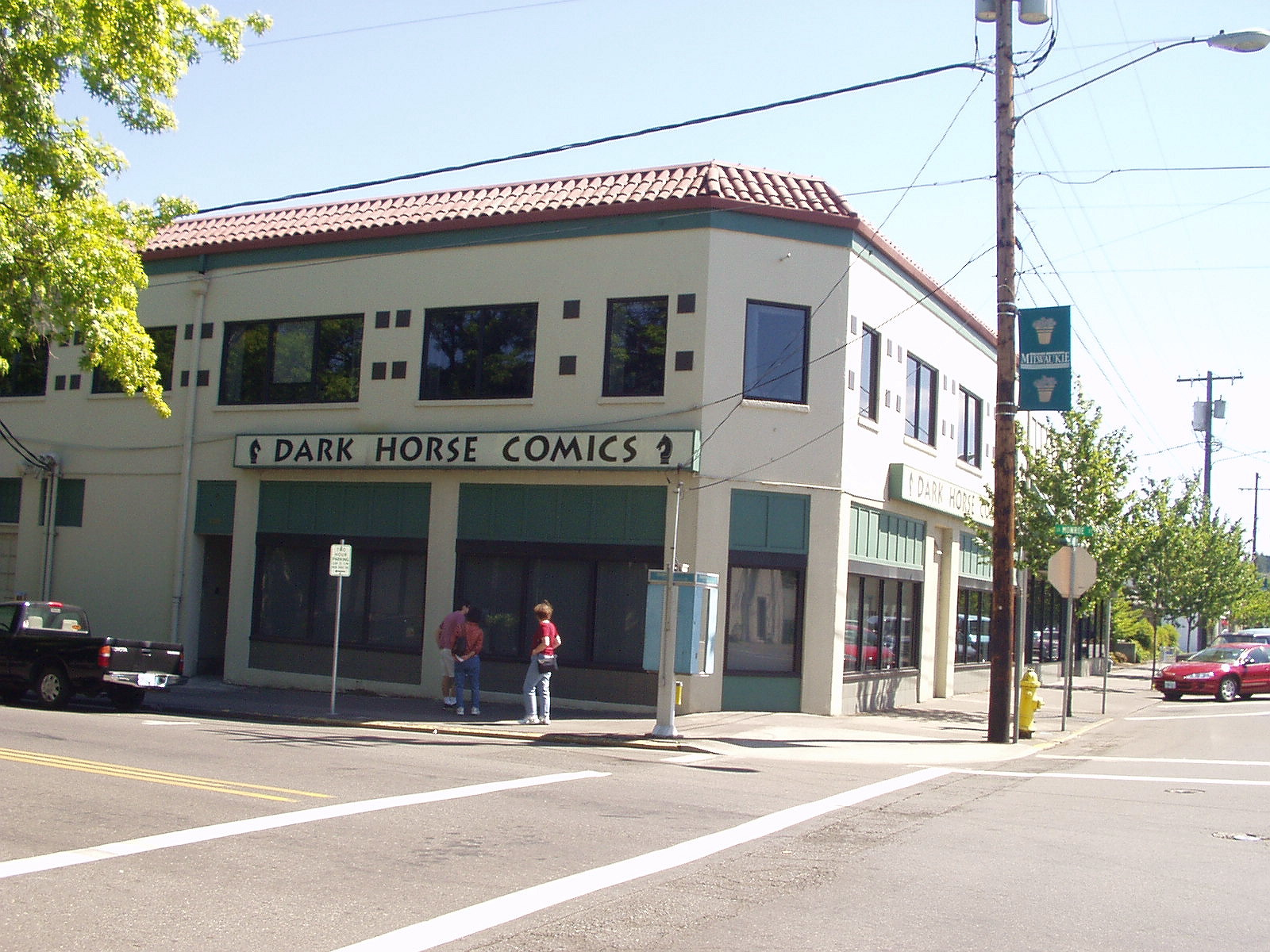
Dark Horse Comics headquarters in Milwaukie, Oregon

- Beyond Words Publishing
- Binford & Mort
- CALYX
- CNS Productions
- Dark Horse Comics
- DH Press
- Harvest House
- Hawthorne Books
- Microcosm Publishing
- Oni Press
- Oregon Catholic Press
- Oregon State University Press
- University of Oregon Press
- Wipf and Stock

==== News publishers ====
- OregonLive.com
- Pamplin Media Group
- The Register-Guard

=== Record labels ===
- Arena Rock Recording Company
- Audio Dregs
- Cavity Search Records
- Chainsaw Records
- Gnar Tapes
- Greyday Productions
- Heinz Records
- Hush Records
- Kill Rock Stars
- Marriage Records
- Projekt Records
- Rise Records
- Slender Means Society
- Soleilmoon Recordings
- Solid Rock Records
- Tombstone Records

=== Restaurants ===
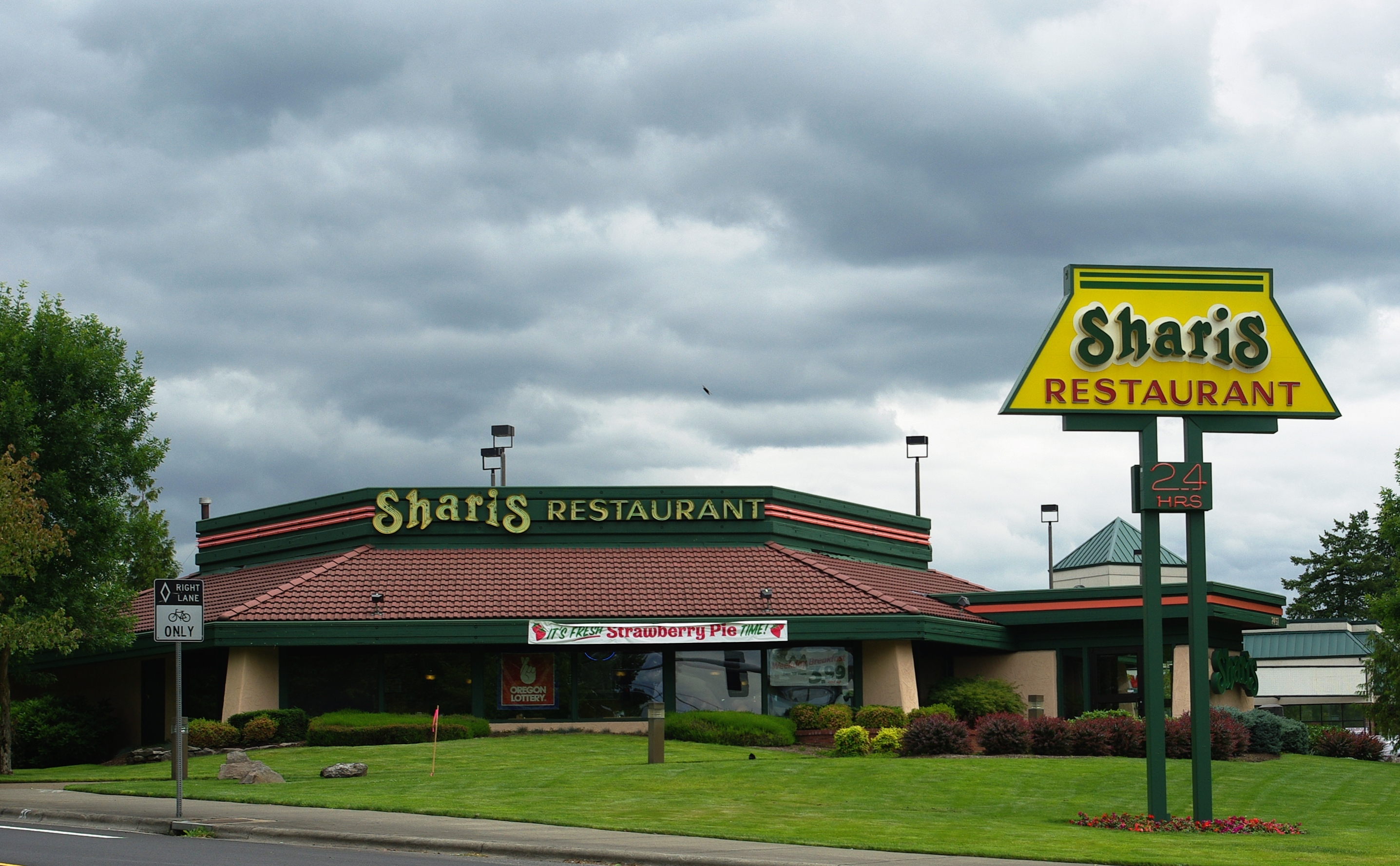
A Shari's restaurant in Garden Home, Oregon

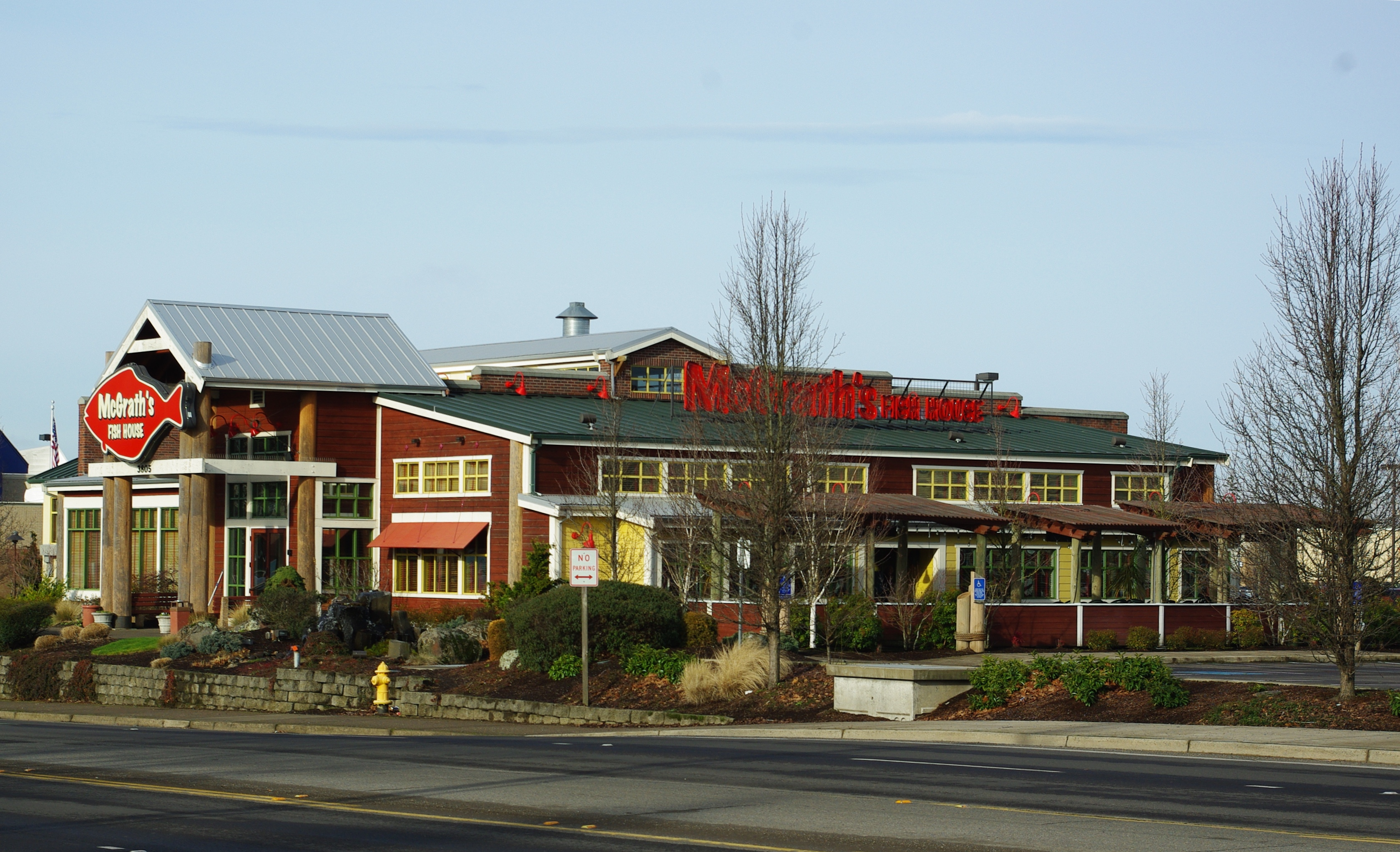
McGrath's Fish House in Salem, Oregon

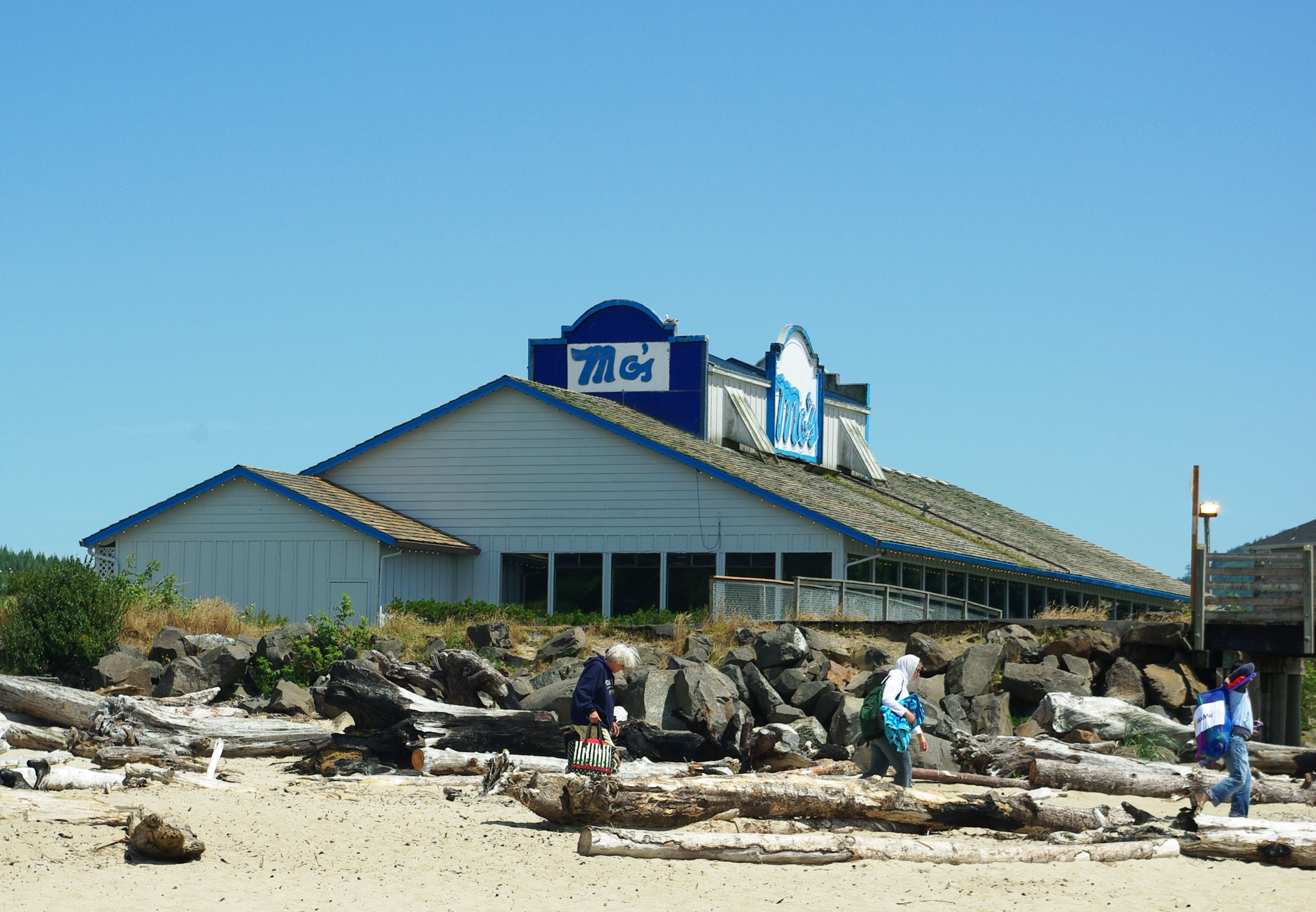
A Mo's Restaurant in Lincoln City, Oregon

- Boon Brick Store
- Bullwinkle's Restaurant
- Dan and Louis Oyster Bar
- Huber's
- Imbrie Farm
- Laurelhurst Market
- McCormick & Schmick's
- McGrath's Fish House
- McMenamins
- Mo's Restaurants
- The Old Spaghetti Factory
- Oregon Electric Station
- The Original Pancake House
- Pastini Pastaria
- Pietro's Pizza
- Pizza Schmizza
- Portland City Grill
- Sam Bond's Garage
- Shari's Cafe & Pies
- Sizzle Pie
- Venetian Theatre
- Voodoo Doughnut

=== Retail stores ===
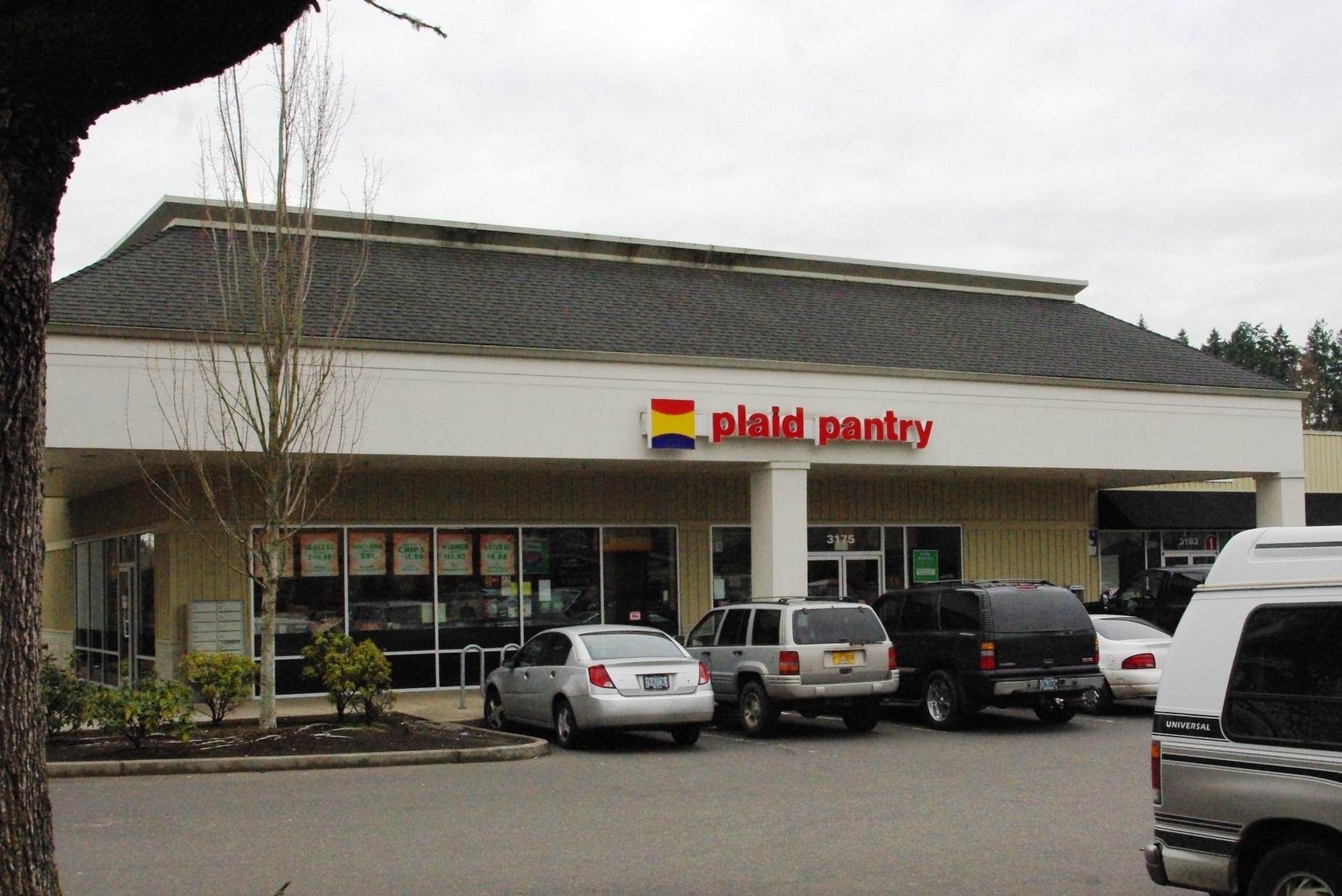
A Plaid Pantry store in Hillsboro, Oregon

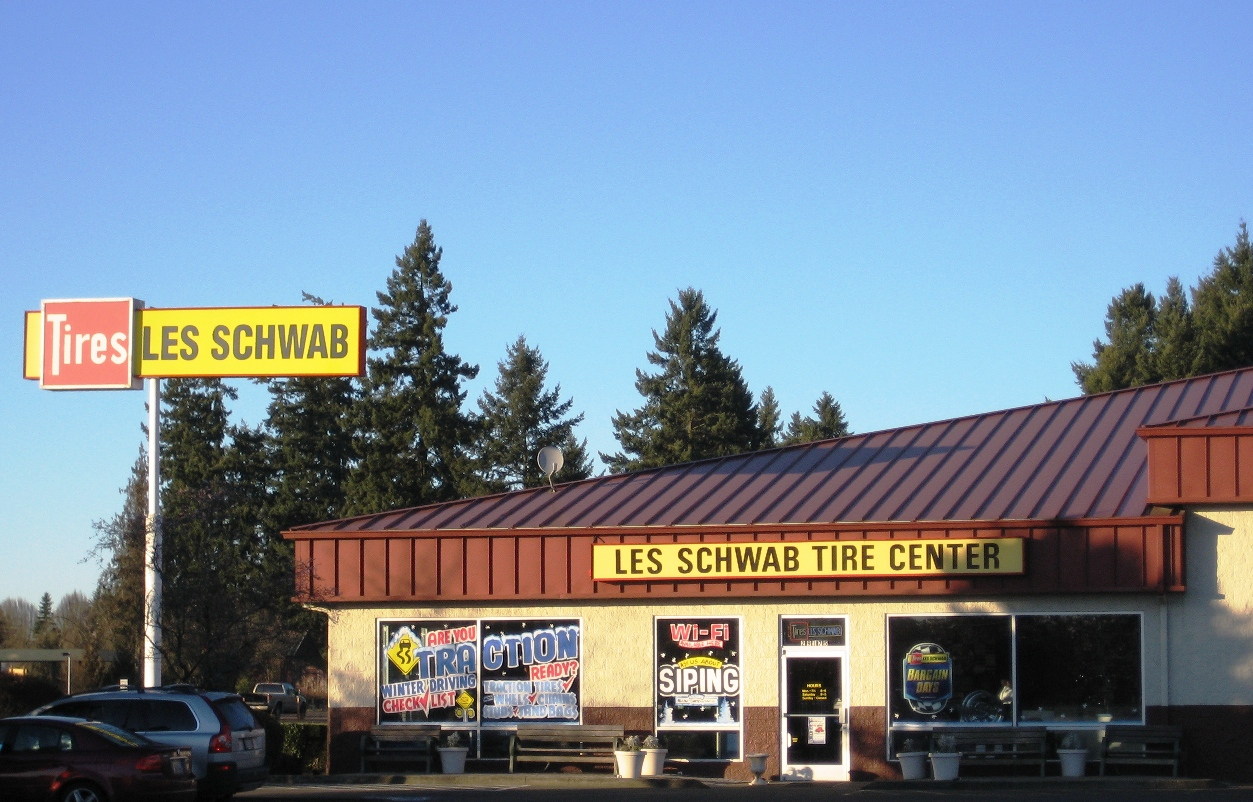
A Les Schwab Tire Centers store in Wilsonville, Oregon

- A-Boy Plumbing & Electrical Supply
- Alberta Cooperative Grocery
- Bi-Mart
- Dari Mart
- Fred Meyer
- Hanna Andersson
- Les Schwab Tire Centers
- Made in Oregon (a brand, not a company)
- Mattress Lot
- Music Millennium
- Nau
- New Seasons Market
- Next Adventure
- Oil Can Henry's
- Parr Lumber
- People's Food Co-op
- Plaid Pantry
- Powell's Books
- Smart Foodservice Warehouse Stores
- Wilco

=== Shipbuilders ===
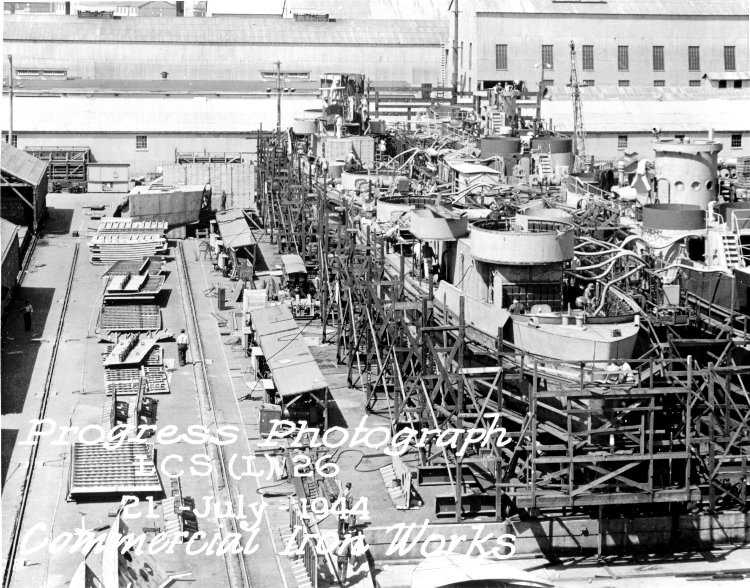
A Landing Craft Support ship under construction at Commercial Iron Works, 21 July 1944

- Sause Bros., Inc.
- Zidell Companies

=== Software companies ===
- Act-On
- AWS Elemental
- Brandlive
- CenterSpace Software
- Concentric Sky
- EllisLab
- Enli Health Intelligence
- Janrain
- Mentor Graphics
- Panic
- Puppet
- RFPIO
- TenAsys
- Tripwire
- Urban Airship

=== Utilities ===
- Bonneville Power Administration
- Eugene Water & Electric Board
- NW Natural
- PacifiCorp
- Portland General Electric

=== Wineries ===
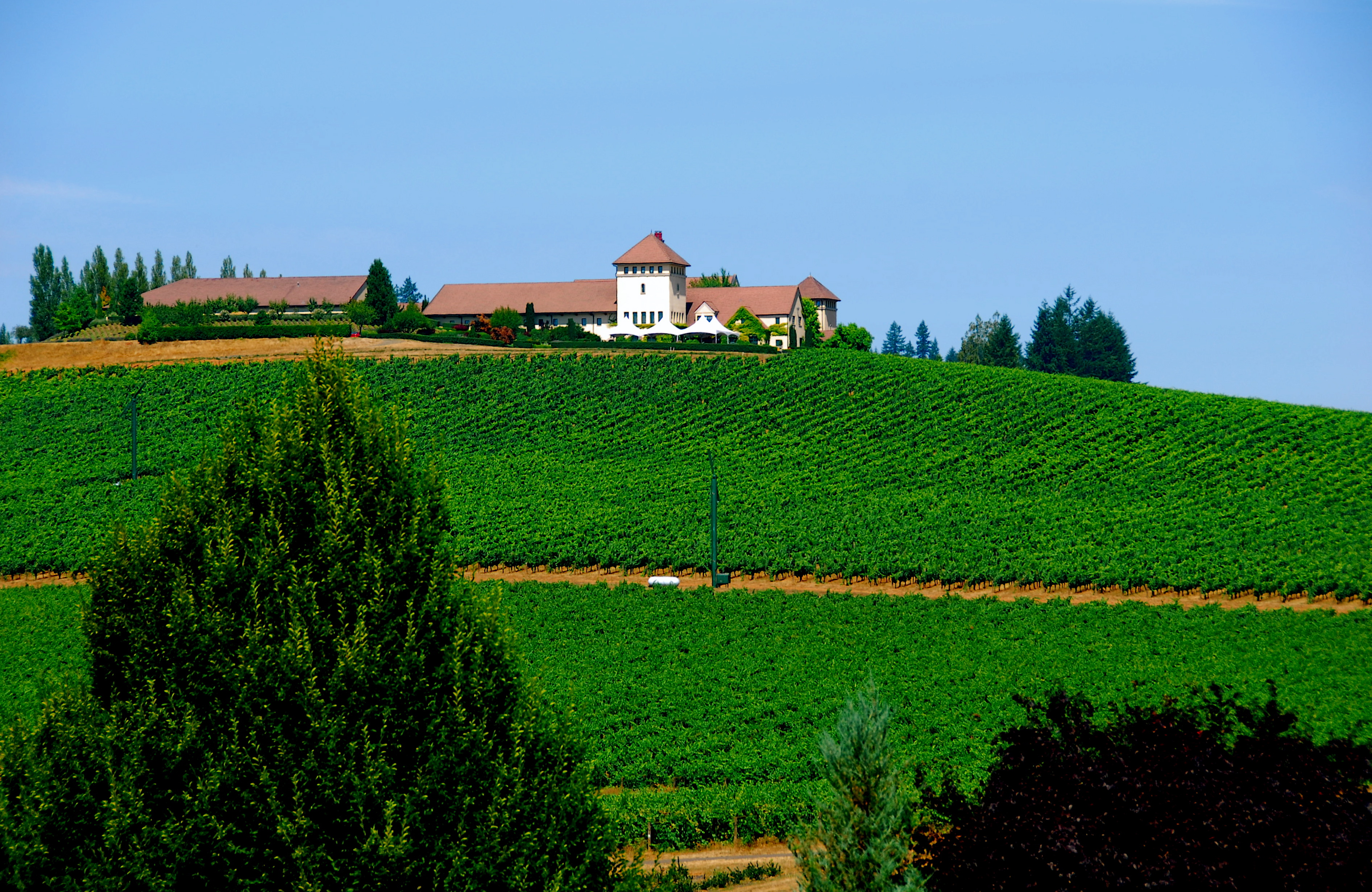
King Estate Winery and vineyards

- Bethel Heights Vineyard
- Bridgeview Vineyard and Winery
- Cooper Mountain Vineyards
- Cristom Vineyards
- The Eyrie Vineyards
- Foris Vineyards Winery
- HillCrest Vineyards
- King Estate Winery
- Maison Joseph Drouhin
- Sokol Blosser Winery
- Trisaetum Winery
- Valley View Winery
- Willamette Valley Vineyards

== Companies formerly based in Oregon ==
=== 0-9 ===
- 2 Player Productions

=== A ===
- Ace Hotel
- Alta Bicycle Share

=== B ===
- Bettery Inc.

=== C ===
- CH2M Hill
- ClearEdge Power

=== D ===
- Dagoba Chocolate
- Dirtnap Records
- Dutch Bros. Coffee

=== E ===
- Expensify

=== F ===
- Farrell's Ice Cream Parlour

=== K ===
- Kaiser Permanente
- Kimber Manufacturing

=== L ===
- Lancair

=== M ===
- Motorcycle Superstore

=== N ===
- Norm Thompson Outfitters

=== O ===
- Oregon Chai
- Oregon Steel Mills

=== P ===
- PeaceHealth

=== T ===
- Taco Time
- Tazo Tea

== Defunct companies that were based in Oregon ==
=== A ===
- Air Oregon
- Allalom Music
- Alternative Records
- Ambric

=== C ===
- Camera World
- Candy Ass Records
- Cascade Yachts
- Chambers Communications
- Clear Cut Press
- Columbia Aircraft
- Columbia River Shipbuilding Company
- Commercial Iron Works
- Consolidated Freightways

=== E ===
- Edge Wireless
- Emporium
- Enli Health Intelligence
- Evergreen International Airlines
- Evergreen International Aviation

=== F ===
- Frank Hrubetz & Company

=== G ===
- Galena Biopharma
- GameCrazy
- G.I. Joe's
- Graphic Arts Center Publishing

=== H ===
- Hollywood Video

=== I ===
- In Other Words Feminist Community Center
- Integra Telecom

=== J ===
- J. K. Gill Company

=== K ===
- Kaiser Shipyards

=== L ===
- Lipman's

=== M ===
- Malheur Bell
- MathStar
- Meier & Frank
- Merix Corporation
- Mount Emily Lumber Company

=== N ===
- NBG Radio Network
- Northwest Steel

=== O ===
- Oregon Iron Company
- Oregon Shipbuilding Corporation

=== P ===
- Pacific International Enterprises
- Pamplin Music
- Pulphouse Publishing

=== R ===
- Rodgers Stores

=== S ===
- Sawyer's
- SeaPort Airlines
- Sunn

=== T ===
- Talk Radio Network
- Tim/Kerr
- TriQuint Semiconductor

=== V ===
- VIP's

=== W ===
- Wah Chang Corporation
- WeoGeo
- West Coast Bancorp
- Willamette Iron and Steel Works

== See also ==
- Category:Defunct companies based in Oregon
- Category:Organizations based in Oregon
