= List of bioplastic producers =

This is a list of companies that produce bioplastics. It may be incomplete.

- BASF
- Braskem
- BioSphere Plastic
- Danimer Scientific
- DuPont
- Innovia Films
- NatureWorks
- Showa Denko
- Solvay
- Versalis (Eni)
