= Co-Motion Cycles =

American bicycle manufacturer

Co-Motion Cycles is an American bicycle manufacturer located in Eugene, Oregon. The company was formed in 1988. It is owned by Dwan Shepard and Dan Vrijmoet. The company makes high-end tandem and single bicycles. Co-Motion offers both custom frames and ready-made frames in standard dimensions. The frames in the company's current line-up are TIG-welded steel or aluminum. Their bikes cater to cyclo-cross racing, touring, road racing, and off-road touring.

== See also ==
- List of companies based in Oregon
