= Image3D =

- Industry: 3D reels and viewers
- Founded: 1997
- Headquarters: Beavercreek, Oregon, United States

Image3D manufactures and markets custom two-view stereoscopic reels and viewers for consumers and corporate customers.

Image3D's custom reels and viewers for consumers—called RetroViewer—have the same look and feel as View-Master toys but feature the customer's own personal photos. Consumers use Image3D custom reels and viewers as wedding invitations and table gifts, photo albums, birthday gifts, party invitations and other souvenirs.

Image3D's products for corporate customers—called Image3D Corporate—are used for marketing campaigns, communications initiatives, training programs, promotional and sales efforts and much more. Companies work with Image3D to design custom reels and viewers that feature their marketing photography, logos, and corporate branding. Image3D's corporate customers include hundreds of small, medium, and large businesses, including organizations such as Pfizer, Nike, Bacardi, Motorola, the Cartoon Network, Ford Motor Company, Pixar, GM, QVC, and others.

== History ==
Image3D was founded in 1997 by Rich Dubnow, the lead 3D photographer for View-Master, for over two decades. Dubnow's 3D photographs for View-Master have been viewed by tens of millions of people in the form of View-Master and Image3D 3D reels and viewers.

Image3D was founded in Lake Oswego, Oregon but is now based in Beavercreek, Oregon.

A wide range of media has profiled Image3D and its nostalgic products. Image3D was featured in the television series How It's Made in 2012. The program is seen on the Discovery Channel and Science Channel in the U.S. and U.K.

== Compatibility ==
Image3D has assured that their viewers are compatible with vintage View-Master reels/discs.

== See also ==
- List of companies based in Oregon
