= CollegeNET =

American web technology developer

CollegeNET, Inc.
- Formerly: Universal Algorithms, Inc.
- Company type: Private
- Founded: 1977; 49 years ago
- Founder: Jim Wolfston
- Headquarters: Portland, Oregon, U.S.
- Website: collegenet.com

CollegeNET, Inc. is an American developer of web technologies used for higher education. The company is based in Portland, Oregon.

== History ==
The company was founded by Jim Wolfston in 1977 as Universal Algorithms, Inc. The company introduced an automated classroom scheduling program for higher education in 1979.

Universal Algorithms launched CollegeNET in 1995, a website allowing students to search for and apply to colleges online. In 1996, Fran Gardner of The Oregonian described the website as Universal Algorithms's "most visible service". By 1997, CollegeNET received 3 million hits per month according to CNET.

Universal Algorithms changed its name to CollegeNET in May 1999.

In 2014, CollegeNET filed an antitrust lawsuit against college application platform Common Application. The two companies reached an undisclosed settlement agreement in 2019.

In March 2025, CollegeNET was acquired by investment firm Rubicon Technology Partners. In November 2025, CollegeNET's founder sued the investment company, "alleging the private equity firm misled him before the sale and then fired him less than six months later when he objected to the way the new owner ran the company".

== Universities using CollegeNET ==
Stanford University, Yale University, University of Michigan, Elon University, University of Pennsylvania, University of California, Berkeley, University of Washington, Oregon State University, and approximately 1,000 other colleges and universities use CollegeNET's services.

== Social Mobility Index ==
CollegeNET produces the Social Mobility Index (SMI) which measures the degree to which individual colleges and universities contribute to social mobility. As of 2021, the SMI "ranks nearly 1,400 four-year institutions on the degree to which they contribute to social mobility based on five variables: tuition, economic background, graduation rate, early career salary, and endowment".

== See also ==
- List of companies based in Oregon
