= PacStar =

Manufacturer of comms equipment

- Type: Subsidiary
- Industry: Networking equipment
- Founded: 2000
- Headquarters: Portland, Oregon, United States
- Key people: Peggy Miller, Senior General Manager; Jeff Sinclair, VP Sales
- Products: Ruggedized COTS-based networking hardware and network management software
- Number of employees: 130
- Website: www.pacstar.com

PacStar (Pacific Star Communications, Inc.), part of Curtiss-Wright Corporation's Defense Solutions Division, is a developer and manufacturer of tactical communication and information technology infrastructure hardware and software based in Portland, Oregon. The company was founded in 2000 in Oregon as a reseller of advanced networking and communication equipment and in 2005 began manufacturing communications systems of its own design. The company has multi-million dollar deals with several branches of the US military and also supplies rugged networking equipment to commercial industries. The formerly privately held company was acquired by Curtiss-Wright in late 2020.

== History ==
PacStar started out reselling IT communications equipment to various branches of the U.S. military and focused on establishing customer and vendor relationships. The company first accepted outside funding in 2005 and completed another round in 2007 bringing total external investment at the time to $18.2 million. The company worked with Cisco to develop ruggedized systems to meet military specifications and for use by emergency response organizations.

In the ensuing years, the company developed a range of lightweight ruggedized systems based on certified and accredited commercial-off-the-shelf (COTS) components and IQ-Core Software that simplifies common network management tasks. In July, 2010, Bob Dunn was named CEO and elected to the Board of Directors.

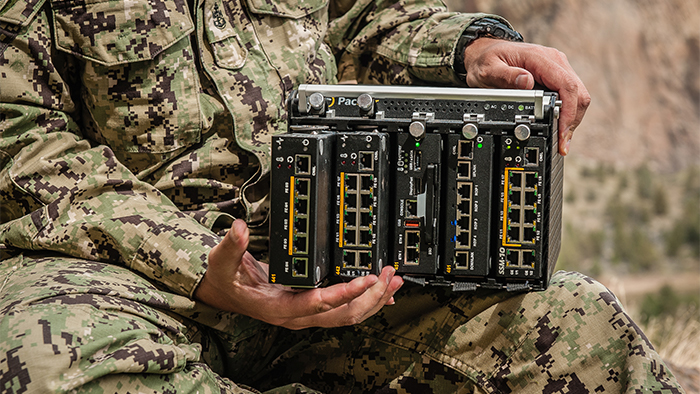
400-Series Ruggedized Module

In 2011, PacStar won a contract valued at $12.2 million to deliver 225 of its tactical communication units to US forces in Afghanistan. At the time, it was the largest contract in the company’s history.

In 2012, PacStar was awarded the TacSat Nano contract by the 6th Contracting Squadron, MacDill Air Force Base, Florida. TacSat Nano is a lightweight, compact, and flexible package for multiband voice, ViaSat messaging services, and Radio-over-Internet protocol in a single case.

In 2013, PacStar won a $9 million contract under the WIN-T Increment 1 program to supply the US Army with PacStar IQ-Core Software. The company also won an $8.4 million Expeditionary Command and Control Suite program of record contract to provide multi-network PacStar 4100 kits to the US Marine Corps System Command. After four years leading PacStar as CEO, Mr. Dunn resigned from PacStar.

IQ-Core Software with CSfC

In October 2016 PacStar completed delivery of 6,000 licenses of PacStar IQ-Core Software to the US Army for the WIN-T Increment 1 program. The network management software is reported to reduce system management complexity.

In 2016, the company tripled the size of its manufacturing facilities and was named “2016 Manufacturer of the Year” by the Portland Business Journal for companies with 51-100 employees. It expected $100 million in orders in the next five years. The company also formed a partnership with Oceaneering, Inc. to help oil and gas companies deliver data from offshore to onshore monitoring facilities.

In September 2017, PacStar won a $10 million contract to provide rugged communications system to the US Marine Corps for its Networking-On-The-Move (NOTM) program. PacStar 400-Series equipment will be installed into tactical ground vehicles and can be dismounted and used in command posts without the use of tools.

In January 2018, the U.S. Army announced it would move forward with full rate production on communications modules from PacStar under the Transportable Tactical Command Communications (T2C2) program. In February 2018, the company introduced the PacStar Tactical Fidelis Cybersecurity System to protect in-theater, executive vehicle-mounted and forward operating base communications. Also in February, CEO Peggy Miller was named a winner of the Portland Business Journal’s 2018 Women of Influence award. In May 2018, the Technology Association of Oregon named PacStar Company of the Year for growth. In June 2018, PacStar was named one of the fastest-growing companies in Oregon by the Portland Business Journal and named to the 2018 CRN Solution Provider 500 list. In October 2018, PacStar secured a $20 million-plus contract with the U.S. Army Security Forces Assistance Brigade and said it expects to double staff over the next few years. The company also introduced the PacStar Modular Data Center (MDC) that enables deployment of data-center class computing at the edge of tactical networks.

In March 2019, PacStar won a deal worth up to $48 million with the US Marine Corps System Command and in June announced that it had won a major deal to supply equipment to the US Army Project Manager Tactical Network program. The two deals for wireless command post networking equipment are worth up to $300 million combined over five to seven years. In June 2019, PacStar was again named to the Portland Business Journal's list of the fastest growing private 100 companies in Oregon and southwest Washington. In September 2019, PacStar's secure wireless command post received a Government Innovation Award from Washington Technology.

During 2019, PacStar CEO Peggy Miller won the Gold Stevie Award in the Executive of the Year – Business Products category in the 16th annual Stevie Awards for Women in Business and was also presented the Athena Award for her excellence in leadership. On November 5, 2019 PacStar was awarded US Patent Number 10,469,268 for its invention in management and setup of network encryption systems embodied in PacStar IQ-Core Crypto Manager using public key infrastructure. Also in November 2019, PacStar launched Enterprise CSfC Solutions (ECS), a suite of enterprise gateway services designed for classified networks using COTS products.

In February 2020, CEO Peggy Miller was named Executive of the Year 2020 by the Portland Business Journal and she also won the 2020 Sam Blackman Award (previously called Technology Executive of the Year Award) from the Technology Association of Oregon. Both award programs cited Miller’s leadership and long track record of driving operational and financial success at PacStar. In October 2020, Miller won the EY Entrepreneur Of The Year Award in the Pacific Northwest region.

On Sept. 24, 2020, Curtiss-Wright Corporate announced intentions to acquire PacStar for $400 million in cash. The acquisition was completed on Nov. 2, 2020 and PacStar joined its parent organizations’ defense business segment.

== See also ==
- List of companies based in Oregon
