= Hedgebrook (company) =

Hedgebrook, Inc.
- Company type: Public
- Traded as: OTCQB: HBRK
- Industry: Holding Company
- Founded: 2004
- Headquarters: Ashland, Oregon, U.S.
- Key people: Brady Brim-DeForest (Chairman); William C. Patridge (President & CEO)
- Products: Diversified investments
- Website: Hedgebrook, Inc.

Hedgebrook is an American publicly traded company listed on the OTC Bulletin Board and headquartered in Ashland, Oregon that focuses on mergers and acquisitions in various industries, including aerospace, consumer, energy and health care. The company was founded in 2004, and is chaired by Brady Brim-DeForest.

== See also ==
- List of companies based in Oregon
