= Heitman Analytics =

- Type: Corporation
- Industry: Mortgage rate research
- Founded: 1985
- Founder: Sharon Heitman
- Headquarters: Eugene, Oregon, United States
- Number of employees: 6
- Divisions: Professional
- Website: www.heitmananalytics.com

Heitman Analytics is a mortgage loan data reporting and consulting firm based in Eugene, Oregon, USA. The company provides North American brokers, correspondent, wholesale and retail lenders with analytic services and up-to-date mortgage pricing and volume data, including pricing reports, mortgage volume analytics, risk-based pricing information, volume reports, market movement/trend reports, HELOC and home equity loan reports, lender-based loan fee reports, mystery shopping surveys, and construction-to-permanent analysis. Heitman Analytics also offers its clients an interactive website to create custom reports and analysis from its pricing and volume data.

Heitman Analytics receives daily interest rate data from a variety of mortgage lenders, which it uses to produce rate estimates based on what banks across North America are charging borrowers. The company then provides a nationwide survey of rates to banks, brokers and consumer-facing companies like TrueCredit, which provides potential borrowers with estimates of interest rates for which they might qualify.

== History ==
The Heitman Group, Inc. (HGI) was founded in 1985 by Sharon Heitman in Stockton, California. Heitman has been a guest speaker and industry panelist at Mortgage Bankers Association annual meetings. The company changed its name to Heitman Analytics in 2010.

== See also ==
- List of companies based in Oregon
