= Edge Wireless =

- Industry: Wireless Services
- Founded: 1999
- Defunct: 2008
- Fate: Acquired by AT&T
- Headquarters: Bend, Oregon
- Key people: Wayne M. Perry, CEO; Cal Cannon; Donnie Castleman

Edge Wireless LLC was a mobile phone provider founded in 1999 by Wayne Perry, Cal Cannon and Donnie Castleman, serving southern Oregon, northern California, southeastern Idaho and Jackson, Wyoming.

Edge Wireless's network, currently owned by AT&T, is a 1900 MHz (PCS) GSM network. The company partnered with AT&T Mobility so users of either service could roam onto the other's network.

The acquisition by AT&T was completed in April 2008.

== See also ==
- List of companies based in Oregon
