= Aspen Capital =

Merchant bank in Portland, Oregon

Aspen Capital Logo

Aspen Capital is a merchant bank in Portland, Oregon, USA. The private merchant bank specializes in loan acquisitions, real estate financing and investment, distressed securities and hospitality. Originally known as Aspen Capital Partners, the bank was once strictly focused on commercial real estate, but entered the residential property market in 2004 by offering loans to homeowners who were nearing foreclosure.

== Financial crisis ==
The bank received a large amount of publicity when housing prices dropped in 2007 and about 45 percent of its loans fell into foreclosure. Although the company had little say in the housing market at that time, it is now recognized again as primarily a commercial real estate investor. The state of Oregon started an investigation of the lender in 2010 over allegations of violation of consumer protection laws.

== See also ==
- List of companies based in Oregon
