= Axium (company) =

Software company

- Type: Private
- Industry: Software
- Founded: 1993
- Headquarters: Portland, Oregon, United States
- Area served: United States
- Products: Project accounting software
- Parent: Deltek, Inc.
- Website: axium.com

Axium (XTS Software) is a privately held software company founded in 1993 and based in Portland, Oregon, United States. Axium has created accounting, project management, and business development software for the architecture and engineering (A/E) industries. Axium was named one of the fastest-growing private companies by the Portland Business Journal in 2008, 2009, and 2010. Axium was rated as one of the top 100 companies to work for in the State of Oregon in 2009 and 2010 by Oregon Business magazine.

== History ==
In 1983, Alan Mills formed a joint venture with Timberline Software and developed the architecture & engineering specific product offering. On September 27, 1996, Timberline Software sold its Architecture & Engineering product line to Mills and Cathy Mills. In 2004, Axium launched an entirely new software platform, Ajera, which makes up its core offering today. The company announced plans to move to neighboring Tigard's Lincoln Center in 2010. The company had revenues of $10.9 million for 2011 and had 78 employees at that time. Axium was sold in December 2012 to 2ndWave Software, but was to retain its headquarters in Oregon.

Axium launched a new product, Project Trek, in 2014. This came after the company acquired ArchitTrek in March 2014 in an effort to add collaboration and construction project management to its offering.

=== Acquisition by Deltek ===
In June 2014, Axium was acquired by Deltek, Inc. The terms of the acquisition were not disclosed. While Deltek announced plans to incorporate Axium's software solutions into their own offering and reported that the acquisition would speed their growth, Axium continues to operate as a separate entity and serve their 3,500+ existing customers.

== See also ==
- List of companies based in Oregon
