= Bettery Inc. =

BETTERY Inc.
- Company type: Private
- Industry: Sustainable energy
- Founded: 2011
- Headquarters: Portland, Oregon, USA
- Key people: Shem Zakem, President
- Products: [reusable batteries and Swap Stations]

BETTERY Inc. was a privately held company based in Portland, Oregon, that provided a retail store-based reusable battery exchange service to consumers. BETTERY kiosks or "Swap Stations" allowed consumers to buy ready-to-use reusable AA or AAA batteries that can be used like a single-use battery. Once drained, the batteries can be swapped for a fully tested and charged replacement.

The company had placed five kiosks at Whole Foods Market locations in the Pacific Northwest and placed five additional kiosks at Whole Foods and Safeway stores in Seattle and Portland.

The BETTERY brand was sold in 2014 to Green Box Batteries of Tacoma, Washington. Green Box Batteries was since renamed WeCycle Battery Box.

== History ==
BETTERY was founded in 2011, to offer reusable AA or AAA batteries through their kiosks.

== Environmental impact ==
The BETTERY brand reduces the volume of batteries that are thrown away in the U.S. every year.

Each BETTERY reusable battery can be swapped and reused up to a thousand times before it is recycled back into the manufacturing stream. Consumers can use the BETTERY kiosk to drop off traditional single-use batteries, where they will be recycled. The contents of recycled batteries can be salvaged to make metal and other raw materials.

== See also ==
- List of companies based in Oregon
