= Portland Gear =

Company based in Portland, Oregon, U.S.

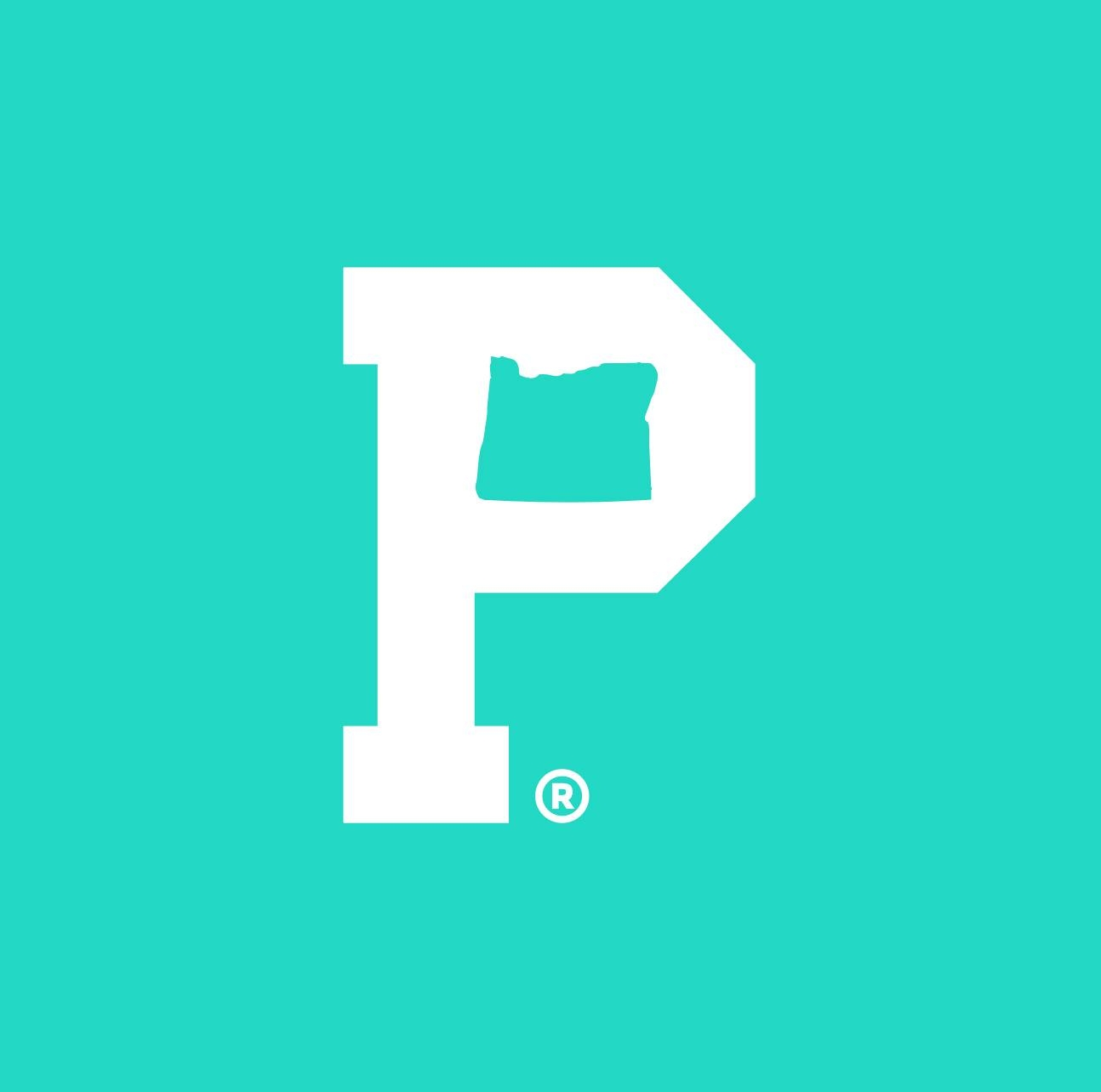
- Logo

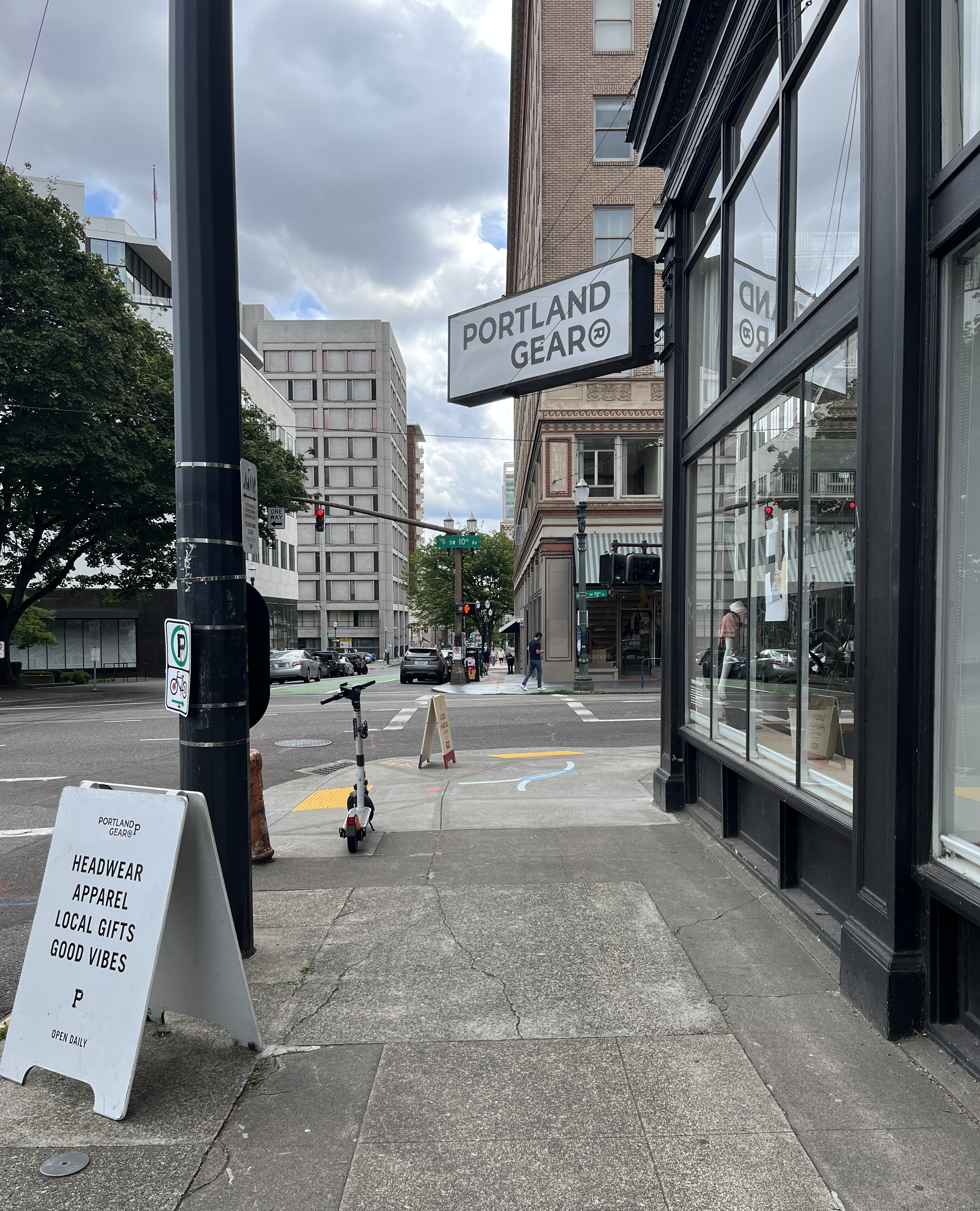
- Exterior of the shop in downtown Portland, Oregon, August 2025
- Founded: 2014; 12 years ago in Portland, Oregon, United States
- Founder: Marcus Harvey
- Headquarters: Portland, Oregon, U.S.
- Website: portlandgear.com

Portland Gear is a company based in Portland, Oregon, United States. The business uses a "P" logo.

== History ==
The business was founded by Marcus Harvey on Black Friday in 2014. He initially sold products from a 1973 Volkswagen Westfalia Camper. Portland Gear's first brick and mortar store operated on Southwest 19th Avenue, near Providence Park in downtown Portland, before relocating to Southwest 10th Avenue. The business has also operated as a pop-up at Washington Square, a shopping mall in Tigard. There is a Portland Gear kiosk at Portland International Airport.

Harvey's book Product of the People is about the company's first five years (2014 to 2019). Harvey was included in Portland Business Journal's "Forty Under 40" list for the success of Portland Gear.

In 2019, a designer accused Portland Gear of copying his work. The company's backpacks and bags are made in Vietnam. In 2021, the business announced a price increase on products because of supply chain issues. Another price increase was announced in 2025 as a result of tariffs. Portland Gear plans to open its first retail outlet outside the Portland metropolitan area in Bend's Old Mill District in 2026.

Portland Gear has had high school athletes represent the brand.

== Products ==
The business sells city-branded travel accessories, including water-resistant apparel and baggage. In 2020, during the COVID-19 pandemic, the business sold "We love you Portland" T-shirts to support health professionals. In 2026, Portland Gear gave away a limited number of T-shirts to Portland Trail Blazers fans.

== See also ==
- List of clothing companies in Portland, Oregon
