= Salomon Snowboards =

Snowboard manufacturer

- Company type: Subsidiary of Salomon Group
- Industry: Snowsports
- Founded: 1995
- Headquarters: Marketing: Portland, Oregon Design and Development: Annecy, France
- Products: Snowboards, Boots, Bindings
- Website: http://www.salomonsnowboards.com/

Salomon Snowboards is a category of Salomon Group. Marketing for Salomon Snowboards is based in Portland, Oregon, near Mount Hood, while design and development takes place at the base of the French Alps, in Annecy, France. Salomon Snowboards produces a full line of hardgoods for men, women and children including snowboards, bindings, and boots.

== History ==
Salomon released their first snowboard in 1997 after several years of development. The first board featured a simple single-color topsheet graphic and advanced technologies adopted from the resources of the ski experts. The company built a strong team of pro riders including Daniel Frank and Michelle Taggert.

In 2007, Salomon Snowboards hosted their first annual Backyard Bang rail jam in Portland, Oregon. The contest aimed to bring backyard snowboarding into the city. Salomon’s Backyard Bang has since expanded globally to include contests in Denver, Tahoe, and Germany.

In 2008, the Salomon SickStick snowboard won the Volvo SportsDesign Award for Eco Design in the boardsports category. The SickStick featured Salomon’s newly patented bamboo sandwich construction process, and was driven by the goal to improve the performance of Salomon products while significantly reducing the ecological cost of snowboard production.

In 2010, Salomon Snowboards won TransWorld Snowboarding’s Team Shoot Out, in which four of the best teams in snowboarding compete simultaneously at four separate resorts across the West for the grand prize – the cover of the September issue of TransWorld Snowboarding Magazine.

Salomon has a history of supporting innovative video projects in snowboarding including the Robot Food films, TransWorld Snowboarding’s film Get Real, Absinthe Films, Videograss, and Mack Dawg Productions.

== Team ==
2020	Team
Josh Dirksen	Desiree Melancon
Louif Paradis	Riley Nickerson
Victor Daviet	Nirvana Ortanez
Wolfgang Nyvelt	Harrison Gordon
Annie Boulanger	Tommy Gesme
Nils Mindnich	Jesse Paul
Hans Mindnich	Judd Henkes
Taka Nakai	Will Smith
Toni Kerkela	Maddie Mastro
Bode Merrill	Max Buri
Chris Grenier	Artemi Smolin
