= Willamette Valley Fruit Company =

Produce company in Oregon, United States

The Willamette Valley Fruit Company (WVFC) is a packaged and bulk produce company based in the Willamette Valley of Oregon, United States. The company is owned by the Oregon Potato Company and specializes in berries. WVFC packages several million pounds of fruit each year during the summers, contracting with growers from farms near the production facility.

== History ==
Willamette Valley Fruit Company, LLC began in 1999 processing local fruits and berries in the Salem area. The company was founded by three local farming families.

Operations began in the summer of 1999 with limited production capabilities for wet-pack products in pails and drums from fruit produced by a small number of growers in the area. By the second year, a production facility was built with a freeze-tunnel to broaden the range of products offered to include Individually Quick Frozen (IQF) fruit. This allowed fruit to be sold to a variety of end users from concentrators (for juices) to poly-baggers.

In 2000, WVFC purchased a local pie company called LaSuisse Specialty Foods, Inc., started by a neighbor. The pies were known through the local area for being high quality and handmade with natural ingredients and were being retailed in a Salem grocery chain, Roth's Fresh Markets. WVFC began pie production using the purchased recipes. In late spring of 2003, the pie production moved from roughly a 400-square-foot (37 m^{2}) space to a new building on the same property totaling over 4,000 square feet (370 m^{2}). The pies were then branded as Willamette Valley Fruit Pies.

In 2013, Willamette Valley Fruit Company was acquired by Inventure Foods, Inc. The Roth family maintained ownership of its farms and the Willamette Valley Pie company.

In 2017, Inventure Foods sold WVFC to the Oregon Potato Company as part of a $50 million deal.
