= SmartCAM =

Suite of CAD/CAM software applications

SmartCAM is a suite of Computer-Aided Manufacturing (CAM) and CAD/CAM software applications that uses toolpath modeling to assist CNC machinists in creating computer-numerically controlled (CNC) programs that direct CNC machine tools.

The SmartCAM family of applications include systems in support of CNC milling, turning, mill/turning, Wire EDM and fabrication.

One of the pioneers of "stand-alone" CAM systems available for the personal computer, SmartCAM was initially developed in 1984 by Point Control Company in Eugene, Oregon, and after a series of corporate acquisitions from 1994 to 2001, in 2003 ownership and development has been conducted by SmartCAMcnc in Springfield, Oregon.
