= BioSphere Plastic =

Manufacturer of biodegradable additives

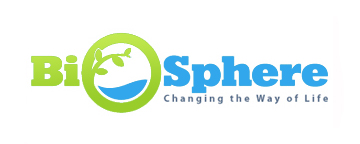
- Type: Private
- Headquarters: Portland, Oregon, USA
- Products: BioSphere Biodegradable Plastic Additive

BioSphere Plastic is a manufacturer of biodegradable additives. The company states that their product enhances the biodegradation of synthetic polymers by addition of their technology. It has a capacity at or around 5,800 metric tons a year and has filed for patent protection over their additive worldwide.

BioSphere Plastic released their test reports showing biodegradability of Polyethylene and Polypropylene for public review in July 2012.

BioSphere Plastic scientists have studied microbial biodegradation of polymers and have used this information to increase biodegradation of plastic made with their plastic additives.

== Offices ==
BioSphere Plastic offices are located in Portland, OR, USA, Santiago, Chile, and Bangkok, Thailand.

== See also ==
- List of companies based in Oregon
