= Tara Labs =

American cable manufacturing company

TARA Labs
- Company type: Private
- Industry: Cable manufacturers
- Founded: 1986; 39 years ago
- Founder: Matthew Bond & Merrill Bergs
- Headquarters: Medford, Oregon, USA
- Products: Interconnects, Speaker Cables, Subwoofer Cables
- Website: taralabs.com

TARA (The Absolute Reference Audio) Labs is a manufacturer of high-end audio cables from Medford, Oregon. It is currently led by president Merrill Bergs. Tara Labs is known for their use of solid wire.

== History ==
TARA Labs was established in 1984. As in the mid-1970s and early 1980s, TARA Labs had experimented with solid core conductors of different diameters. It was hypothesized that an 'optimum diameter' of 18 AWG (American Wire Gage) or 1 millimeter was ideal for audio frequencies because there was minimal high-frequency attenuation caused by the principles known as the Skin Effect. Founders Matthew Bond's & Merrill Berg's work was corroborated by research work from the NBS or National Bureau of Standards in the 1930s and confirmed later by Stereophile in July 1988, in a table presented as the DC to AC resistance ratio versus frequency in wires of different diameters. TARA Labs is credited with the invention of solid-core wires for audio use because his work predates Dennis Morecroft (1984) and any of the early solid-core wires developed for use in audio in England at the time.

Their first commercial speaker cables were designed in 1984, the Phase II speaker cable, which was a solid core design. Later, in 1990, TARA Labs introduced the world’s first cable to have a floating conductor unterminated at one end that would allow for an increased high-frequency bandwidth to be coupled to the signal-carrying conductors (US patent No. 5033091). Later, a control device inside a box fitted to the cable (The Temporal Continuum) allowed the user to adjust the amount of high-frequency energy to be heard.

TARA Labs introduced Rectangular Solid Core cables in 1992. These cables employed solid core conductors with a rectangular cross-section and can be made in specific proportions (width and height). This affects the tuning of the frequency response of a conductor as compared to around a conductor of the same size or DC resistance.

The cables employed solid core conductors with a rectangular cross-section. Both the Gen2 conductor and the smaller Gen3 conductor are said to be Eight-Nines™ pure copper, which is 99.999999% pure. TARA Labs’ trademarks for this technology are 8N™ and SA-OF8N® (Super Annealed – Oxygen-Free 8 Nines copper). According to Bond, the term ‘annealing’ refers to the method whereby a conductor can be made softer and more conductive.

In 1999 TARA Labs introduced the "Zero" interconnect with a Vacuum Dielectric Insulation system.

In 2014, TARA Labs introduced a new line of high-end cables called The Evolution Series.
