= Parr Lumber =

Lumber and building supplies dealer from Oregon

- Type: Private
- Industry: Building materials, retail
- Founded: 1930; 96 years ago
- Headquarters: Hillsboro, Oregon, U.S. 45.5607°N 122.909°W
- Number of locations: 44 stores
- Key people: CEO – Mike Howell
- Products: Building material, lumber, truss-way, cabinet, countertops, opti-frame, hardware, tools
- Revenue: $372.7 million (2007)
- Number of employees: 1,550
- Website: Parr Lumber

The Parr Company Inc. is an American lumber and building supplies dealer based in Oregon. The Hillsboro, Oregon, based company has 44 locations in Oregon and Washington and is the 18th-largest residential building supplies dealer in the United States.

== History ==
Parr Lumber started in 1930 when Dwight Parr purchased a lumberyard in Vancouver, Washington. By 1998, the company had grown to 13 stores with annual revenue of $243 million in sales. In 1999 Parr Lumber purchased six lumber yards from Copeland Lumber to bring the total number of stores to 19. The company started a special "Ladies Night" program in 2003 that focuses on helping female customers with home improvement training. Some of Parr's locations are represented by the Teamsters Union. In 2004, the company and the union fought a public relations campaign over the negotiations for a new contract.

By 2005 Parr had grown to 31 locations and annual revenues of $417 million. This made them the 19th-largest residential construction supplier in the country. In 2006, they were also among the 25 fastest-growing residential construction suppliers in the nation, and the company received an award from the University of Oregon's College of Education for their partnerships with schools. In 2007, Parr had grown to 38 locations with $372.7 million in sales while employing 740 people. This made them the 14th-largest professional sales dealer in the United States by revenue. In 2009, Parr closed its locations in Woodland, Washington, Madras, and Redmond during the home building downturn due to the housing bubble.

Jim Boyer was named as president of the company in April 2013, while CEO David Hamill was expected to retire at the end of 2013. The company acquired Country Homes Building Supply in Spokane, Washington, in November 2016.

== Operations ==
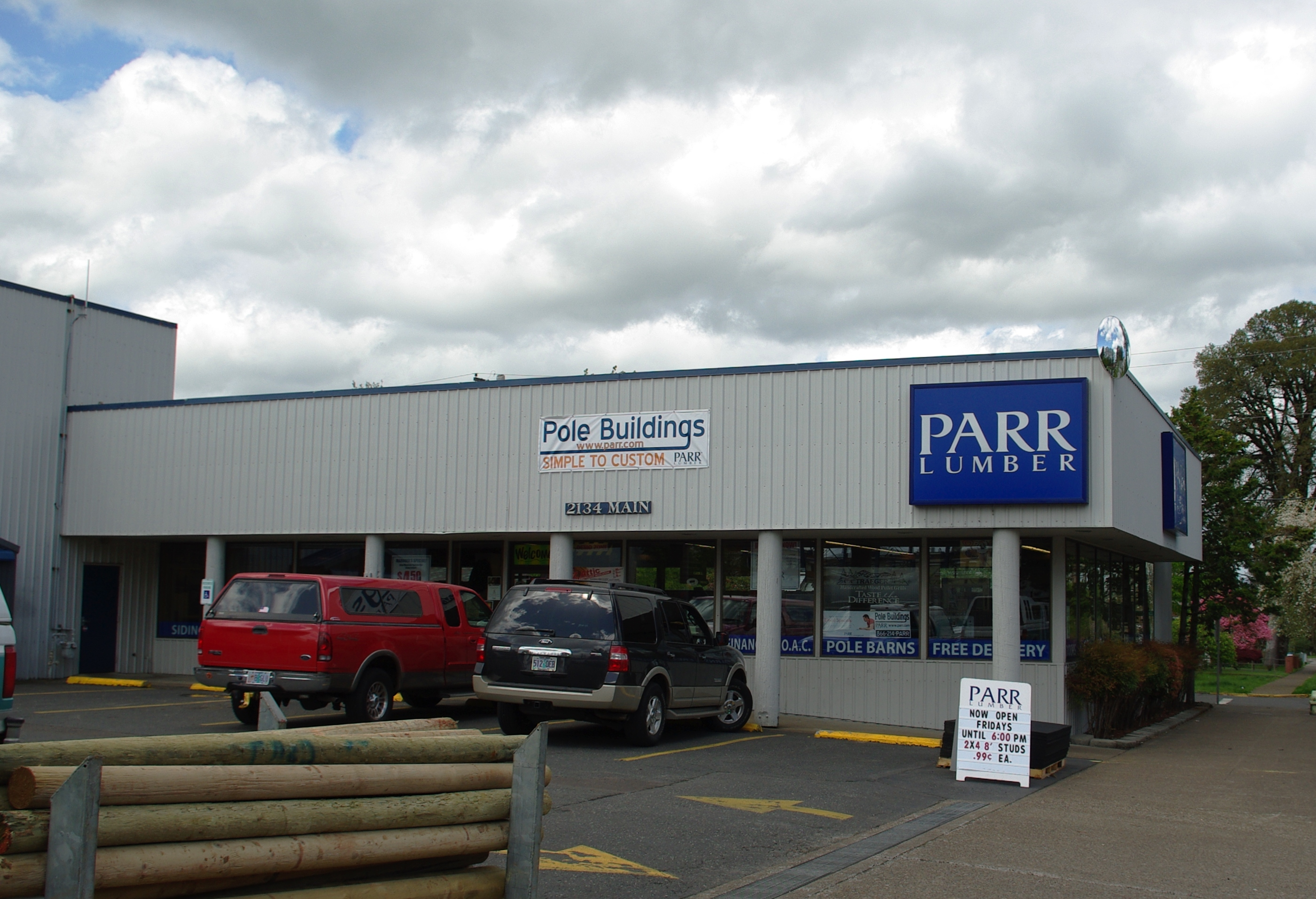
Store in Forest Grove, Oregon

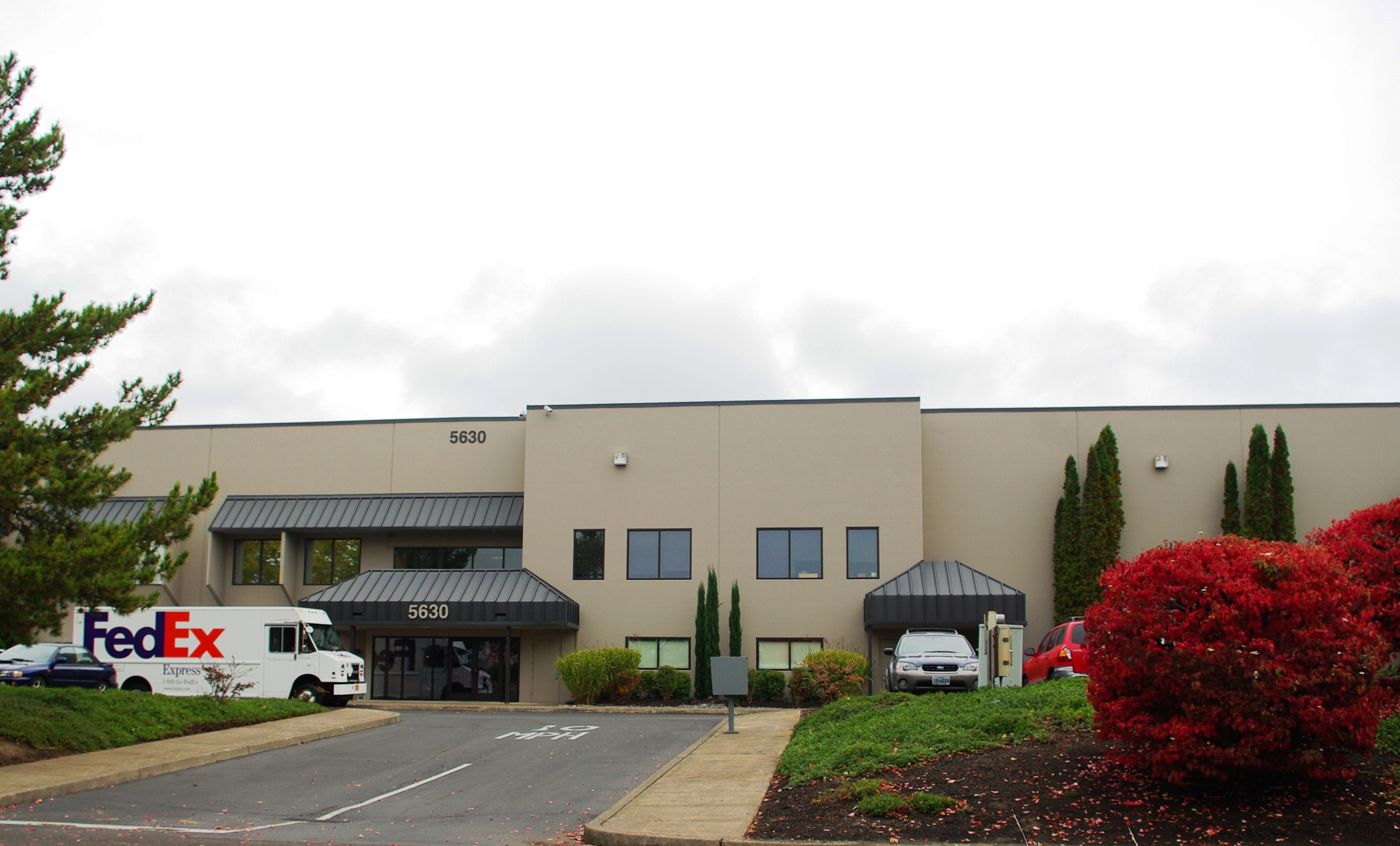
Headquarters in Hillsboro, Oregon

The privately owned building supplies company based in Hillsboro employs 1,400 people. Parr has operations in Oregon and Washington. The primary market segment for the company is contractors and homeowners.
