= Oregon Mutual Insurance =

- Company type: independent
- Industry: mutual insurance
- Founded: 1984
- Headquarters: McMinnville, Oregon
- Area served: United States
- Services: providing property and casualty coverages

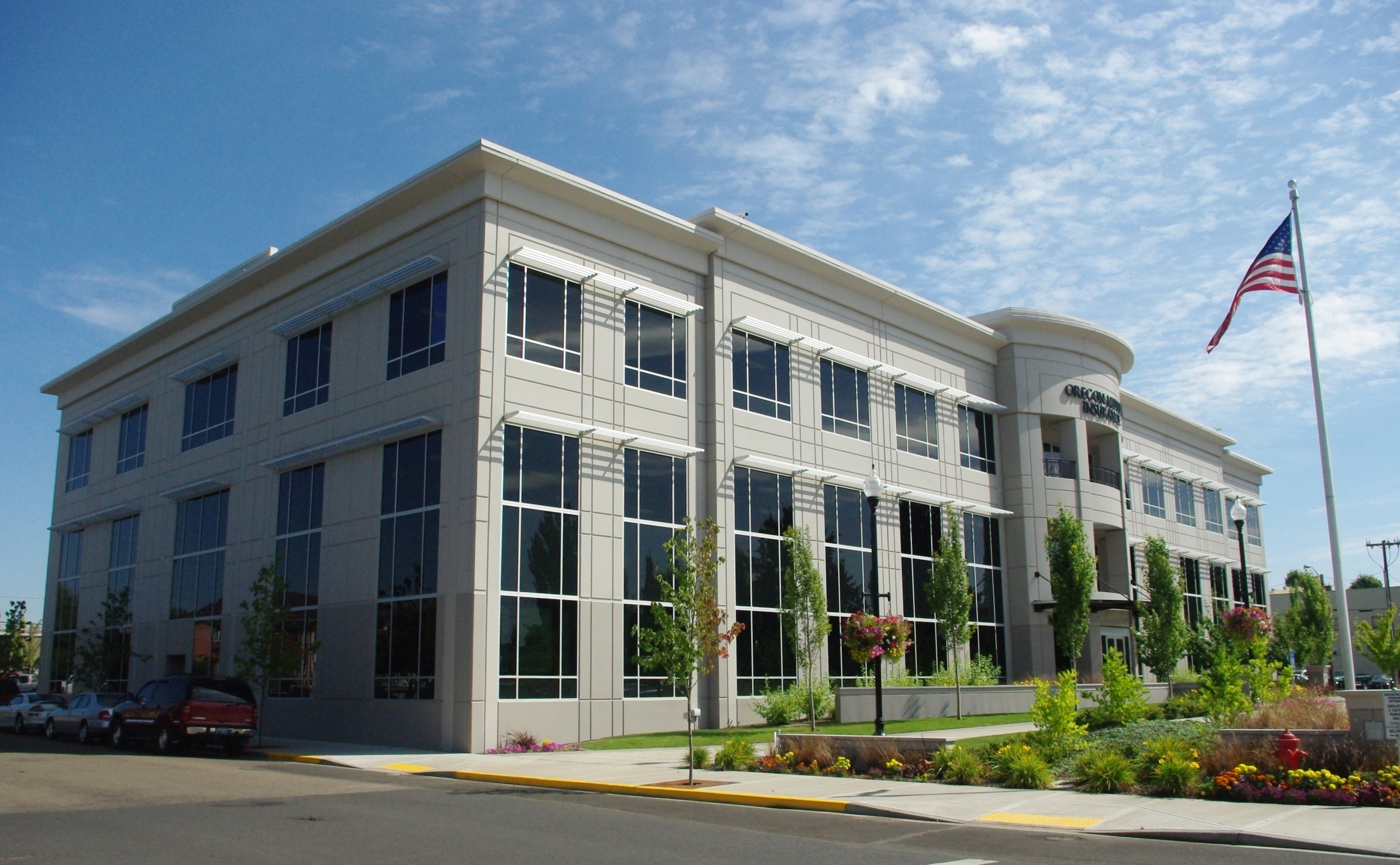
Oregon Mutual Insurance headquarters

Oregon Mutual Insurance is an independent mutual insurance company providing property and casualty coverages for individuals, families, and businesses in the U.S. states of Oregon, Idaho, California, and Washington. Founded in 1894, Oregon Mutual Insurance is located in McMinnville, Oregon.
