= Alberta Cooperative Grocery =

Food cooperative located in Portland, Oregon

- Type: Consumers' Cooperative
- Industry: grocery
- Founded: 1997
- Headquarters: Portland, Oregon, United States
- Products: organic food
- Members: ~1,000

The Alberta Cooperative Grocery is a food cooperative located in Portland, Oregon. Founded in 1997 as a food-buying club, the co-op opened its doors in 2001. It is owned by over 1000 member owners and is a member of the National Cooperative Grocers Association.
