= Oregon Community Credit Union =

Credit union based in Eugene, Oregon, United States

Coordinates: 44.159549°N 123.018036°W

OCCU
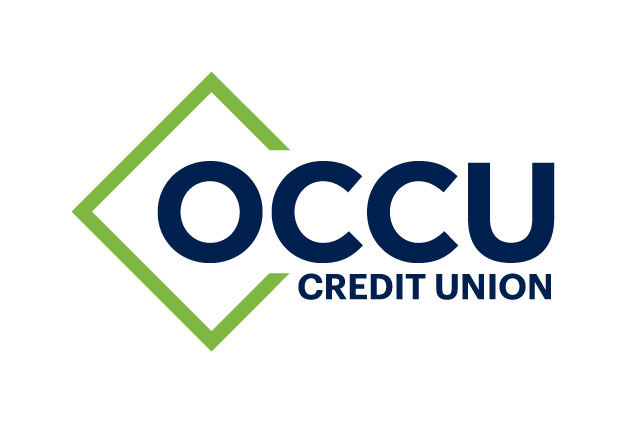
- Company type: Non-profit organization
- Industry: Banking
- Genre: Credit union
- Predecessor: Oregon Community Credit Union U-Lane-O Credit Union Lane Federal Credit Union
- Founded: June 25, 1956
- Headquarters: Eugene, Oregon, U.S.
- Number of locations: 14
- Area served: 28 Oregon counties and Washington
- Key people: Ron Neumann, CEO
- Services: Personal and business banking
- Net income: $27,288,844
- Total assets: $3,405,071,850
- Owner: Member-owned
- Website: myoccu.org

OCCU is a credit union based in Eugene, Oregon, owned by more than 260,000 members. It was founded as Lane Federal Credit Union, called U-Lane-O Credit Union from 1981 to 2003, then Oregon Community Credit Union up until 2016.

OCCU received approval to convert to a community charger and change its name to Oregon Community Credit Union from U-Lane-O, allowing anyone living or working within a 10-county area to become a member.

== Awards ==
- Portland Business Journal — Top 25 Corporate Philanthropy
- Portland Business Journal — Top 25 Most Admired Companies
- Oregon Business Magazine — Top 100 Best Companies to Work for in Oregon
- Eugene Register-Guard— Readers’ Choice finalist

== OCCU Foundation ==
Founded in 2018, the OCCU Foundation is the credit union's charitable arm. As of 2023, the foundation donated nearly $3 million in charitable gifts, including funding nearly $1 million in student scholarships.
