= Cascade Community Federal Credit Union =

Credit union in Roseburg, Oregon, US

- Company type: Credit union
- Industry: Financial services
- Founded: 1948 (Dougco Schools Federal Credit Union); 1958 (Western Cascade Federal Credit Union)
- Headquarters: Roseburg, Oregon; United States
- Products: Savings; checking; consumer loans; mortgages; credit cards; online banking
- Total assets: $340M USD
- Website: cascadecu.org

Cascade Community Federal Credit Union is a credit union in Roseburg, Oregon. On December 31, 2002, the credit union was established through the merger of Dougco Schools Federal Credit Union and Western Cascade Federal Credit Union.

== History ==
Dougco Schools opened in 1948 as a school employees credit union, and Western Cascade was established in 1958 to serve county, city and state employees. In 1978 Kay Bjornson became the CEO of Dougco Schools FCU, and continued as CEO of CCFCU until 2005. Gretchen Koester, previously the CEO of Western Cascade before the merger took over as the CEO until her retirement in early 2015. At that time Robert (Bob) Dempsey was appointed President/CEO. Dempsey died in February 2019 at which time Lynn Calvert was named interim CEO and finally permanent CEO in October 2019 after a cross country search was made.

== Security ==
In 2009, it was reported that the credit union upgraded from an analogue security system to an IP video surveillance system consisting of 34 cameras, some microphones, capturing in three megapixels color high-definition video at 15 frames per second. The security system comes from Brondby, Denmark.
