= OlsenDaines =

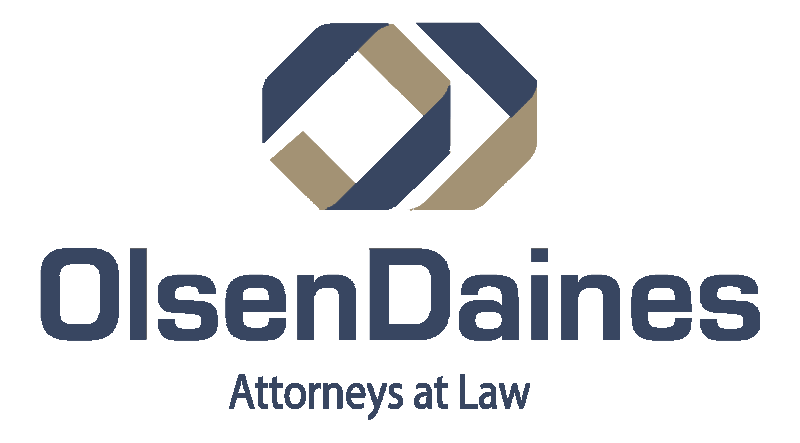
- Headquarters: Salem, Oregon
- No. of offices: 18
- No. of attorneys: 14+
- Major practice areas: Bankruptcy, Personal Injury
- Date founded: 1979 (Salem)
- Company type: LLP
- Website: www.olsendaines.com

OlsenDaines is an American mid-sized law firm based in the Pacific Northwest. It was founded in 1978 by Managing Partner Eric Olsen. While the bulk of its administrative staff work in the Salem, Oregon office, OlsenDaines has offices throughout Oregon and Washington. The firm specializes in bankruptcy, personal injury and social security disability law.

== Notable cases ==
On May 5, 2011, OlsenDaines Attorney, Keith Karnes testified before the Oregon Senate Judiciary Committee in favor of Oregon HB 2682, legislation that would bring Oregon's garnishment statute in line with the federal mandated exempt $217.50 after tax wages.

== Recognition ==
OlsenDaines was listed as number sixty in Oregon Business' 2010 Law Firms Powerlist. In November 2010, Keith Karnes was named a Rising Star by Super Lawyers. Karnes was also elected as the chair of the Oregon State Bar Consumer Law Section in October 2009.
