= McGrath's Fish House =

American seafood restaurant chain

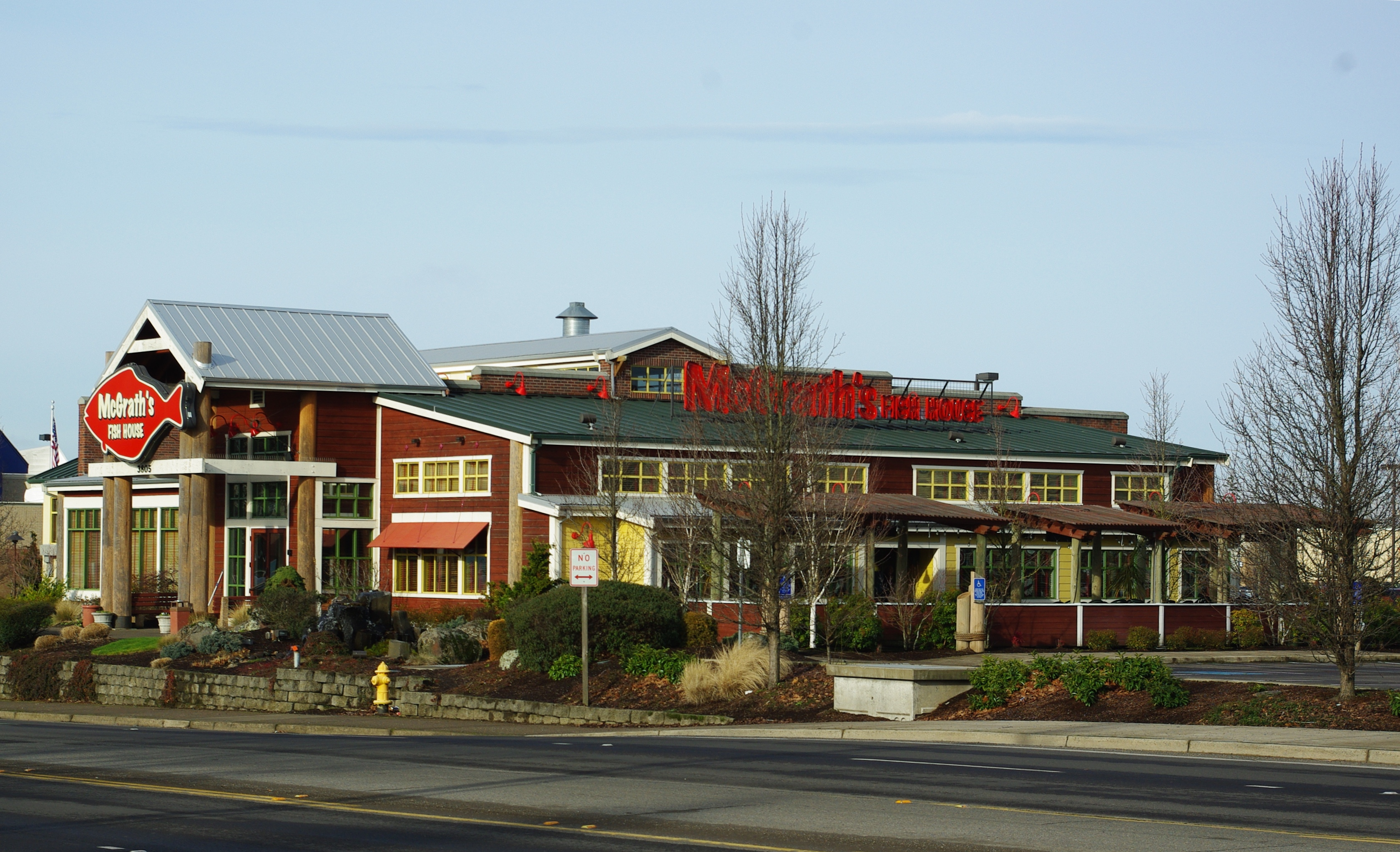
- Lancaster Mall location in Salem, Oregon.
- Founded: 1980
- Founder: John McGrath
- Headquarters: Salem, Oregon, United States
- Number of locations: 2 (2022)
- Area served: Oregon
- Website: mcgrathsfishhouse.com

McGrath's Fish House is a chain of seafood restaurants based in Salem, Oregon. The chain operates two locations in Oregon and Washington, but had as many as 21 in Washington, Arizona, Oregon, Idaho, and Utah.

== History ==
The first McGrath's Fish House was opened by John McGrath in Salem, Oregon, in 1980. That location in downtown Salem closed in 2015, with the company converting it into a restaurant called Urban Alley, which in turn closed in 2017. The company expanded to 21 locations at its most recent peak, including eight in Oregon, three in Washington, one in Idaho and four in Utah. The opened a location in Medford, Oregon, in 1996, which closed in 2022. The company opened a restaurant in Vancouver, Washington, in 1999.

In February 2010 the restaurant chain filed for bankruptcy under Chapter 11 reorganization, with both assets and liabilities between $10 million and $50 million. A month later, in a first step towards reorganization, it closed four restaurants, located in Orem and Salt Lake City, Utah, Phoenix, Arizona, and Lynnwood, Washington. Further closures came in 2018 with the Eugene, Oregon, location, in 2019 with the Corvallis, Oregon, restaurant and in 2020 with both the Boise, Idaho, and Bend, Oregon locations.

As of 2022, the chain operates a total of two restaurants in Salem, Oregon, and Vancouver, Washington.

== See also ==
- List of seafood restaurants
