= Mattress Lot =

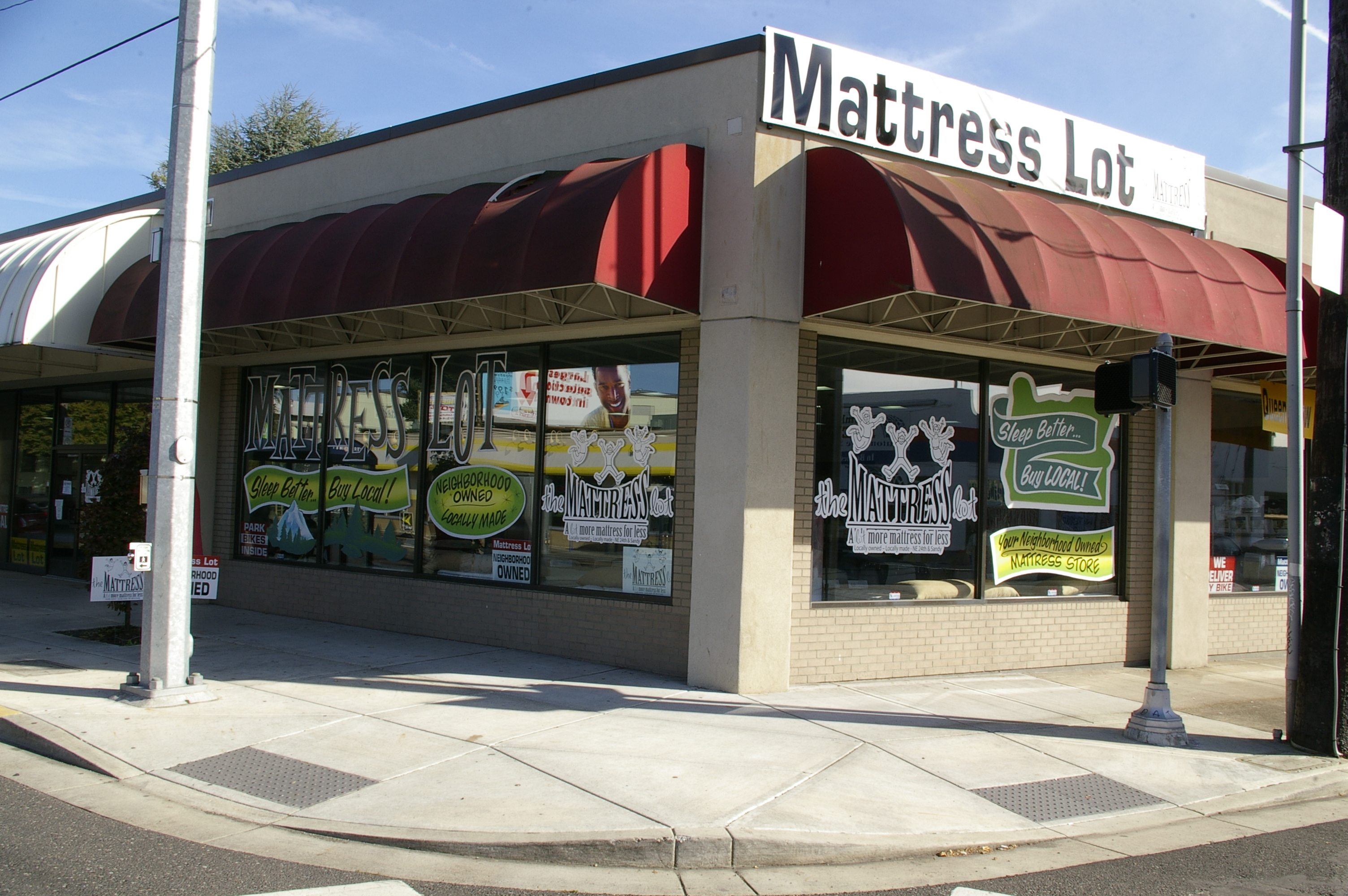
Mattress Lot viewed from 24th Avenue and Sandy Boulevard

Mattress Lot is a privately owned mattress and home furnishings retailer based in Portland, Oregon. The company was founded on January 2, 2010, by Michael and Mary Ruth Hanna.

== History ==
In May 2009, Michael Hanna was laid off from Comcast Cable. Subsequently, he and his wife, Mary Ruth Hanna, borrowed $8,000 to purchase a truckload of Sealy Factory 2nd mattresses. They leased space in a former car dealership and opened Mattress Lot on January 2, 2010. The business became profitable within the first six months. Michael Hanna later shared his experience at a TEDx conference held at Concordia University. In May 2011, Mattress Lot trademarked the logo and slogan "A Lot More Mattress for Less". In the same month, they were named 'Dealer of the Year' by Oregon Mattress Company.
