= Phoseon Technology =

American privately-owned electronic manufacturing company

- Type: Private
- Industry: Technology
- Founded: 2002; 24 years ago
- Headquarters: Hillsboro, Oregon, USA; 45°32′50″N 122°54′9″W
- Key people: Bill Cortelyou, CEO
- Website: www.phoseon.com

Phoseon Technology is a privately owned electronic manufacturing company based in Hillsboro in the U.S. state of Oregon. Founded in 2002, the company makes products that use ultraviolet light produced by light emitting diodes (LED) that are used for curing products in industrial settings. Phoseon is located in the Portland metropolitan area and has offices in Europe and Asia. Bill Cortelyou is the chief executive officer and president of the firm.

== History ==
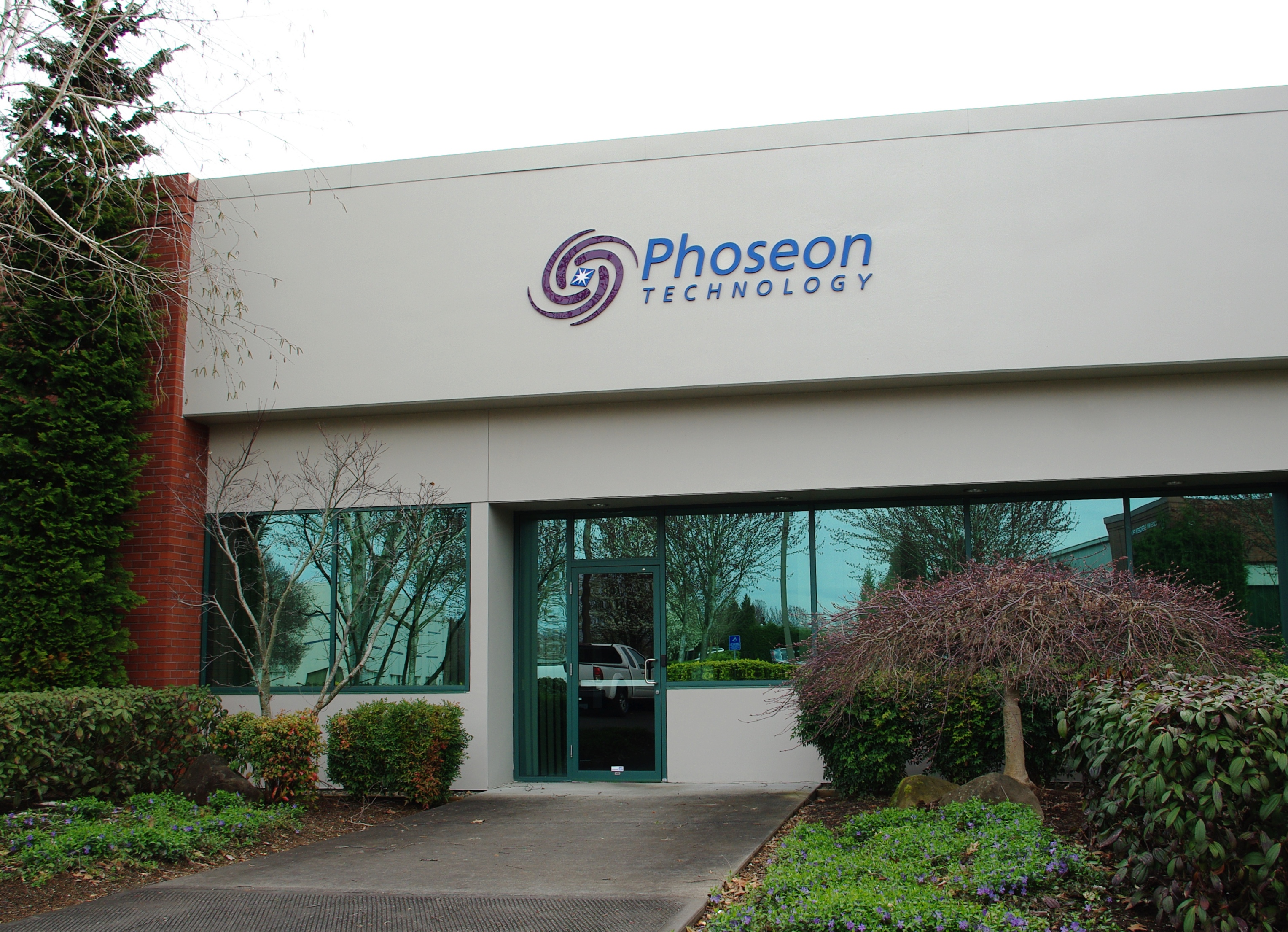
Company headquarters in Hillsboro, Oregon

Phoseon was founded by Mark Owen, Francois Vlach, and Christopher O'Leary in 2002 with a single product. Owen had helped develop the product while working for Agilent Technologies while Vlach negotiated the rights to it from the company after they declined to pursue the invention commercially. The product, the FX-B, is a fluorescent inspection system that utilizes a UV LED radion module as a light source. Phoseon had grown to 20 employees by October 2003 and expanded to offices in Asia and Europe.

The company raised US$6.4 million in capital in March 2005 by selling preferred stock to a group of investors that included SmartForest Ventures and PacRim Venture Partners. The next year Phoseon raised another $1.3 million through a convertible debt offering, upping their total to $9.2 million in capital raised. At that time the company had grown to 30 employees.

Co-founder Mark Owen left the company in 2007. He had been replaced as CEO in December 2006, but had remained on the company's board until 2012. In 2010, Phoseon was a finalist for Rising Star of the Year for the Oregon Technology Awards. Phoseon donated UV ink curing equipment to Clemson University in 2019. The company was purchased by Excelitas Technologies in 2023.

== Products ==
Phoseon has several products. Their main product uses ultraviolet light produced by light emitting diodes (LEDs) in industrial applications, specifically for curing adhesives, coatings, and ink. Phoseon calls their product Semiconductor Light Matrix (SLM), which does not use mercury and is a solid-state electronic technology. Their UV product can also be used in DVD manufacturing. The company's products are also used for disinfecting.

Past products have included Microelectromechanical systems (MEMS), and a product that utilizes infrared technology for inspecting semiconductors that was sold off in 2007 to Viscom AG. In March 2018, Phoseon Technology introduced UV LED microplate with KeyPro™ KP100 decontamination system.
