= Holden Outerwear =

American clothing company

- Company type: Private
- Industry: Fashion and Snowboarding
- Founded: 2002
- Founder: Mickey LeBlanc and Scott Zergel
- Headquarters: Venice Beach, California
- Products: Outerwear and Streetwear
- Website: www.holdenouterwear.com

Holden Outerwear is an American clothing manufacturer and brand that sells outerwear. The company is based Venice Beach, California, and was founded by snowboarder Mikey LeBlanc and creative director Scott Zergel. Holden Outerwear is currently owned by Patrick Nebiolo.

== Company ==
Holden was started in 2002 by LeBlanc and Scott Zergebel as part of Earth Products, a subsidiary of K2 Sports and the larger Jarden Corporation. In 2007, Holden severed ties with Earth Products and became an independent company. LeBlanc and Zergebel moved the company from southern California to Portland, Oregon. In 2007, Holden was distributed in 150 stores in North America and 15 countries.

In 2012, Holden moved its headquarters back to California. As of 2012, Holden is headquartered in Venice Beach, California.

In 2020 the company was re-launched by LeBlanc, Zergebel and the new owner, Patrick Nebiolo. It now also tailors to women's wear.
