= Santa Fe Railroad tugboats =

Tugboats used on San Francisco Bay

The Santa Fe Railroad tugboats were used by the Atchison, Topeka and Santa Fe Railway to barge rail cars across the San Francisco Bay for much of the 20th century, as there is no direct rail link to the San Francisco peninsula. In the post World War II period, a fleet of three tugs moved the barges: the Paul P. Hastings, the Edward J. Engel, and the John R. Hayden. After cross-bay float service had ended and the tugs had been sold, the Hastings sank off Point Arena, California in 1992, in water too deep to raise. The Engel sank off Alameda, California in 2007 and was raised and scrapped in the winter of 2013-14. The Hayden remains afloat and in service in Oregon.

== Background ==
The Santa Fe Railroad tracks only went as far west as Oakland, California. (The Southern Pacific Railroad had a line on the San Francisco Peninsula from San Jose, but blocked the Santa Fe from access.) Santa Fe did have some isolated tracks in the city of San Francisco. To connect to them from Oakland, Santa Fe used a fleet of tugs and barges to move freight across the San Francisco Bay. This service began in 1900 and continued until 1984.

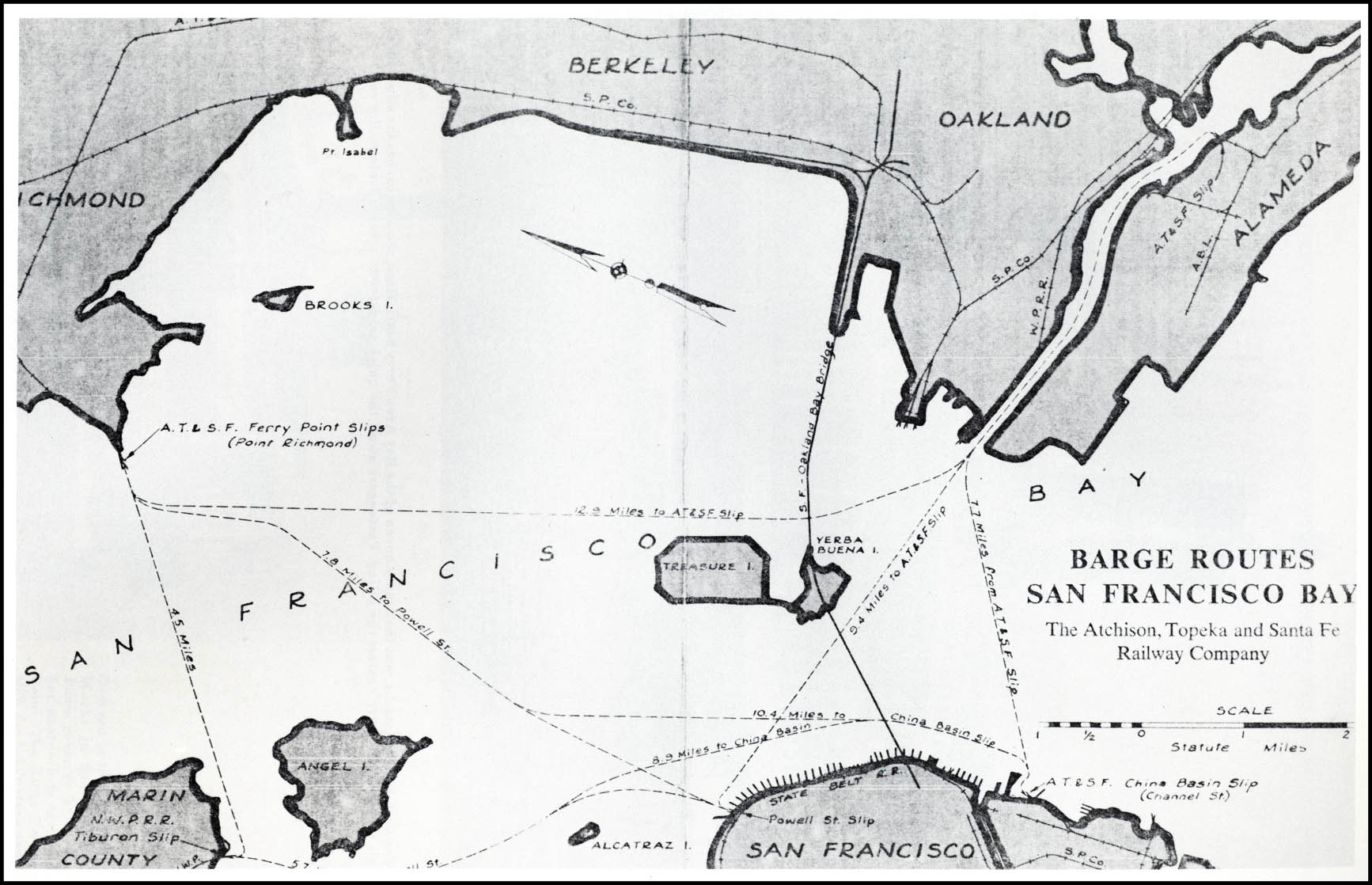
Barge routes in the San Francisco Bay used by the Atchison, Topeka and Santa Fe Railroad. There were many routes. From the Santa Fe Collection, now owned by the BNSF Railway.

Various cargo was carried by the float service. The railcar barges held fourteen 40-foot (12.2 m) railcars. Some of the railcars were chlorine tankers bound for the water treatment plant. Another cargo was Kessler Whiskey for the Seagram’s facility in South San Francisco. In a famous incident a whiskey tanker was among cars that rolled off the barge in mid-bay during foul weather. Another cargo was box cars of newsprint for the San Francisco Chronicle.

Transportation patterns changed with time. Piggy-back truck service increased as direct railcar service declined. The Chronicle at the urging of the railroad switched to piggy-back truck delivery. As the use of the cross-bay float service declined Santa Fe reduced the tug fleet. The Engel was sold in 1969, and the Hayden was sold in 1976. The Hastings continued as the only tug until 1984. On May 4, 1984, a fire at the Richmond ferry slip killed cross-bay float service, and the Hastings was sold.

== Barge routes ==
There were many routes across the bay over the years. At the height of freight ferry operations, Santa Fe tugs and barges called at many slips around the bay. A slip at the foot of Alice St. in Oakland served isolated Santa Fe industrial trackage. Across the Oakland estuary, a slip at the foot of Sherman St. in Alameda, California, where short line Alameda Belt Line (owned half and half by Western Pacific Railroad and the Santa Fe Railroad) received cars from its parent roads. This slip was abandoned around 1970, and thereafter, Southern Pacific Railroad delivered Alameda Belt Line cars via their Fruitvale lift bridge in Oakland. Santa Fe tugs also served the State Belt Railroad's slip at Pier 43 in San Francisco, and the Northwestern Pacific Railroad's slip at Tiburon in Marin County.

The final route for the cross-bay service went from the ferry slip in Richmond, California on the east side of the bay to China Basin on the west side of the bay. China Basin is on the San Francisco Peninsula just south of the San Francisco–Oakland Bay Bridge. The 10.4-mile (16.7 km) voyage usually took about an hour and twenty minutes each way.

== History of the tugboat fleet ==
=== Before World War II ===
Prior to the end of World War II there were five tugs used on San Francisco Bay at various times:

- Richmond, built new for the Santa Fe by Fulton Iron Works in 1899. Sold to Crowley Tugboat Company in December 1925.
- A.H. Payson, built new for the Santa Fe in 1902 by Boole & Sons, Oakland CA. She remained in Santa Fe service its entire life, retired in 1948 and was sold for scrap in 1950.
- E.P. Ripley, built new for the Santa Fe in 1907 by Kruse & Banks, North Bend OR, also sold for scrap in 1950. Ripley was president of the railroad from 1896-1920.
- W.B. Storey, built in Elizabeth, New Jersey, in 1919 as Basford by Bethlehem Steel, was purchased used by the Santa Fe in August 1923. It was used for 25 years, then laid up for parts, the remains sold for scrap in 1966. Storey was president of the railroad from 1920-1933.
- A.G. Wells, built at Superior, Wisconsin as Hukey in 1919, was purchased used by the Santa Fe in September 1925. She was commandeered by the U.S. Government in 1943 and not returned.

=== After World War II ===
All three postwar tugs had steel hulls and entered service powered by a steam engine driving a single screw. In the mid-1960s the Hastings and Hayden were dieselized, but the Engel never was.

- Edward J. Engel Santa Fe contracted with Consolidated Steel at Newport Beach, CA to construct a new "streamlined" tug. Launched in May 1945 Engle served till the late '60s. Edward J. Engel, the namesake of the Engle, was the president of the railroad from 1939 to 1944.

During World War II the US Army had many tugboats built. As the war concluded Santa Fe acquired two of the LT (Large Tug) vessels for use in its cross-bay float service and another was built directly for them. All were named after prominent persons in the railroad:

- Paul P. Hastings, named after the VP of Traffic for the railroad at the time of his retirement in 1941. Hastings was the brother of Milo Hastings and grandson of Pardee Butler.
- John R. Hayden, named after the assistant to Mr. Engel.

== Paul P. Hastings ==
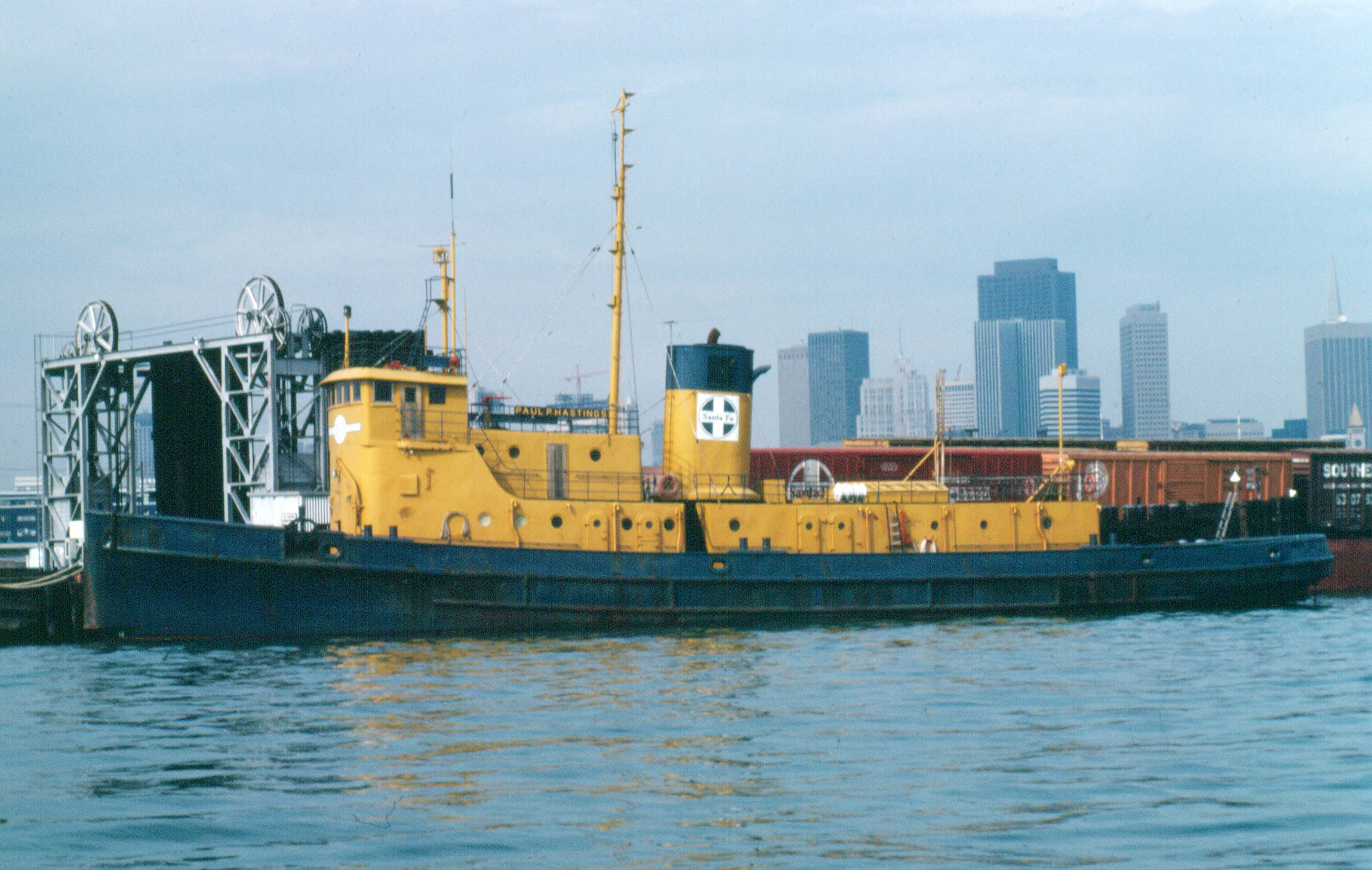
- The tugboat Paul P. Hastings in China Basin, San Francisco in 1982. At this time she was the last of the Santa Fe Railroad tugs still in service

History
- Name: LT 814
- Owner: US Army
- Builder: Marietta Manufacturing Co.
- Christened: 1945
- Fate: Sold February 11, 1948 and renamed Paul P. Hastings

History
- Name: Paul P. Hastings
- Owner: Atchison, Topeka and Santa Fe Railway
- Fate: Sold to American Navigation and renamed Terminator

History
- Name: Terminator
- Owner: American Navigation
- Fate: Sank north of Point Arena in 1992

General characteristics
- Length: 142 ft (43 m)
- Depth: 16 ft (4.9 m)
- Installed power: 1945:1,200 hp (890 kW) three-cylinder Skinner Uniflow steam engine; 1967—1991:1,600 hp (1,200 kW) General Motors 567C EMD F-7 engine
- Propulsion: single screw

The tugboat Paul P. Hastings was built in 1945 at Point Pleasant, West Virginia by the Marietta Manufacturing Co. as hull number 530 for the United States Army. The original name was LT 814 (LT the designation meaning "Large Tugboat"). She had a single screw powered by a three-cylinder Skinner Uniflow steam engine of 1,200 hp (890 kW) served by twin Babcock & Wilcox water tube boilers. Dimensions were 142 ft (43 m) long, 33 ft (10 m) in breadth, 16 ft (4.9 m) deep, a tonnage of 480 gross register tons (GRT), and 68 net register tons (NRT).

On February 11, 1948, she was sold to the Atchison, Topeka & Santa Fe Railroad Co. of San Francisco and renamed A.T.&S.F. No. 8, VIN D256253, Call Sign WD9219. She was later renamed the Paul P. Hastings, in honor of Paul P. Hastings, the vice-president of traffic for the railroad, who died in 1947.

In 1964 the vessel was dieselized at the Todd Shipyard in Alameda, California with a 1,600 hp (1,200 kW) General Motors 567C EMD F-7 engine.

The Paul P. Hastings had the longest period of service of the three post-war tugs: 36 years from 1948 until the railroad discontinued service in 1984. By the end she was the sole remnant of the tug fleet.

The Paul P. Hastings was sold and eventually became owned by Robert Whipple of American Navigation (AmNav), a company still doing business in the Bay area. The Abstract of Title shows Levin Metals Corp., a scrap dealer, as an intermediate owner starting at an unspecified date with Whipple taking title on February 26, 1991. The vessel was renamed Terminator. One source says the tug sat unused for years. In about 1991 Whipple, who had a reputation for added huge amounts of horsepower to old tugs, added two additional 3,600 hp (2,700 kW) diesel engines. The tug was not inspected by the United States Coast Guard after the engines were added.

The first job for the upgraded tug was to assist the Dock Express 20, a multi-purpose vessel of Dutch registry owned by Dock-Express Shipping B.V, in laying a fiber cable off Point Arena, California. Point Arena is north of San Francisco about 100 miles (160 km) and is the closest point on the west coast of the continental United States to Japan, hence is the landing point for many trans-Pacific cables.

The Terminator became a victim of a marine casualty: she sank. Details of the sinking are found in the US Coast Guard Marine Casualty investigation MC93011836 and Marine Violation investigation MV92003258.

Late in the day of Monday, January 27, 1992, the vessels were about 20 nautical miles (37 km) off the coast of California just north of Point Arena at N39°9.0', W124°10.5'. The weather was ugly: swell height was 15 feet (4.6 m) and increasing, wind speed was 35 knots (65 km/h). Trouble started when a two-inch cable parted at the Sampson braid and the Terminator had to approach the Dock Express 20. It was now a little after 6 pm in deepening twilight (sunset was 5:31 pm).

Shortly after completing her approach to 100–150 feet (30–50 m) abeam of the Dock Express 20, Terminator lost the use of the center engine. The operator attempted to use the port and starboard engines in a twisting fashion to maneuver the vessel out of danger. Then the starboard engine tripped off-line leaving the Terminator with only one of three engines operating. Attempts to restart the starboard engine failed. The high seas were abeam (perpendicular) to the vessel and pushed her into the protruding sponson (a structure on the side of the ship) of the Dock Express 20, who was restricted in her ability to maneuver as a result of her cable laying operation and because of its size was much less affected by the seas. When the vessels collided the Terminator was coming down off the crest of a swell, while the Dock Express 20 was surging upwards from another wave.

The impact created a hole, estimated at 1 to 2 feet (0.3 to 0.6 m) in diameter, in the Terminator's aft lazarette area (a storage space between decks). The incoming water flooded the shaft alley. The watertight door between the shaft alley and main engine compartment was permanently affixed open. A cutting torch was needed before the door could be secured. This process took 20 minutes and only slowed the water coming into the engine room. Pumps to de-water the vessel operated only intermittently. There was no eductor (a type of water pump). The aft peak tank and bilge were filled with concrete (presumably for stability) and this extra weight could not be shifted to another area of the vessel from where the vessel was taking on water.

With the ship starting to sink the order to abandon ship was given about an hour after the collision. After 15 minutes only the bow was visible and after another 10 minutes, the vessel was completely underwater. All crew members entered the life raft and were picked up an hour later by the Craig Foss, a nearby tug which was diverted to assist. The Terminator sank in 800 fathoms (1,500 m). About 35,000 US gallons (130,000 L) of diesel fuel onboard spilled creating a light sheen in the vicinity which dissipated in a few days without cleanup. The vessel owner, Whipple, was fined $2,100 for the oil spill.

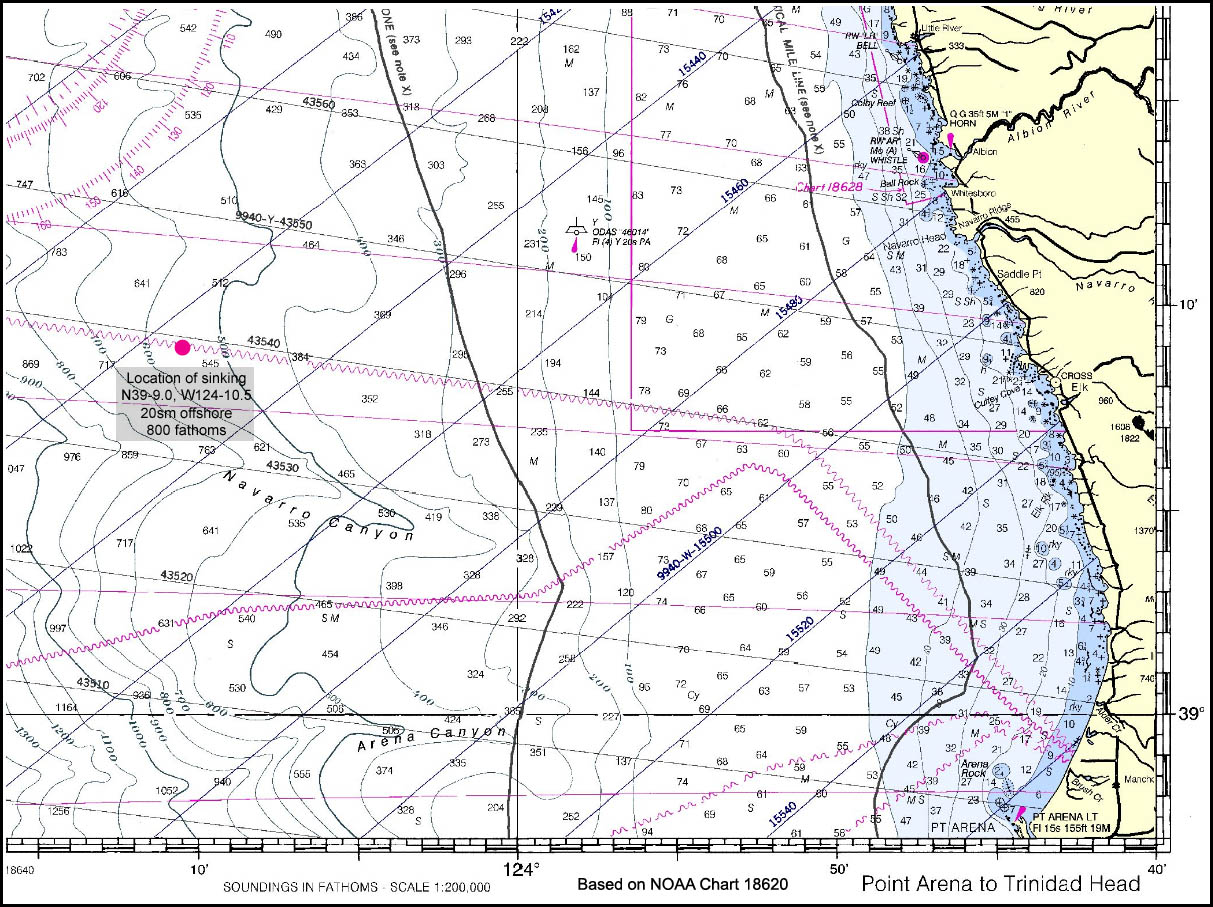
NOAA chart 18620 with the location of the Terminator sinking marked. The ocean is 800 fathoms (1,500 m) deep where she rests 20 nautical miles (37 km) offshore.

== Edward J. Engel ==
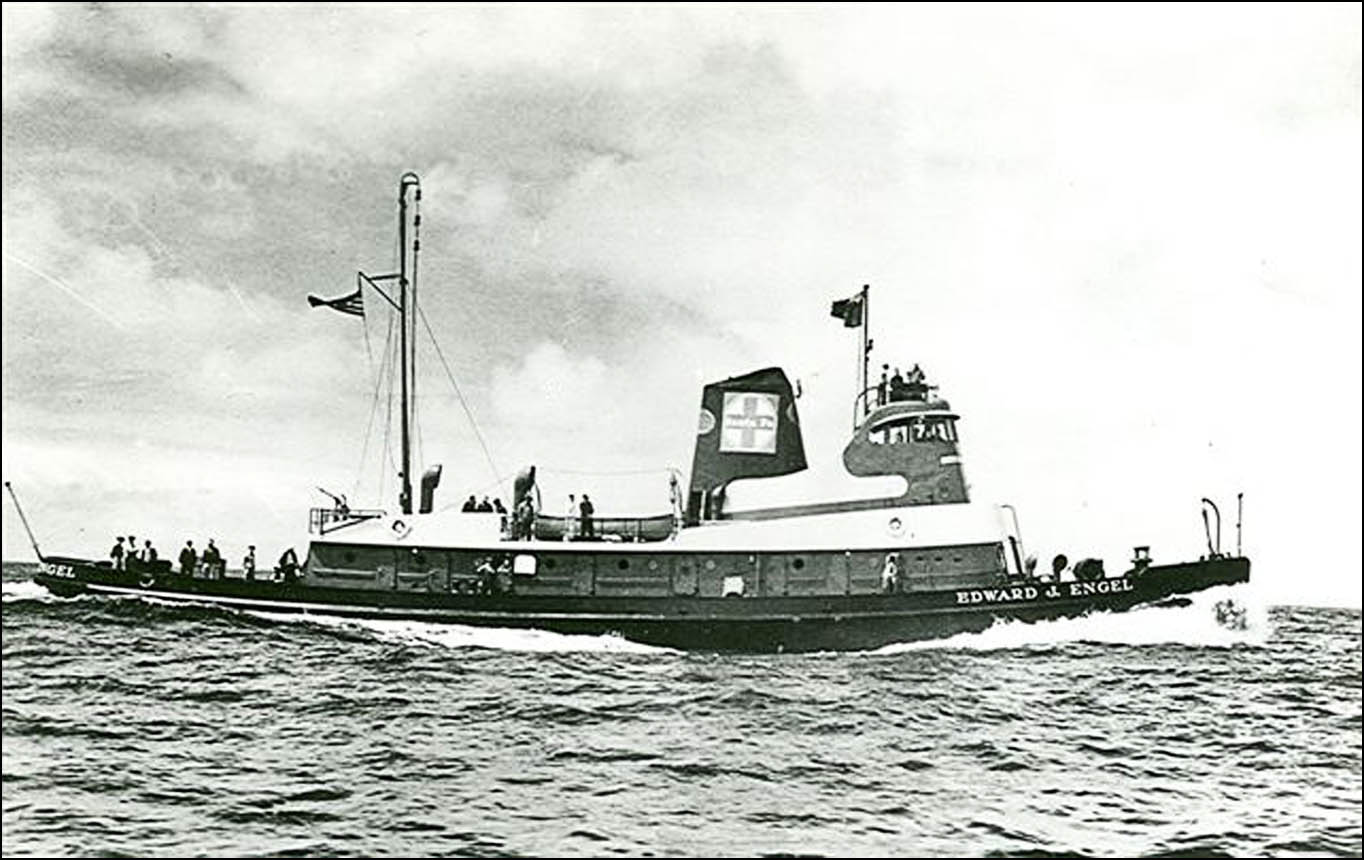
- The Edward J. Engel just after she was built in 1945 undergoing her sea trials. Note the fire monitor astern.

History
- Name: Edward J Engel
- Owner: Atchison, Topeka and Santa Fe Railway
- Christened: 1945
- Fate: Sold and renamed Respect before 1975

History
- Name: Respect
- Fate: Sank in 2007, raised 2013, scrapped 2014

General characteristics
- Length: 141 feet (43 m)
- Depth: 15 feet (4.6 m)
- Installed power: 1,200 ihp (890 kW) 2-cylinder 25 x 20 Skinner Uniflow steam engine
- Propulsion: single screw
- Crew: 8

The Engel was built in 1945 for the Atchison, Topeka and Santa Fe Railway Company by Consolidated Steel Corporation as hull number 1320.

The Engel had a single screw and a steel hull of dimensions 141.5×29×12.7 ft (43.1×8.8×3.9 m). She was powered by a three-cylinder Skinner Uniflow steam engine, 25 x 20, 1,200 ihp (890 kW) Babcock & Wilcox water tube boiler, with a 3,311 sq ft (307.6 m^{2}) heating surface, which provided 236 psi (1.63 MPa) working pressure. She retained this steam power plant at the time of her sinking in 2007. Her sister tugs were built with steam and later dieselized. Her VIN number was 248085.

On September 30, 1969 with barge traffic declining as piggy-back truck usage increased, the Santa Fe sold the Engel to John K. Seaborn, a collector of old tugs and ferries. The sale was not recorded until June 25, 1971. On September 18, 1975 the vessel was removed from documentation because the name was changed to Respect without the consent of the Documentation Officer at the vessel’s home port who at that time had no record of the whereabouts of the vessel or owner.

The next entry in the Abstract of Title for the Engel is on February 24, 2006 when Seaborn sold the vessel to Sause Marine Services, Inc. in the person of Gary Sause. Sause intended to dieselize the vessel whose hull was still in good condition. When Sause received an unsolicited bid for the vessel from Jeff Barnell he accepted it. What Barnell intended to do with the vessel is unknown. In any case he soon sold it to Ron Cook of British Columbia. The Engel/Respect had now changed hands three times in a little over a year. Cook planned to move the vessel to Seattle and restore it. There had been other attempts to restore and preserve the Engel. The Newport Harbor Nautical Museum, near where the tug was built, was contacted but showed no interest. There are several references in Trainorders.COM in the fall of 2006 about saving the Engel.

For many years the Engel had been anchored in the Oakland estuary in Oakland, California just west of the Park Street bridge. The tug was vandalized on April 9, 2007 and sank the next day. She likely began taking on water following the removal of the brass seacock valve (used to cool the engine with seawater) for its scrap value. Following the sinking, she was under the administration of the U.S. Army Corps of Engineers. As of February 2008 she remained submerged in the estuary, and her location was marked with buoys and a flashing light. On December 20, 2013, she was raised and removed from her sunken location where she impeded a navigable waterway. Her last transit out the estuary was attached to the bow of the DB GENERAL pushed by the TUG FAT CAT. Following raising, the wreck needed to decontaminated, as she contained a large amount of asbestos and oil, as well as contaminated sediment. Following decontamination, the superstructure of the Engle/Respect was removed at Bay Ship and Yacht before the rest of the hull was scrapped at a U.S. Army Corps of Engineers dock in Sausalito in early 2014.

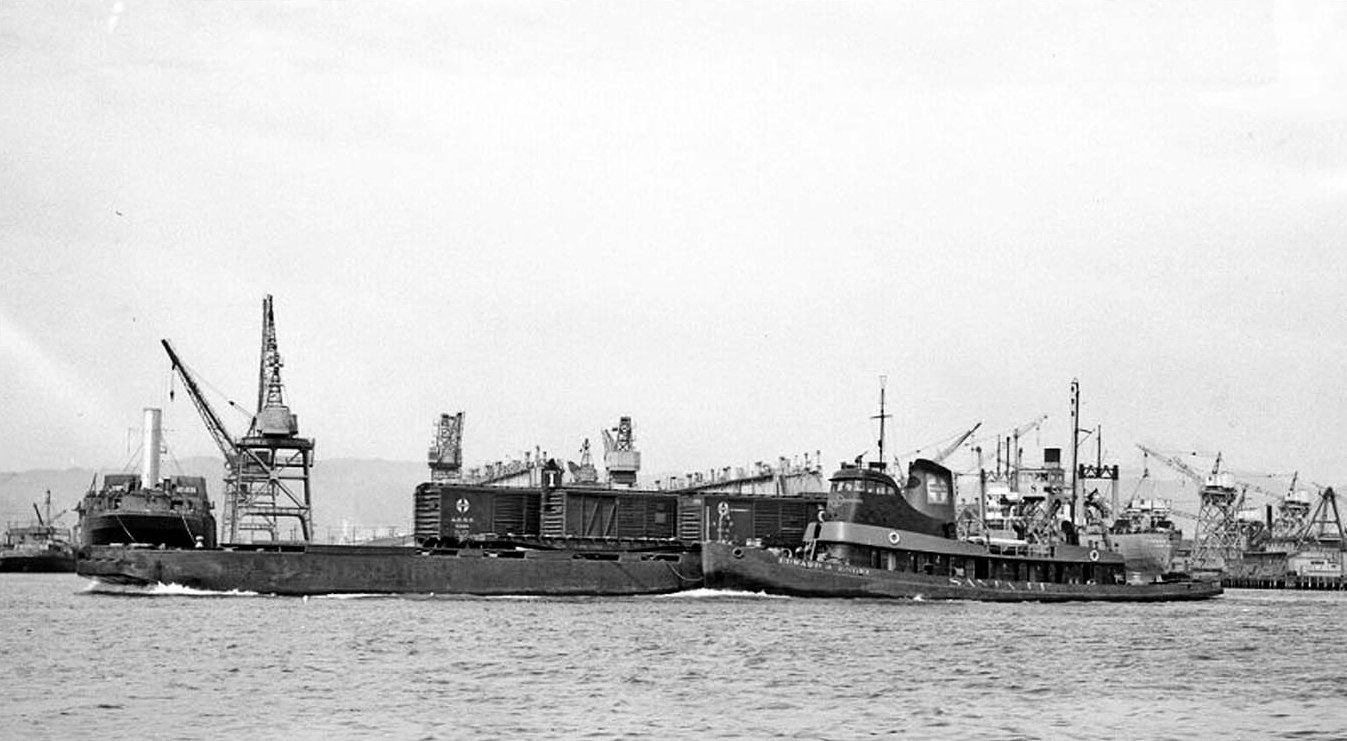
The Edward J. Engel tugboat with carfloat #8 in the Oakland, California estuary

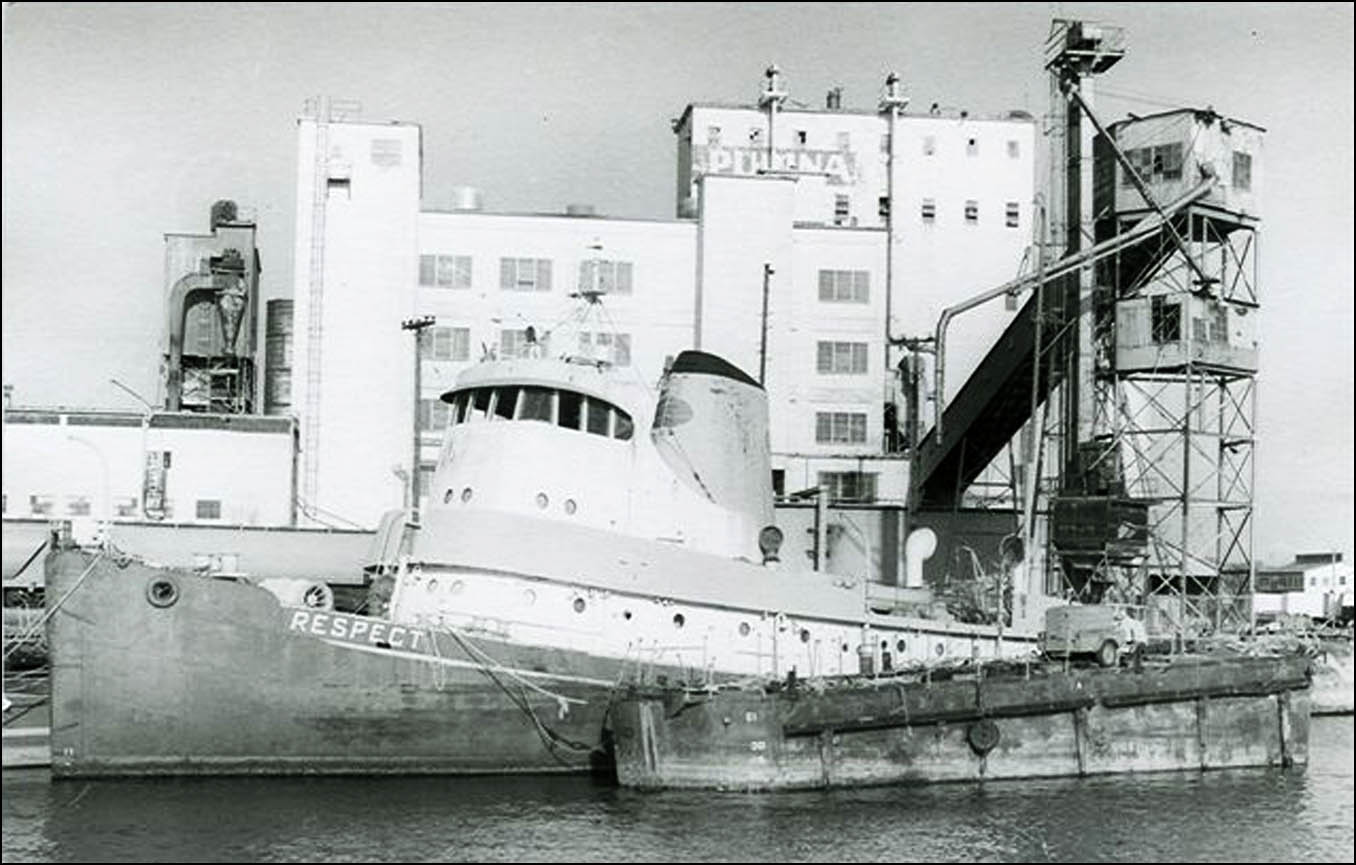
The former Edward J. Engel tugboat as Respect in Oakland, California 1982

== John R. Hayden ==
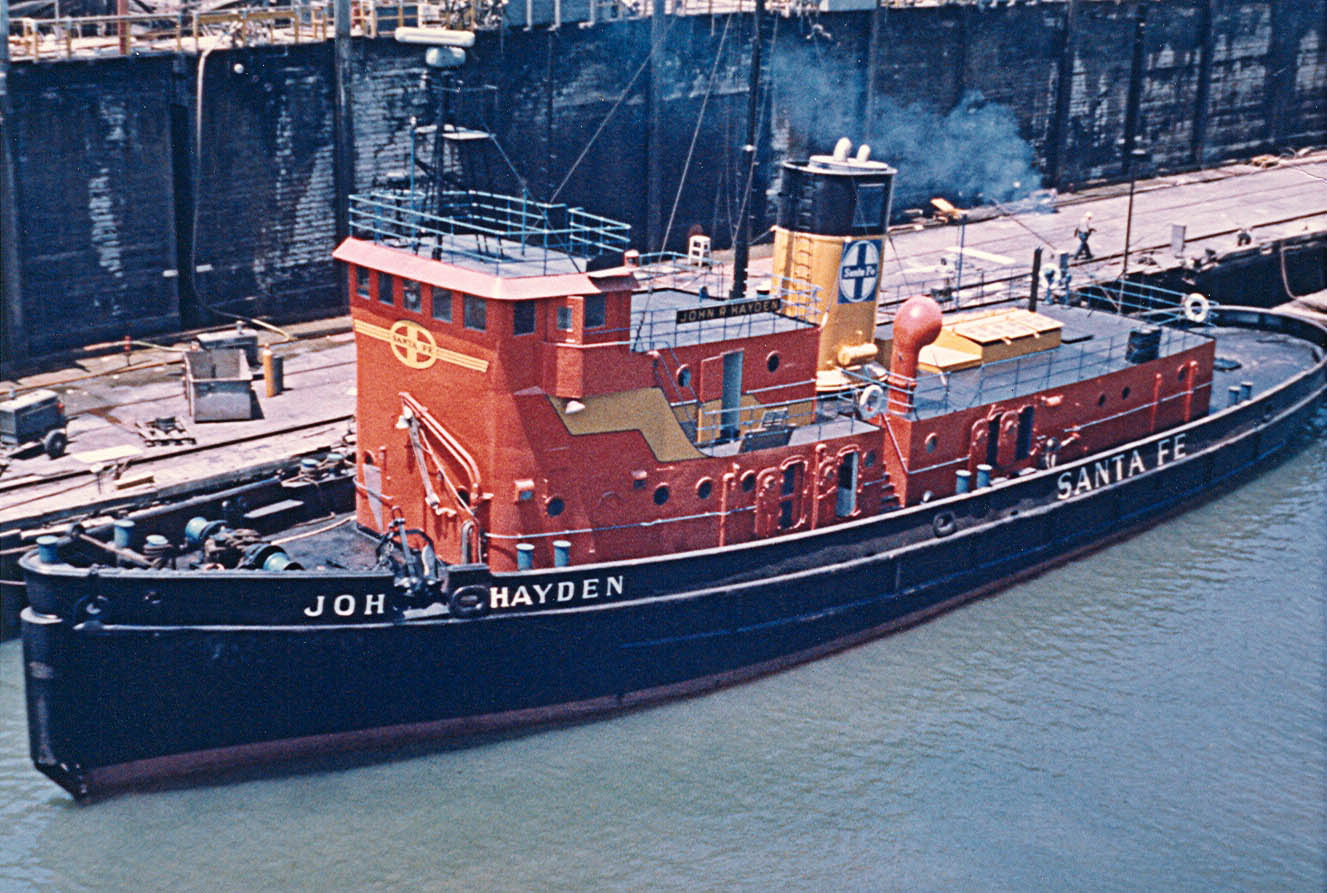
- The John R. Hayden tugboat at the Todd shipyard in Alameda, California where she was dieselized. She was built in 1945 for the War Department as Large Tug LT-830. The tug is painted in "Warbonnet" colors which were similar to the Santa Fe diesel-electric locomotives of the time.

History
- Name: LT 830
- Builder: Tampa Marine Corp.
- Christened: 1945
- Fate: Purchased by Santa Fe Railroad on June 5, 1947 and renamed John R Hayden

History
- Name: John R Hayden
- Owner: Atchison, Topeka and Santa Fe Railway
- Fate: Sold September 16, 1976 and renamed Marine Crusader

History
- Name: Marine Crusader
- Owner: Marine Leasing Corp
- Fate: Sold to Sause Bros Ocean Towing in 1990

History
- Name: Titan
- Owner: Sause Bros Ocean Towing
- Fate: Put up for sale in 2016 Unknown - Listed for sale in 2016

General characteristics
- Length: 144.2 feet (44.0 m)
- Depth: 16 feet (4.9 m)
- Installed power: 1945: 1,200 ihp (890 kW) 3-cylinder 24 x 20 Skinner Uniflow steam engine; 1967: 1,600 hp (1,200 kW) General Motors 567C EMD F-7 diesel engine; 1990: Two 12-cylinder turbo EMD engines
- Propulsion: single screw

The John R. Hayden is the only tug of the Santa Fe post World War II tug fleet that remains afloat. She was built in 1945 by the U.S. War Department and is now the Titan owned by Sause Bros. and operating out of Coos Bay, Oregon. She had several other owners and names. She was repowered three times. The VI number (VIN) of the tug is 253495, IMO Number is 8424123.

The Hayden was built in 1945, the final year of World War II, by Tampa Marine Corp. in Tampa, Florida as hull number 40 and designated LT-830 (LT for Large Tug). Dimensions were 142.2 ft (43.3 m) × 33 ft (10 m) × 16 ft (4.9 m), tonnage 581 gt, 35 nt. She had a single screw.

On June 5, 1947, she was sold to the Atchison, Topeka and Santa Fe Railway who renamed her the John R. Hayden. When built the vessel was powered by a three-cylinder Skinner Uniflow steam engine, 24.5 × 20", 1,200 ihp (890 kW), supplied by two Foster-Wheeler water tube boilers, 5,460 sq ft (507 m^{2}) heating surface, 225 psi (1.55 MPa) working pressure. In 1967 the Santa Fe had her dieselized at the Todd Shipyard in Alameda, California with a 1,600 hp (1,200 kW) General Motors 567C EMD F-7 engine. In December, 1975 the Hayden was taken out of service due to persistent stern tube leakage.

On September 16, 1976, with barge traffic in decline, the Santa Fe sold the Hayden to Marine Leasing Corp. Marine Leasing repowered the tug, which required rebuilding the superstructure. On December 22, 1983, Marine Leasing renamed the vessel the Marine Crusader. Her home port was then Seattle, Washington.

The repowering of the Marine Crusader was done by Propulsion Systems Inc. of Kent, Washington. The repowered tug put to sea in December 1983 as one of the most highly computerized and automated tugs in the world. It also represented the most complete installation to date of a ship control and monitoring system. The new engines consisted of four General Motors Detroit Diesel 16-cylinder, 1600 hp 149T1 diesel engines with a pair of twin-shaft input/single-shaft output Lufkin reduction gears with controllable-pitch propellers. The control system provided automatic engine load control, multiple engine load sharing, pitch control, machinery monitoring, and steering. The control complex involved two electrically isolated units, port and starboard. Machinery control function was divided between the units, each managing its own propulsion subsystem consisting of two engines, reduction gears with clutches and hydraulics for controllable-pitch propeller. There was an automatic pilot function driven by either gyrocompass or magnetic compass as the input heading source. There were four control station in the tug: main bridge, wing stations port and starboard, and an aft control station. All control systems operated off a non-interruptible power system.

As rebuilt, the Marine Crusader had a beam of 33 feet (10 m). A new epoxy coating was applied to the hull. She had quarters for an operating crew of eight. She had a gym in the forecastle, a useful accoutrement on long, ocean tow missions. With full tanks the Marine Crusader carried 225,000 gallons of fuel.

On November 26, 1984 Marine Crusader was sold to Alaska Marine Towing Inc. On February 5, 1985 Marine Leasing changed her name to Harris Bay, after a bay in the Kenai Peninsula south of Anchorage, Alaska. Alaska Marine ran into financial difficulties and filed for bankruptcy. As part of an August 3, 1988 reorganization the new legal owner of the Harris Bay became United Marine Tug and Barge. On August 29, 1988 they changed her name back to Marine Crusader.

Two years later on July 27, 1990 the tug was sold yet again to its current owner Sause Bros. Ocean Towing of Portland, Oregon. Sause Bros. soon gave the tug her current name, Titan, and repowered her with two 12-cylinder turbo EMD engines, with 3½ to 1 Lufkin gears.

Sause has since removed the Titan from service and maintained her laid up in Coos Bay after removing the EMD engines they had installed previously rather than choosing to rebuild them. After determining it would not be cost-effective to repower a 70-year-old hull the decision was made to dispose of the Titan.

It is currently unknown if Titan still remains today, although it is very likely that it is still laid up somewhere in Oregon, despite the fact that it does not appear to be visible anywhere along recent Google Maps imagery in Coos Bay.

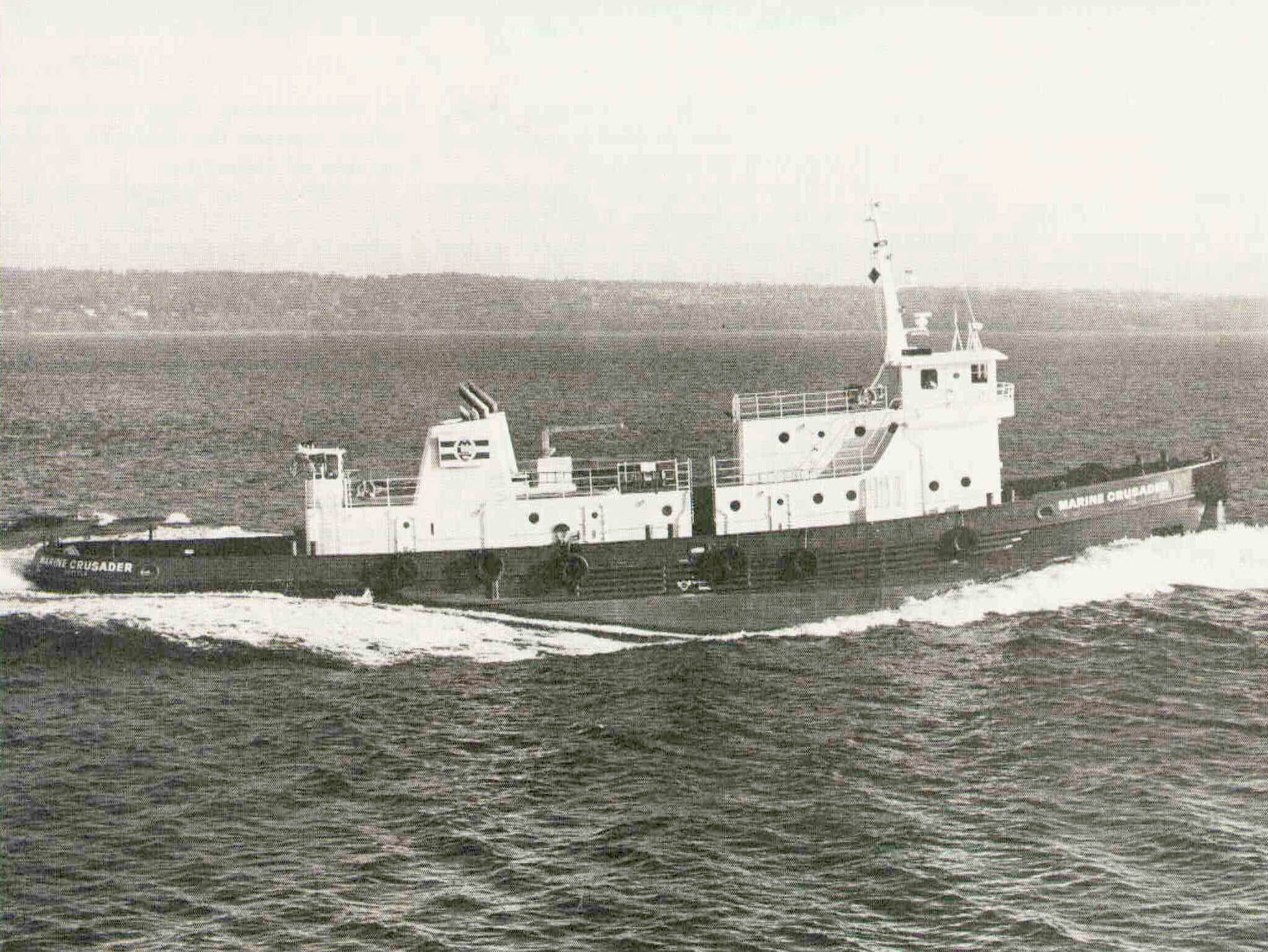
The John R. Hayden tugboat when she was the Marine Crusader in 1983–1985 and again in 1988–1990

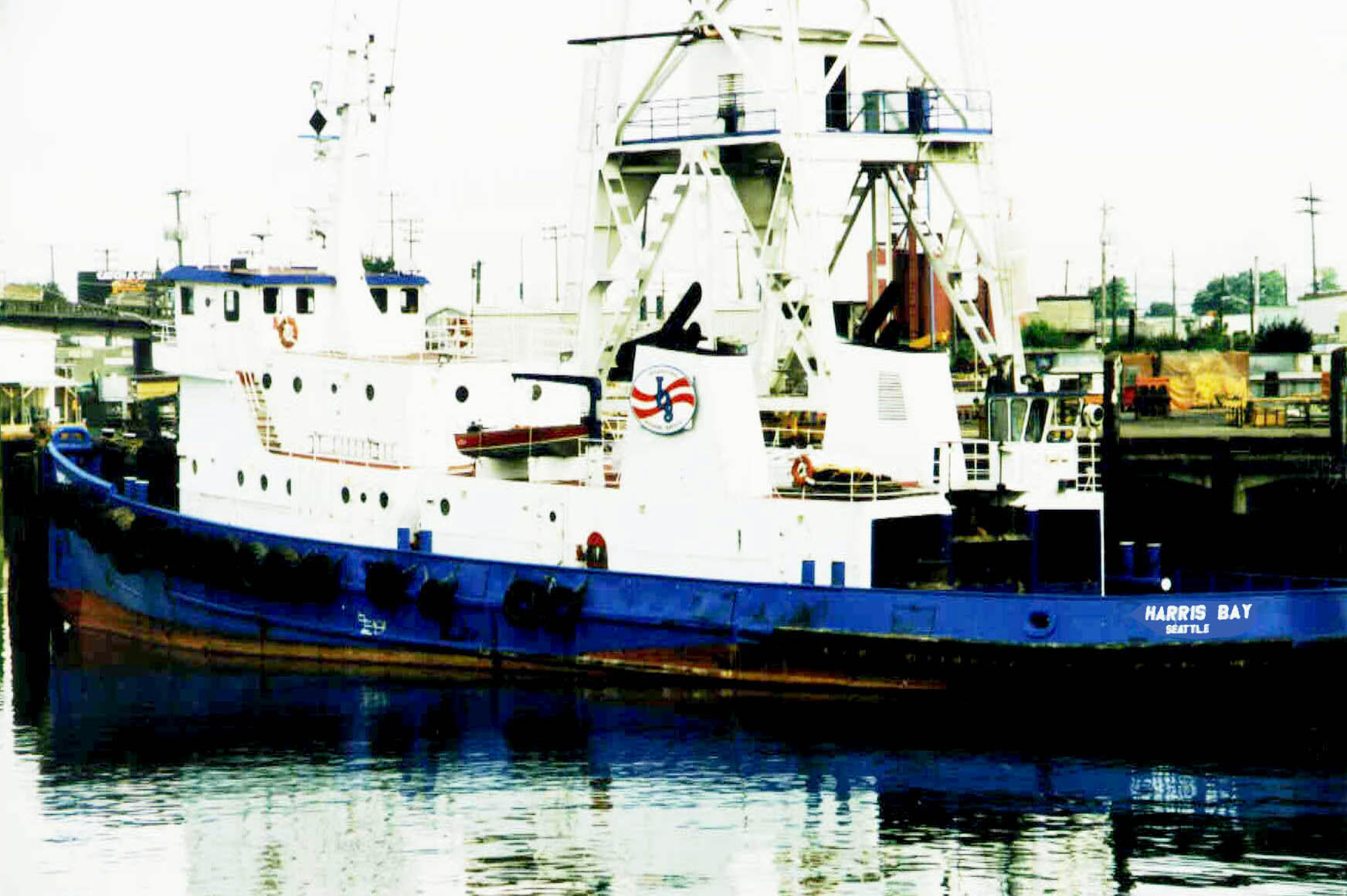
The John R. Hayden tugboat when she was the Harris Bay in the late 1980s at the Marine Power and Equipment docks in Seattle, Washington

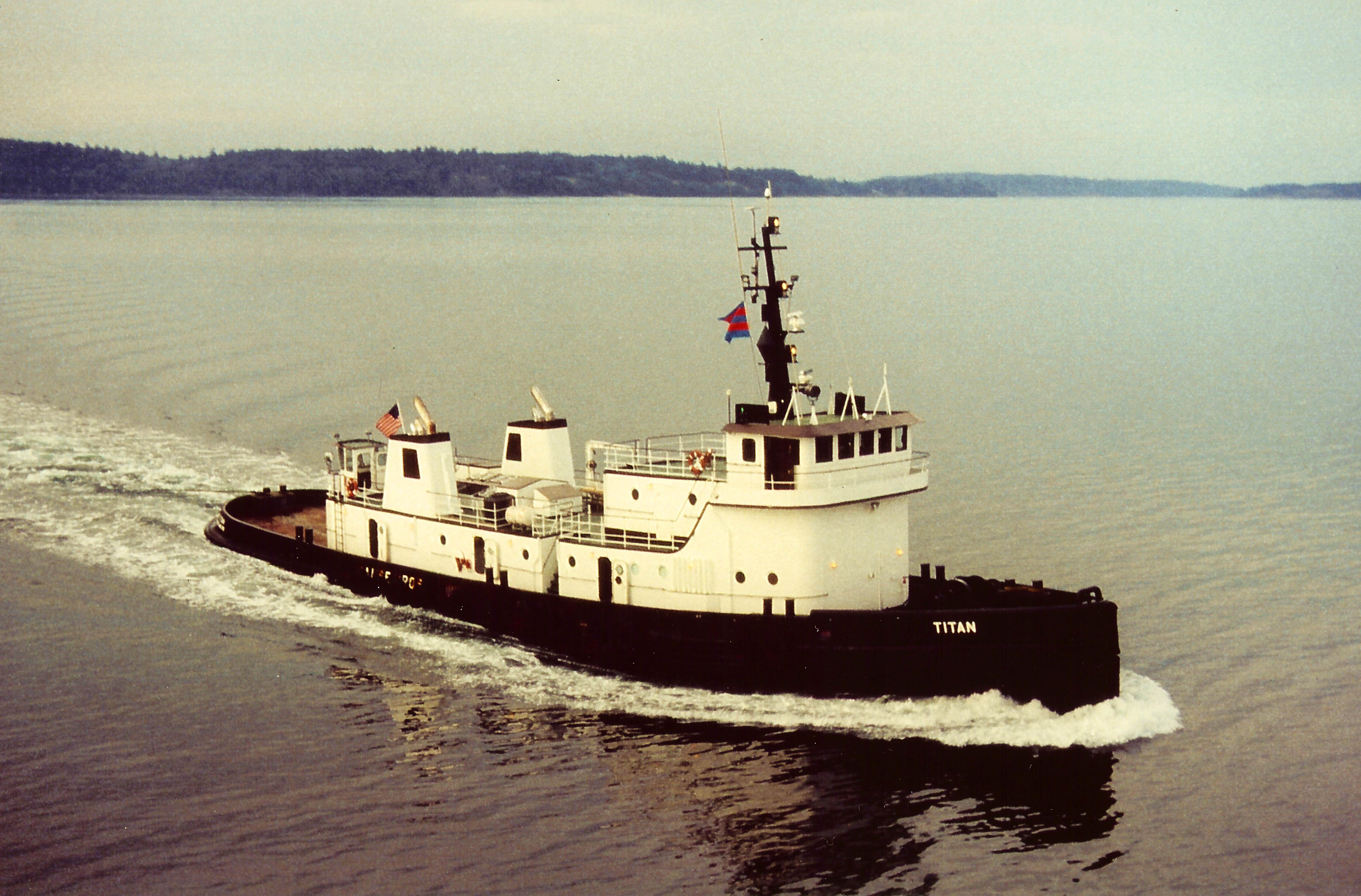
The John R. Hayden tugboat, after several changes of owners and names and repowerings, is now owned by Sause Bros. and named Titan. She sails out of Coos Bay, Oregon

== Bibliography ==
- Krieger, Jack L.; Icanberry, Glen (1983). Valley Division Vignettes. Valley Rail Press, Hanford, CA.
