= Farmington, Kansas =

- Unincorporated community
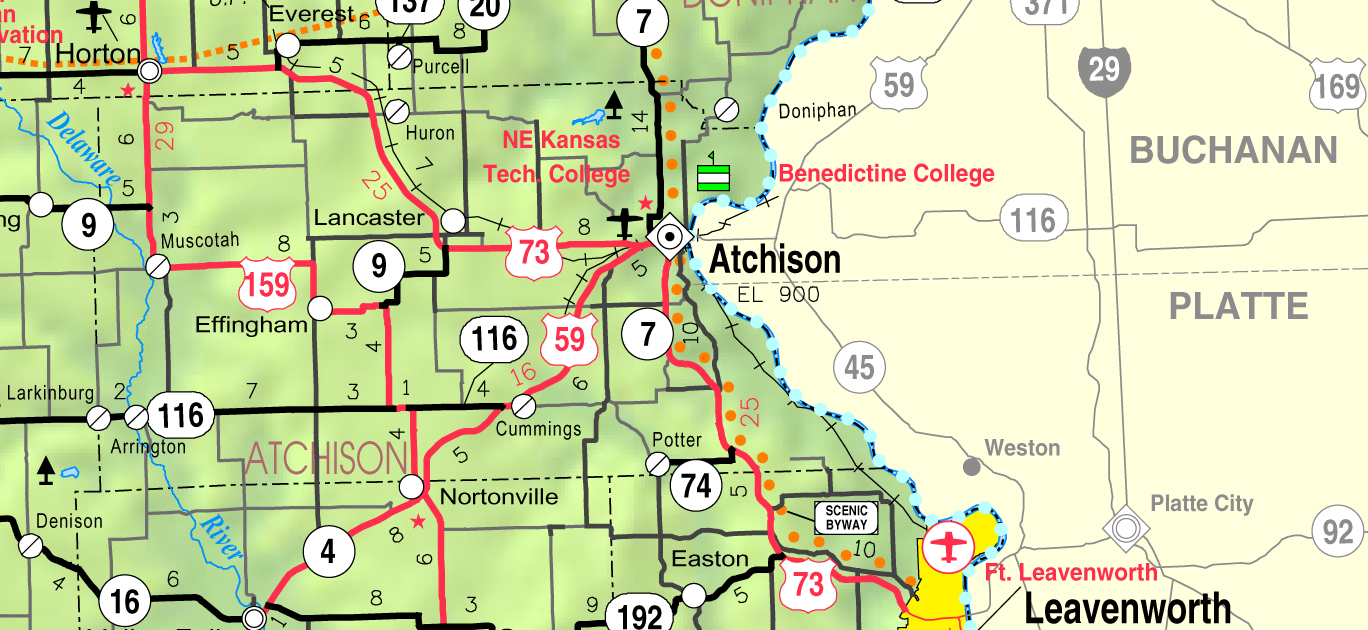
- KDOT map of Atchison County (legend)

- Location within Kansas Location within the United States
- Coordinates: 39°31′7″N 95°18′35″W
- Country: United States
- State: Kansas
- County: Atchison
- Township: Center
- Elevation: 1,030 ft (310 m)
- Time zone: UTC-6 (CST)
  - Summer (DST): UTC-5 (CDT)
- ZIP Code: 66023
- Area code: 913
- FIPS code: 20-23150
- GNIS ID: 473485

Farmington is an unincorporated community in Center Township, Atchison County, Kansas, United States.

== History ==
Farmington had its start by the building of the Missouri Pacific Railroad through that territory.

The post office was opened in 1868, and remained in operation until it was discontinued in 1940.

== Notable people ==
- Pardee Butler - Free-State advocate, abolitionist, preacher
- Milo Hastings - Inventor
