= Mafuta (ship) =

Diamond-mining ship

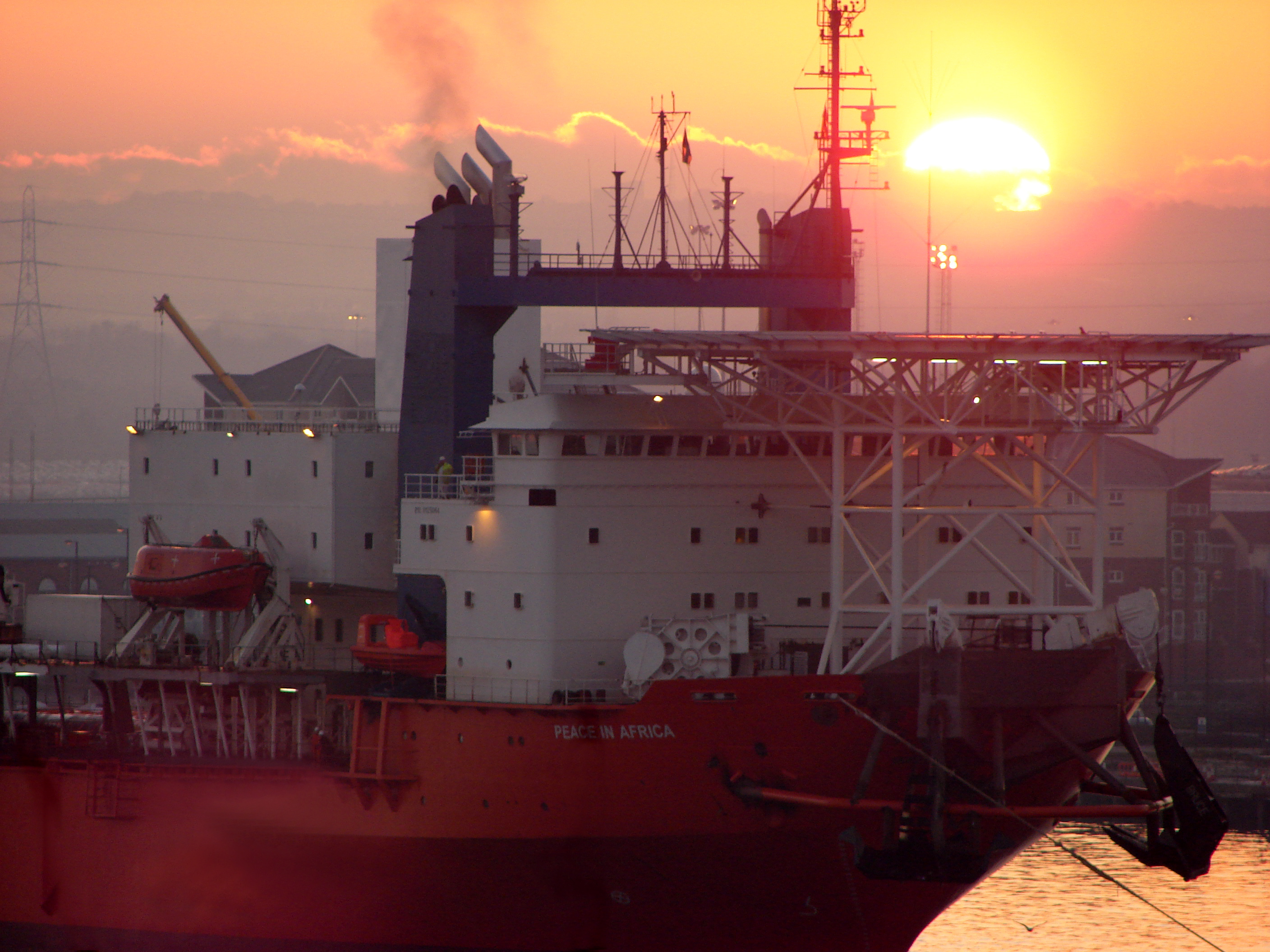
- Peace in Africa during the 2006 refitting on the Tyne.

History
- Name: Dock Express 20 (1983–2006); Peace in Africa (2006–2013); Mafuta (2013-)
- Owner: Dock Express Shipping (1983–1994); Dockwise (1994–2006); De Beers Marine (2006–2012); Debmarine Namibia (2012-)
- Port of registry: Netherlands Antilles (1983–2005); South Africa (2005–2012); Namibia (2012-)
- Builder: Verolme Shipyard Heusden, Netherlands
- Yard number: 994
- Laid down: 1982
- Launched: 12 November 1982
- Completed: May 1983
- Identification: IMO number: 8125064; MMSI number: 659389000; Call sign: V5DX
- Status: In service

General characteristics (as built)
- Type: Heavy lift ship
- Tonnage: 14,793 GT; 4,437 NT; 14,617 DWT
- Length: LOA 169.52 m (556.2 ft); LPP 126.50 m (415.0 ft)
- Beam: 24.20 m (79.4 ft)
- Draught: 8.9 m (29.2 ft)
- Depth: 15 m (49.2 ft)
- Main engines: 2 × Stork-Werkspoor 6TM410 (2 × 3,128 kW)
- Auxiliary engines: 2 × 600 kW
- Propulsion: 2 × CPP; 625 kW bow thruster
- Speed: 16 kn (30 km/h; 18 mph)
- Capacity: 2,576 m^{2} (27,730 sq ft) cargo deck
- Crew: 24

General characteristics (1993)
- Type: Cable ship
- Displacement: 21,731 tons
- Draught: 8.79 m (28.8 ft)
- Propulsion: Azimuth thrusters (3 × 1,325 kW)
- Speed: 12.5 knots (23.2 km/h; 14.4 mph)
- Range: 20,500 nautical miles (38,000 km; 23,600 mi)
- Capacity: 10,000 tons of cable, 100 repeaters
- Crew: 85

General characteristics (2007)
- Type: Dredger
- Tonnage: 15,854 GT; 7,935 DWT
- Crew: 68

Mafuta is a diamond-mining ship owned and operated by De Beers in the western coast of South Africa. Built in 1983 as Dock Express 20 for Dock Express Shipping (later Dockwise), the semisubmersible, multirole, heavy-lift vessel was converted to the world's largest cable layer in 1993. In 2005, she was purchased by De Beers, and converted to a subsea diamond-mining ship by A&P Tyne over the course of 11 months. The ship's new name, Peace in Africa, may have implied that it was providing an alternative to blood diamonds. In 2013, still under ownership of De Beers Marine Namibia, the vessel was renamed to MV Mafuta.

== Construction ==
Then named Dock Express 20, the ship's keel was laid in 1982 in the Netherlands at Verolme Shipyard Heusden, and it was launched the following year. Originally a heavy-lift ship, it has an overall length of 169.52 m (556.2 ft). The ship has a beam (width) of 24.20 m (79.4 ft). Her height from the top of the keel to the main deck, called the moulded depth, is 15 m (49 ft).

The ship's gross tonnage, a measure of the volume of all its enclosed spaces, is 14,793 m^{3}. Its net tonnage, which measures the volume of the cargo spaces, is 4,437 m^{3}. Its total carrying capacity in terms of weight, is 14,617 long tons deadweight (DWT), the equivalent of roughly 300 adult male sperm whales.

Dock Express 20 was powered by two Stork-Werkspoor 6TM410 four-stroke, medium-speed, marine diesel engines of 3,128 kW (4,195 hp) apiece. Each engine powered an independent controllable-pitch propeller. This main propulsion system was able to move the ship at 16 knots (30 km/h; 18 mph). For harbour maneuvering, the vessel was also fitted with a 625 kW bow thruster. In addition, the ship has two 600-kilowatt (800 hp) auxiliary generators to provide shipboard electrical power. When the Dock Express 20 was converted to a dynamically positioned cable ship, she was refitted with three 1,325 kilowatts (1,777 hp) azimuth thrusters to serve as its main propulsion.

Dock Express 20 was originally built to house 24 crewmembers, but that number was more than tripled in the 1993 conversion. In 2007, the ship was converted again to work as a dredger, increasing the gross tonnage to 15,854, and the deadweight tonnage to 7,935 long tons.

== Career ==
=== Early career ===
Dock Express 20 was built for use in the offshore oil industry.

The Dock Express 20 was involved in the sinking of the tugboat Terminator some 20 mi (32 km) off the coast of California on 27 January 1992. Following an engine failure, the heavy seas pushed the tugboat against one of the protruding stern sponsons of the heavy-lift vessel, causing enough damage to sink the vessel in 25 minutes. The crew evacuated to a life raft and was picked up by another ship.

=== Cable layer ===
The ship was converted to a cable layer by Tyco Submarine Systems, and worked under charter to this company.

Dock Express 20 is pictured on the Russian postcard commemorating a submarine cable between Denmark and Russia. The ship laid a 1,200 km (750 mi) cable from Copenhagen to Kingiseppe, which connects via microwave to Moscow and St. Petersburg.

Dock Express 20 was one of three ships that worked on the northern section of the Pacific Crossing-1 (PC-1) system cable, linking the United States and Japan. It also laid telecommunications cable between San Francisco and Guam.

=== Diamond mining ===
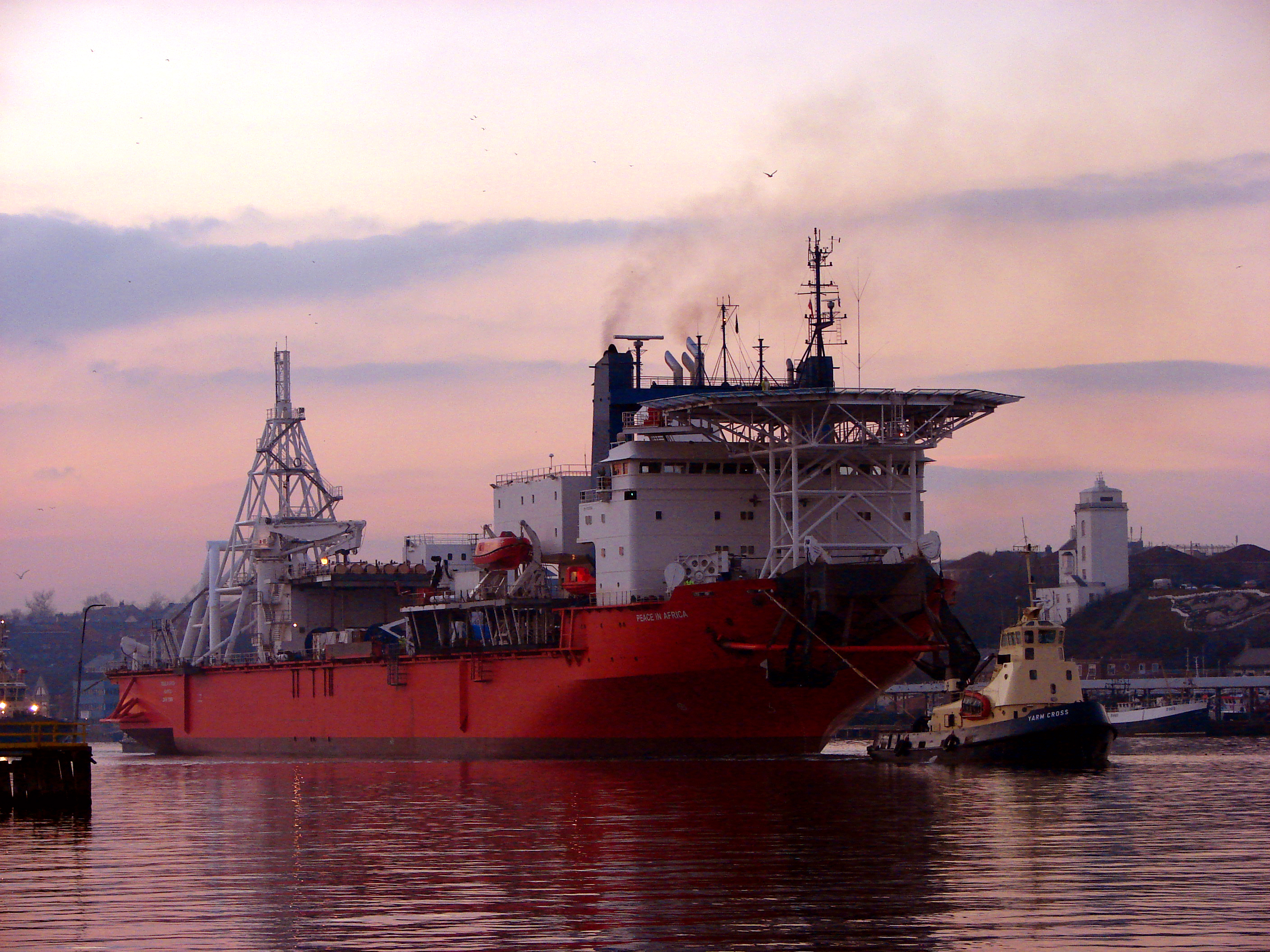
Departing for sea trials near the end of the 2006 refit

As of 2011, Peace in Africa was operating off the coast of Namaqualand in underwater diamond mining. Its ML3 mining license, according to a 2007 report, began about 5 km offshore of Kleinzee, running north to Alexander Bay, Northern Cape, and extended seaward for 17–32 km. Prior to 2007, the ship had operated in the neighboring Atlantic 1 licence area in Namibia, which contained higher-quality diamonds.

The dredging equipment aboard Peace in Africa includes a 240-ton crawler, described as "a large undersea tracked mining tool" connected to the ship by a 655-mm internal diameter rubber hose, and a "diamond recovery treatment plant" built by Bateman Engineering. The dredge has a suction capacity of about 10,000 m^{3} of water and gravel per hour, resulting in about 250 tons of material to be processed for diamonds. The anticipated yield is around 60 diamonds per hour, or roughly 240,000 carats annually.

Peace in Africa was the second-largest ship registered in South Africa, and worked on a continuous, round-the-clock basis, as of 2007. Its mining operation was projected to have a lifespan of 19 years.

As of 2006, De Beers Marine Namibia was operating five mining vessels, including Peace in Africa.

Peace in Africa appeared in a 2009 episode of the Discovery Channel's documentary series Mighty Ships.

In 2013, still under ownership of De Beers Marine Namibia, the vessel was renamed to MV Mafuta.
