= Sause Bros. =

American ocean towing business

Sause Bros., Inc.
- Formerly: Sause Bros. Ocean Towing, Inc.
- Industry: Marine Transportation
- Founded: 1936
- Founders: Henry and Curtis Sause
- Headquarters: Coos Bay, Oregon, U.S.
- Number of locations: Oregon, California, Hawaii
- Area served: Pacific Coast of USA, South Pacific Islands
- Key people: Dale Sause, President
- Services: Hawaii shipping, ocean towing, cargo handling, ship assisting, marine construction and repair services, and oil towing services
- Number of employees: approximately 400
- Website: sause.com

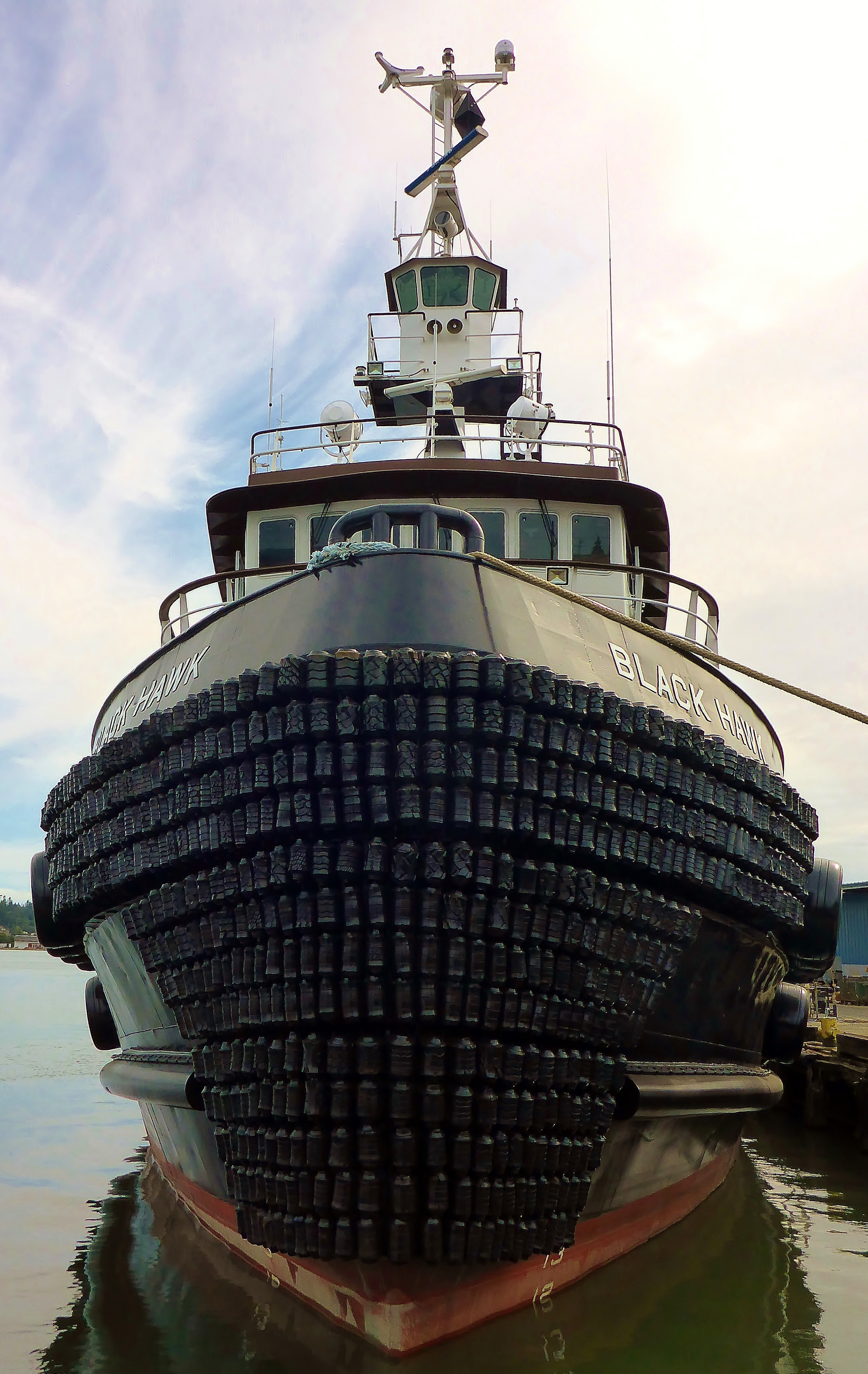
Black Hawk, 2015 renovated Sause Bros. tugboat

Sause Bros., Inc., is an American ocean towing company based in Coos Bay, Oregon. Founded in 1936, it is a privately held company serving routes along the West Coast of the United States, Hawaii and other islands of the South Pacific, as well as Alaska.

The company maintains a sixty-vessel fleet of tugboats and barges, employing approximately 400 people at its facilities in Coos Bay, Portland, and Rainier, Oregon; in Long Beach, California; and in Honolulu and Kalaeloa, Hawaii. The company's Southern Oregon Marine division repairs and maintains the fleet, as well as designing and building new vessels.

Sause Bros.' history includes two fatal accidents and a 1988 oil spill.

== History ==
Sause Bros. was established in 1936 by Henry and Curtis Sause and is currently a fourth-generation family company. According to Maritime Activity Reports, Inc., "Sause is a privately owned family business with a longstanding marine history. It has the most modern fleet of double-hull liquid cargo barges on the U.S. West Coast."

The business began with a single wooden tugboat moving timber rafts along the northwest Pacific coast of the US, from Tillamook Bay north to ports on the Columbia River and Grays Harbor, Washington. By the early 1940s Sause Bros. had added two more tugboats, as well as barges to haul finished lumber products.

The business continued to grow. In 1947, when Henry Sause Jr. became president, general manager and majority shareholder, the company incorporated as Sause Bros. Ocean Towing, and by 1951 the company had added southern routes to transport cargo to Long Beach, California. Fifteen years later, Sause Bros. expanded its barge service to include Hawaii, and extended its delivery services throughout the islands of the South Pacific. By 1976 the company had also ventured into chemical transportation and coastal petroleum transportation.

Sause Bros. opened a shipyard, Southern Oregon Marine (SOMAR), in 1979, east of Coos Bay, Oregon. The SOMAR division of Sause Bros. constructs, modifies, repairs, and maintains the company's fleet of tugs and barges, including line-haul and ship-assist tugs, lumber barges, covered house barges, and double hull liquid cargo barges. During the mid-'70s, Sause Bros. had two single-screw 104 ft (32 m) tugs, the Joseph Sause and the Henry Sause, built in Louisiana. Over the years, SOMAR has lengthened these two tugs, increased the beam, and added new engines and twin screws to gain more working deck space fore and aft. These changes also made possible a larger pilot house, located near the center of the boat.

In 1983 the company incorporated as Sause Bros., Inc., extending cargo delivery throughout the Hawaiian Islands and the South Pacific. The firm has since consolidated its business operations under Sause Bros., Inc. In the mid-1990s the company began cargo handling operations in Long Beach, California, with inner harbor transportation services to oil drilling islands of the harbor.

Sause Bros. changed its base of operations for Hawaii-bound barges in 2002, from Portland to the Port of Longview in Washington, citing proximity to Weyerhauser's dock for loading lumber products, as well as "an excellent working relationship with the ILWU Local 21, with better shipping arrangements." By 2009, Sause Bros. moved across the Columbia to Teevin Terminal in Rainier, Oregon, and consolidated its cargo operations there because of multimodal rail and trucking connections.

== Vessel design and development ==
The Professional Mariner quoted company president Dale Sause's observation: "It isn't any one thing that makes a tug and barge efficient.... It is a total of a lot of small things."

In 1999 the company's SOMAR division built its first tug, Tira Lani, "from the stern up" with azimuth stern drive and a structural steel frame that would support the exhaust pipes and protect the pilot house. The vessel's propulsion system has a service speed of 13 knots (24 kilometers per hour), a bollard pull astern of more than 50 US tons (45.4 T), and a bollard pull ahead of 60 US tons (54.4 T).

A few years after SOMAR built the Tira Lani, the company "embarked on a 20-year vessel-modernization program. The program includes renovating old boats as well as constructing new ones," according to MarineLink.com. In 2003, Sause Bros. ordered replacement engines with low emissions and minimal exhaust smoke for its harbor tug Kamaehu. SOMAR has also been retrofitting the fleet's engines to use ultra-low sulphur fuel to "achieve 80 percent carbon reduction for its Hawaii common carrier service" by the end of 2014.

Professional Mariner reports the company has continued building its fleet considering "a wide range of performance factors." By 2004, Sause Bros. had ordered a series of five new barges from Gunderson Marine, including a 100,000 barrel double-hull oil barge, the largest double-hull vessel ever built by Gunderson. The design processes include the use of computational fluid dynamics to simulate water flow around a vessel's hull at various speeds, identifying fluid dynamics affecting drag and fuel efficiency of barges and tugs. In 2006, Dale Sause tank tested hydralift skegs on a new barge with Josip Gruzling of Nautican Research & Development Ltd. in Sweden.

In 2007, Sause Bros. took delivery on a new tug, Mikonia, that had been constructed at the J.M. Martinac shipyard in Tacoma, Washington. This tug was paired with a new barge, Monterey Bay. According to Professional Mariner, company president Dale Sause claimed much improved fuel efficiency: "Ten years ago we built vessels that made 514 miles per gallon per ton when towing," he said. "But this one will make 1,200 miles per gallon per ton, and the next generation is expected to make 1,500."

The following year, the company introduced Kamakani, a 438 ft (133.5 m) deck cargo barge at SOMAR in Coos Bay. It was characterized as "the result of 10 years of evolution" in the company's bay class barges, 8 ft (2.4 m) longer and 29 ft (9 m) wider than the previous four barges. New technology incorporated a streamlined hull, lateral slats like the wing of an airplane, new hydro-lift foil for steering, and thick, rubbery paint on the barge to weather-seal the Kamakani, doubling the life expectancy to 30 years.

More recently, Sause Bros. took delivery in 2013 on the Columbia, a new barge to serve routes between Hawaii and the mainland. The Columbia is slightly larger than the Kamakani, and is the twenty-first barge in the Sause Bros. fleet. Innovations in design of this barge include a re-shaped bow and hydrofoil skegs, which offer less towing resistance.

== Services ==
The company "transports lumber, plywood, paper, petroleum products, chemicals, bulk commodities, oversized, overweight, or specialty cargoes."

Sause Bros., Inc., provides four types of marine services:

- ocean towing tugs across the Pacific and along the Pacific Coast
- oil transportation
- construction and maintenance of vessels at the company's Southern Oregon Marine shipyard
- heavy cargo transport via deck barges

Coos Aviation is also a division of Sause Bros.

== Safety record ==
Sause Bros., Inc., subscribes to the International Safety Management Code, and has developed its own internal Safety Management System. However, the company's early history does include some fatal incidents and an oil spill in 1988.

On January 7, 1951, William Sause and three other men entered the cab of a heavy crane aboard a barge on the Skipanon River, a tributary of the Columbia near Astoria, Oregon. When they started the crane's engine, the engine vibrations sent the crane toppling backwards into the water. One man, John Gibson, jumped clear. Sause and Harold Holmes were knocked unconscious and then were rescued by Gibson; the fourth man, Charles Sanderson, was trapped in the cab and drowned at the bottom of the river.

A second fatal incident occurred November 1, 1958, when Henry Sause, Jr., then the company's president, and two other men went out in a motor launch to take soundings on a sand bar in the Siletz River. The launch capsized in heavy seas while they were seeking a route to get the stranded tug Columbia out to sea. Henry Sause managed to swim to shore, but the other two, Mel Jorgenson and Ralph Hunt, were drowned.

An oil spill off Gray's Harbor occurred in 1988 when the tow wire from the Sause Bros. tug Ocean Service parted in heavy seas. The tug struck the barge Nestucca while trying to put a line up, opening a nearly 4 ft (1.2 m) gash below the waterline. The early leak estimate was 70,000 US gal (264 m^{3}), but in the final analysis, the loss was determined to be more than 200,000 US gal (757 m^{3}), affecting marine environments from California to British Columbia.
