= Pardee Butler =

- Butler's formal portrait
- Born: March 9, 1816; Onondaga County, New York
- Died: October 20, 1888 (aged 72); Farmington, Kansas
- Occupations: Abolitionist, farmer, preacher
- Political party: Republican

Pardee Butler (March 9, 1816 in Onondaga County, New York – October 20, 1888 in Farmington, Atchison County, Kansas) was a farmer and Restoration Movement preacher who arrived in Kansas in 1855 and was involved there in the run-up to the American Civil War. He is remembered in Kansas history for being set adrift on the Missouri River on a raft by pro-slavery men for his abolitionist beliefs.

Butler was among the early organizers of the Republican Party in Kansas.

== Early life ==
Pardee Butler's ancestors were from New England. His parents are Phineas Butler and Sarah Pardee. Pardee was born in 1816. In 1818 the family moved west to Wadsworth, Medina County, Ohio in the Western Reserve. In 1839 the family moved to the Sandusky Plains in northwestern Ohio where Pardee met his future wife Sibjl [sic] Carleton. They were married August 17, 1843. Pardee farmed for a living and preached for his beliefs. He developed quinsy (an abscess of the tonsils) that caused him to give up preaching and move to Cedar County, Iowa in 1850 to improve his health. Over the next several years he preached in various places in Illinois and Missouri and in early 1855 came to Kansas.

== Famous episodes ==
Kansas in the 1850s was a territory with strong sentiment on both sides of the slavery issue. Butler obtained a claim to 160 acres (0.65 km^{2}) of land, twelve miles (19 km) from Atchison, on the banks of the Stranger Creek. His great-great-grandson farms the land to this day. In June, Butler preached the first sermon in Kansas by a Christian minister.

By the middle of August Butler had built a cabin and stopped in Atchison on his way back to Illinois to fetch his family. It was there that the rafting episode took place on August 18, 1855. In addition to Butler's first-hand account of the episode in his Recollections, Cutler's History of the State of Kansas discusses the episode in his chapter on the border ruffian warfare.

While in Atchison Butler went to the offices of the Squatter Sovereign to get some extra copies to show his friends in Illinois. Butler was waited on by Robert S. Kelley and took the opportunity to announce his free-state views. Kelley organized a meeting that night and the next day Kelley and his cohorts accosted Butler and demanded he sign a string of resolutions denouncing free State men. He refused. A large crowd gathered. Matters were debated. Eventually ...

a vote was taken upon the mode of punishment which ought to be accorded to him [Butler], and to this day it is probably known but to few persons that a decided verdict of death by hanging was rendered; and furthermore, that Mr. Kelley, the teller, by making false returns to the excited mob, save Mr. Butler's life ... the pro-slavery party decided to send Mr. Butler down the Missouri River on a raft.

A picture of the flag that flew on the raft on which Pardee Butler was set adrift. The flag remained in the family and was donated by his son Charles Pardee Butler to the Kansas State Historical Society in 1927 and is on display in the Kansas Museum of History. The text "Greeley to the Rescue" is a reference to Horace Greeley, the New York Tribune anti-slavery editor.

A raft was constructed of two logs, a flag placed on the end of the raft, Butler ordered to take his place on the raft, and the whole was towed by a skiff to the middle of the Missouri river and set adrift. As the raft departed the bank Butler declaimed:

Gentlemen, if I am drowned [he could not swim] I forgive you; but I have this to say to you: If you are not ashamed of your part in this transaction, I am not ashamed of mine. Good-by.

Butler cut off the flag and using the flag staff as a paddle made his way to the Kansas shore. The rafting episode was widely publicized and made clear that "... the country was full of men that were ready to fight."

The following spring on April 30, 1856 Butler passed through Atchison on his way back to his homestead from more preaching in Illinois. He was spotted by Kelley and was again soon the target of an angry mob who wanted to shoot or hang him. After much discussion a punishment of tarring and feathering substituted. Butler's account of this episode appeared in several papers of the times.

The passions of which Butler was a victim continued to ferment in Kansas and the rest of the country and soon led to the Civil War.

== Later life ==
After the Civil War, Butler continued to preach and farm and turned from the abolitionist movement to the temperance movement. He spent much time writing and lecturing on temperance, both before and after the passage of a Prohibitory Amendment to the Kansas state constitution. The Atchison Daily Globe of the 1880s contains several of his polemics.

On September 19, 1888, as Butler was dismounting a colt that refused to be bridled he was kicked in the right foot crushing the ankle. The family feared no worse than a crippled ankle. The first week was hopeful. The second week he was delirious. He soon fell into an unconscious stuper and died on October 19 at the age of seventy-two.

== Politics ==
The Republican Party was begun in the early 1850s by anti-slavery activists. Pardee Butler was one of the organizers of the Republican Party in Kansas in May and June 1856. In 1856 the Republicans became a national party when John C. Fremont was nominated for President. In 1860 Abraham Lincoln became the first Republican president.

There is a family story about Pardee Butler and Abraham Lincoln that is related by Heywood Broun in one of his It Seems to Me columns that appeared in the New York Graphic in March 1936.

The Rev. Pardee Butler was a mighty man in debate and a most skillful propagandist. He wrote the free soil constitution for the State of Kansas, and in the eyes of some historians he is identified as the actual founder of the Republican party. ... His family treasures an anecdote of his return home after an oratorical foray.

"Were there any other speakers?" asked his wife.

"Other speakers!" snorted the Rev. Pardee Butler, who was accustomed to open and close meetings himself. But then he was reminded of an incident. "Oh, yes," he said, "when I got done we heard a few words from a young Springfield lawyer named Lincoln."

Butler was active in the presidential campaign of 1872 speaking at the Republican State Congressional Convention at Lawrence and serving as an elector.

Though often urged by his friends to run for office, Butler invariably refused telling them "...he considered the office of a Christian preacher the highest office on earth."
