= Silicon Forest =

Nickname for the cluster of high-tech companies near Portland, USA

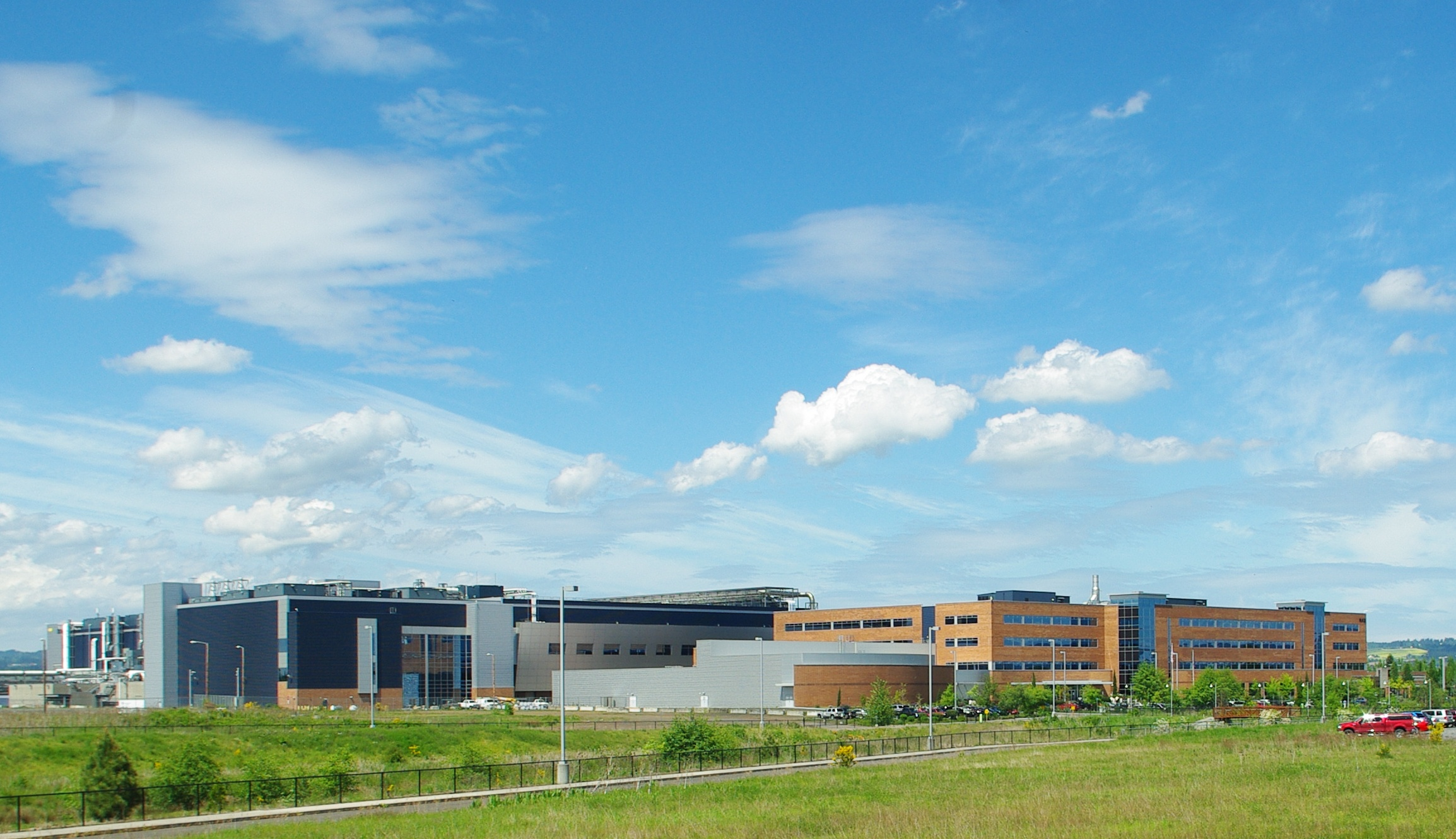
Intel's Ronler Acres campus in Hillsboro, Oregon

Silicon Forest is a Washington County cluster of high-tech companies located in the Portland metropolitan area in the U.S. state of Oregon. The term most frequently refers to the industrial corridor between Beaverton and Hillsboro in northwest Oregon. The high-technology industry accounted for 19 percent of Oregon's economy in 2005, and the Silicon Forest name has been applied to the industry throughout the state in such places as Corvallis, Bend, and White City. Nevertheless, the name refers primarily to the Portland metropolitan area, where about 1,500 high-tech firms were located as of 2006.

The name is analogous to Silicon Valley. In the greater Portland area, these companies have traditionally specialized in hardware — specifically test-and-measurement equipment (Tektronix), computer chips (Intel and an array of smaller chip manufacturers), electronic displays (InFocus, Planar Systems and Pixelworks) and printers (Hewlett-Packard Co, Xerox and Epson). There is a small clean technology emphasis in the area.

== History ==
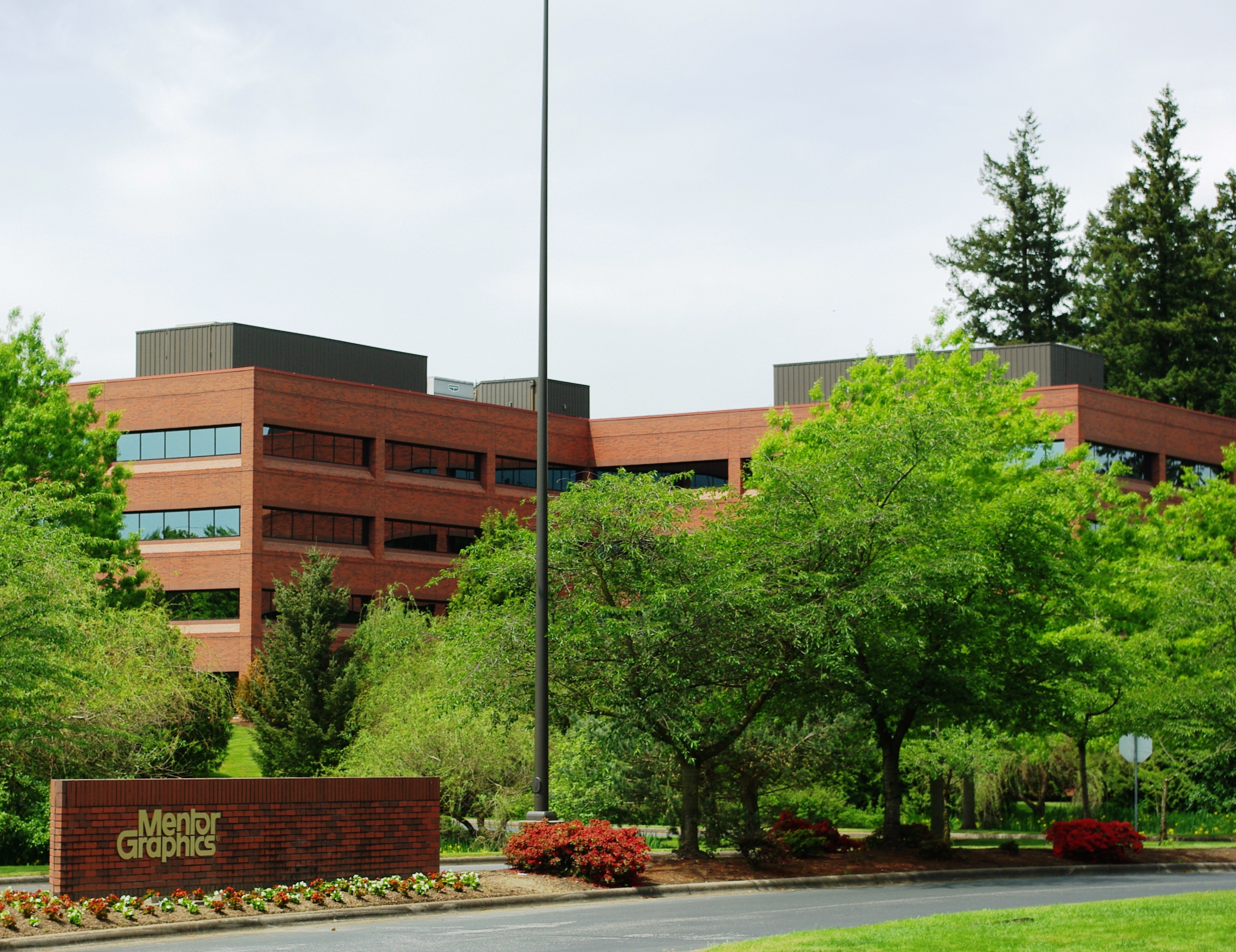
Mentor (a Siemens business) headquarters in Wilsonville

Silicon Forest can refer to all the technology companies in Oregon, but initially referred to Washington County on Portland’s west side. First used in a Japanese company’s press release dating to 1981, Lattice Semiconductor trademarked the term in 1984 but does not use the term in its marketing materials. Lattice’s founder is sometimes mentioned as the person who came up with the term.

The high-tech industry in the Portland area dates back to at least the 1940s, with Tektronix and Electro Scientific Industries as pioneers. Tektronix and ESI both started out in Portland proper, but moved to Washington County in 1951 and 1962, respectively, and developed sites designed to attract other high-tech companies. Floating Point Systems, co-founded by three former Tektronix employees in Beaverton in 1970, was the first spin-off company in Silicon Forest and the third (after Tek and ESI) to be traded on the NYSE. These three companies, and later Intel, led to the creation of a number of other spin-offs and startups, some of which were remarkably successful. A 2003 dissertation on these spin-offs led to a poster depicting the genealogy of 894 Silicon Forest companies. High-tech employment in the state reached a peak of almost 73,000 in 2001, but has never recovered from the dot-com bust. Statewide, tech employment totaled 57,000 in the spring of 2012.

Unlike other regions with a "silicon" appellation, semiconductors truly are the heart of Oregon's tech industry.

The Oregon Graduate Institute was founded by Tektronix and the Tektronix Foundation in 1963 to provide education and training for employees in the high technology industry.

Intel's headquarters remain in Santa Clara, California, but in the 1990s the company began moving its most advanced technical operations to Oregon. Its Ronler Acres campus eventually became its most advanced anywhere, and Oregon is now Intel's largest operating hub. In late 2012, Intel had close to 17,000 employees in Oregon—more than anywhere else the company operated; by 2022, the number had grown to about 22,000.

== Companies and subsidiaries ==
The following is a sample of past and present notable companies in the Silicon Forest. They may have been founded in the Silicon Forest or have a major subsidiary there. A list of Portland tech startups (technology companies founded in Portland) is provided separately.

=== Current ===
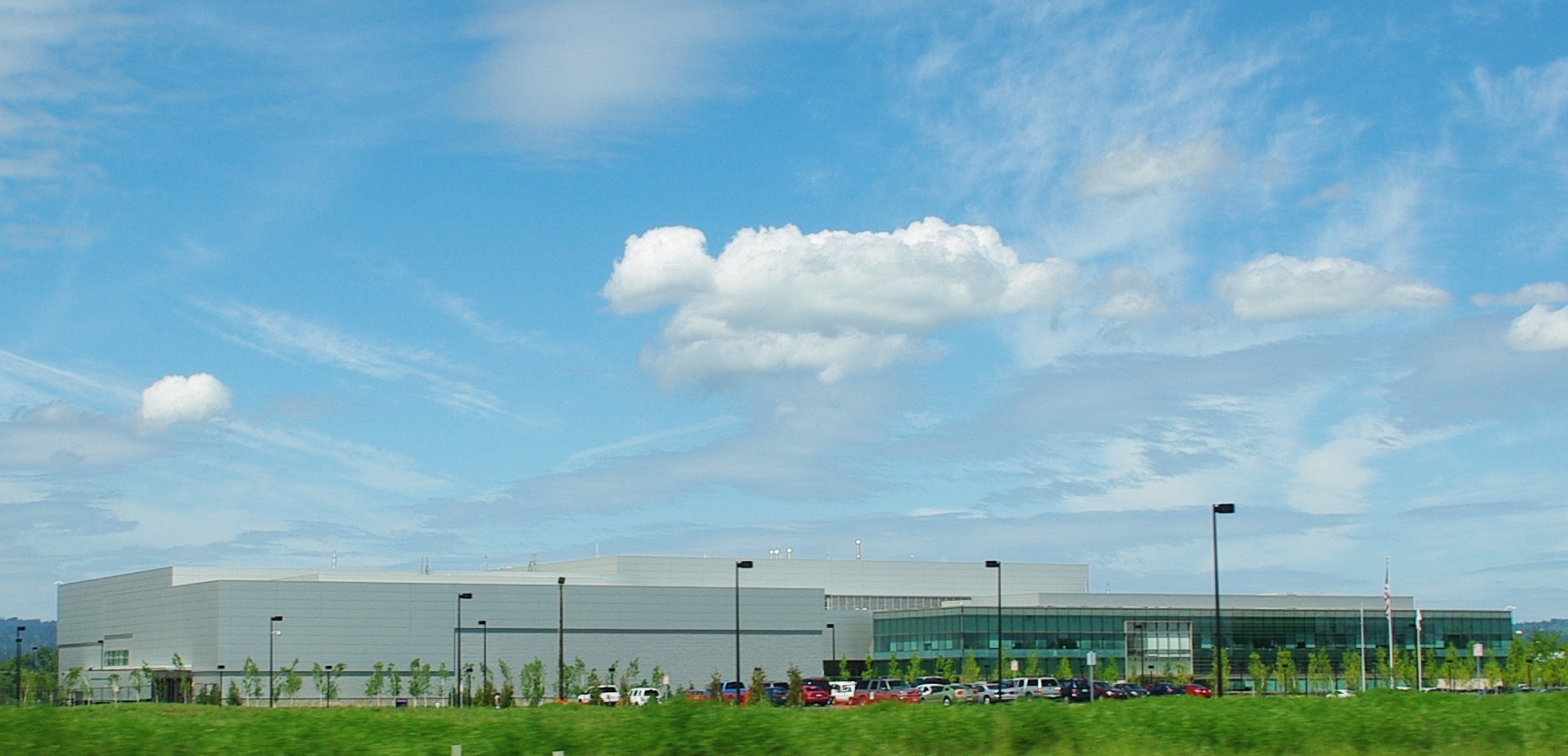
Genentech facility in Hillsboro

- ACM Research
- Act-On
- Adtran (after acquired a startup named ”SmartRG”)
- Aistock
- Airbnb
- Amazon Web Services (via acquisition of Elemental Technologies)
- Ambric (acquired by Nethra Imaging in April 2009)
- Analog Devices
- Apple Inc. (software engineering in Vancouver, WA. This was previously the Claris products group) and a new R&D facility around Hillsboro.
- Arris Group (via acquisition of C-COR)
- ASML
- Atos
- Autodesk Inc
- Biotronik
- Brandlive
- Block-CashApp
- Cambia Health Solutions (HealthSparq, Hubbub, and SpendWell)
- Cascade Microtech
- CD Baby
- CollegeNET
- Consumer Cellular
- DAT Solutions
- Digimarc
- eBay
- Electro Scientific Industries
- EPSON
- Expensify
- Extensis
- Thermo Fisher Scientific (via acquisition of FEI Company)
- FLIR Systems
- ForgeRock
- GemStone Systems
- Genentech
- Google
- Grass Valley
- Hewlett-Packard
- IBM (by acquisition of Sequent)
- InFocus
- Intel
- Integra Telecom
- IP Fabrics
- IXIA
- Jaguar Land Rover
- Janrain
- Kryptiq Corporation
- Kyocera
- LaCie
- Laika
- Lam Research (through merging with Novellus Systems)
- Lattice Semiconductor
- Lightspeed Systems
- Linear Technology
- Logitech
- Maxim Integrated Products
- McAfee
- Mentor Graphics
- Microchip Technology (purchased Fujitsu old facility)
- Microsoft, especially for hardware engineering design center
- New Relic (engineering headquarters)
- Nike, Inc. (Consumer Digital Division)
- Nvidia Corporation
- NuScale Power
- OpenSesame Inc
- ON Semiconductor
- Oracle Corporation (by acquisition of Sun Microsystems)
- Oregon Scientific
- Panic Software
- PacStar
- Phoseon Technology
- Pivotal Labs
- Pixelworks
- Planar Systems
- Pop Art, Inc.
- Puppet
- Qorvo
- RadiSys Corporation
- Razorfish
- Rentrak
- RFPIO
- Rivos
- Rohde & Schwarz
- Rockwell Collins
- Sage Software (by the acquisition of Timberline)
- Salesforce.com
- Sensory, Inc.
- SEH America
- Sharp Corporation
- Silicon Labs
- Siltronic
- Simple
- Shimadzu Corp.
- Skyworks (by the acquisition of Avnera)
- Smarsh
- Sellgo
- SurveyMonkey
- Squarespace
- Synopsys
- Tektronix
- Tripwire
- Urban Airship
- Vacasa
- Vape-Jet
- VeriWave
- Vernier Software & Technology
- Vevo
- Wacker Siltronic, subsidiary of Wacker Chemie, manufacturer of silicon wafers
- Wacom (North American headquarters are based in Vancouver, Washington)
- WaferTech (TSMC subsidiary)
- Webtrends
- WebMD
- Welch Allyn
- Workday, Inc
- Xerox
- ZoomInfo

=== Former ===
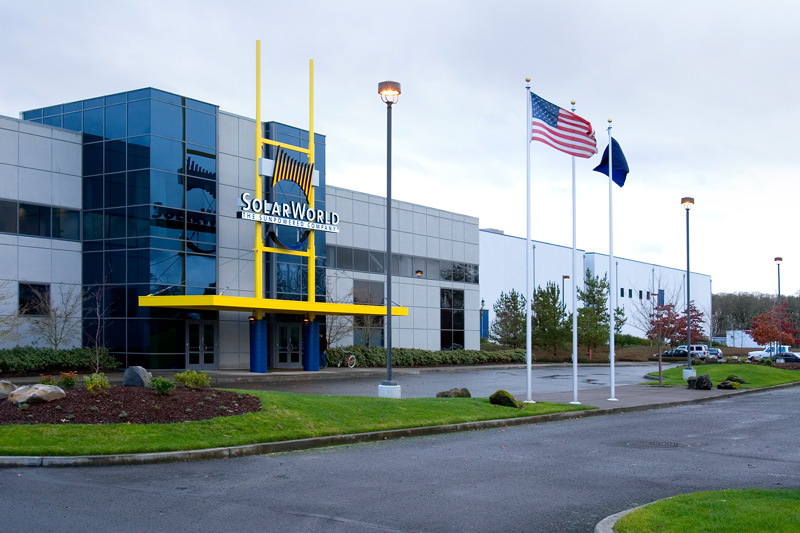
Former SolarWorld US headquarters in Hillsboro, which closed in 2017 and was later used by SunPower, until 2021

- BiiN (defunct)
- Central Point Software (defunct)
- ClearEdge Power
- Etec Systems (acquired by Applied Materials)
- Floating Point Systems (defunct)
- Fujitsu (factory closed, sold to Microchip Technology)
- Jive Software (acquired & closed)
- MathStar (defunct)
- Merix Corporation (acquired by Viasystems)
- Microsoft's Surface Hub R&D (closed down)
- nCUBE. Beaverton HQ was established in 1983. Acquired by C-COR in 2005, which was in turn acquired by ARRIS in 2007. CommScope acquired ARRIS in 2019, and closed the Beaverton office in the aftermath of the COVID-19 pandemic.
- NEC (factory closed)
- Open Source Development Labs (defunct)
- Oregon Graduate Institute (merged with OHSU in 2001; Washington County campus closed in 2014)
- Sequent Computer Systems (purchased by IBM in 1993) Sequent, founded by a team that included three Intel VPs and 15 other employees, also mostly from Intel, made a major contribution to multiprocessing and was largely responsible for the demise of large minicomputers, which could be replaced by much smaller and cheaper micro-processor-based multiprocessor systems. It went public in 1987 and was beginning to also encroach on the market for large mainframe transaction processing systems when IBM bought it out.
- SolarWorld
- SunPower (in former SolarWorld facility)
- Mozilla (Mozilla closed Portland office in 2023 due to shifting remote work policies)

== See also ==
- List of places with "Silicon" names
