= Oregon Venture Fund =

Venture capital fund

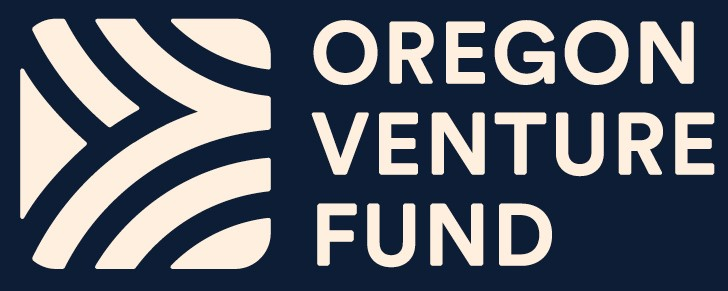
- Formerly: Oregon Angel Fund
- Type: Private Ownership
- Industry: Venture capital
- Founded: 2007; 19 years ago
- Founders: Eric Rosenfeld; Robert Ward
- Headquarters: Portland, Oregon, U.S.
- Products: Venture capital
- Total assets: $185 million
- Number of employees: 8
- Website: oregonventurefund.com

Oregon Venture Fund makes venture investments in the Portland, Oregon area and throughout Oregon and SW Washington. Founded in 2007 as the Oregon Angel Fund and renamed in 2018, the fund consists of 180 institutional and angel investors, of whom 85% have run or founded a business. As of 2014, the fund evaluated up to 300 business plans per year, selecting five to seven to invest in annually.

== History ==
=== 2007-2017: Oregon Angel Fund ===
The fund was originally called the Oregon Angel Fund, and was active as of 2008. It formed out of the 2007 Angel Oregon hosted by the Oregon Entrepreneurs Network, with its first fund raising $900,000 from 36 investors. The first company that the fund invested in was Lumencor, a technology startup in Beaverton.

In 2014, it raised $6.6 million for its annual fund, after aiming for $6 million. It was led by managing partner Eric Rosenfeld.

In 2017, it invested $7 million into seven companies, while its individual investors put another $6.8 million into companies as well. It raised an annual fund from an investment group of 180 investors. It had overall invested $48 million in 56 startups, all located in either Southwest Washington or Oregon.

=== 2018-2025: Oregon Venture Fund ===
In 2018, the fund changed its name from Oregon Angel Fund to Oregon Venture Fund and launched a new $30 million fund. It was the firm's first five-year institutional funds; prior funds had been limited to one year.

Since its inception, Oregon Venture Fund had by 2021 generated an average annual rate of return of 34% and a return on investment exceeding $3.50 for each dollar invested. In 2021, it managed $250 million in investments.

== Investment strategy ==
In 2015, about 70 percent of the fund's investments were in technology. 20 percent are medical devices, health care IT, and related fields. And 10 percent were in other areas such as transportation, advanced materials, and consumer. 31% of portfolio companies were founded by, or are headed by, a woman and 23% by a person of color.

Some 70 companies in Oregon Venture Fund's portfolio include Absci, Jama, Elemental Technologies, Brandlive, Salt & Straw, and Wildfang.

The Oregon Venture Fund also receives investment from The Oregon Community Foundation, Meyer Memorial Trust, the State of Oregon, and regional colleges and universities, such as University of Oregon, Willamette University, Portland State University, and Lewis & Clark College.

== Investments and exits ==
Oregon Venture Fund notable investments and exits include:

- Absci (Nasdaq IPO)
- Bigleaf Networks
- Brandlive
- Bright.MD (acquired by Cigna)
- ClearAccess (acquired by Cisco Systems)
- Cloud Campaign
- CrowdCompass (acquired by Cvent)
- Customer.io
- Digs
- Eclypsium
- Elemental Technologies (acquired by Amazon Web Services for $500 million)
- Gear Up
- Giftango (acquired by InComm)
- GlobeSherpa (acquired by Daimler AG)
- Gutsy
- Honey Mama's
- Hubb (acquired by Intrado)
- Hydrolix
- Inpria (acquired by JSR Corp. for $514 million)
- IOTAS (acquired by ADT)
- Jama Software (invested in 2008, acquired by Francisco Partners for $1.2 billion )
- Kivo
- Little Bird (acquired by Sprinklr)
- Lumen Learning
- Lumencor
- Meridian (acquired by Aruba for $26 million)
- NLM Photonics
- Opal
- Pacific Light Technologies (acquired by Osram)
- Poached Jobs
- Qualtik
- Rigado
- RISE Brewing
- Rumpl
- Salt & Straw
- Second Porch (acquired by HomeAway)
- Sila
- SmartRG (acquired by AdTran)
- Source
- Streem (acquired by Frontdoor)
- The Clymb (acquired by LeftLane Sports)
- The Wild (acquired by Autodesk)
- TrovaTrip
- UpSight Security
- Wayfinder
- Wicked Saints
- Wildfang

== Management ==
Co-founded by Robert Ward and Eric Rosenfeld, in 2014 the fund was managed by Eric Rosenfeld, Alline Akintore, Deepthi Madhava, Melissa Freeman, Jon Maroney, Matt Compton, Lynn Fletcher, and Mary Geyer.
