= Electro Scientific Industries =

American technology company

Electro Scientific Industries, Inc.

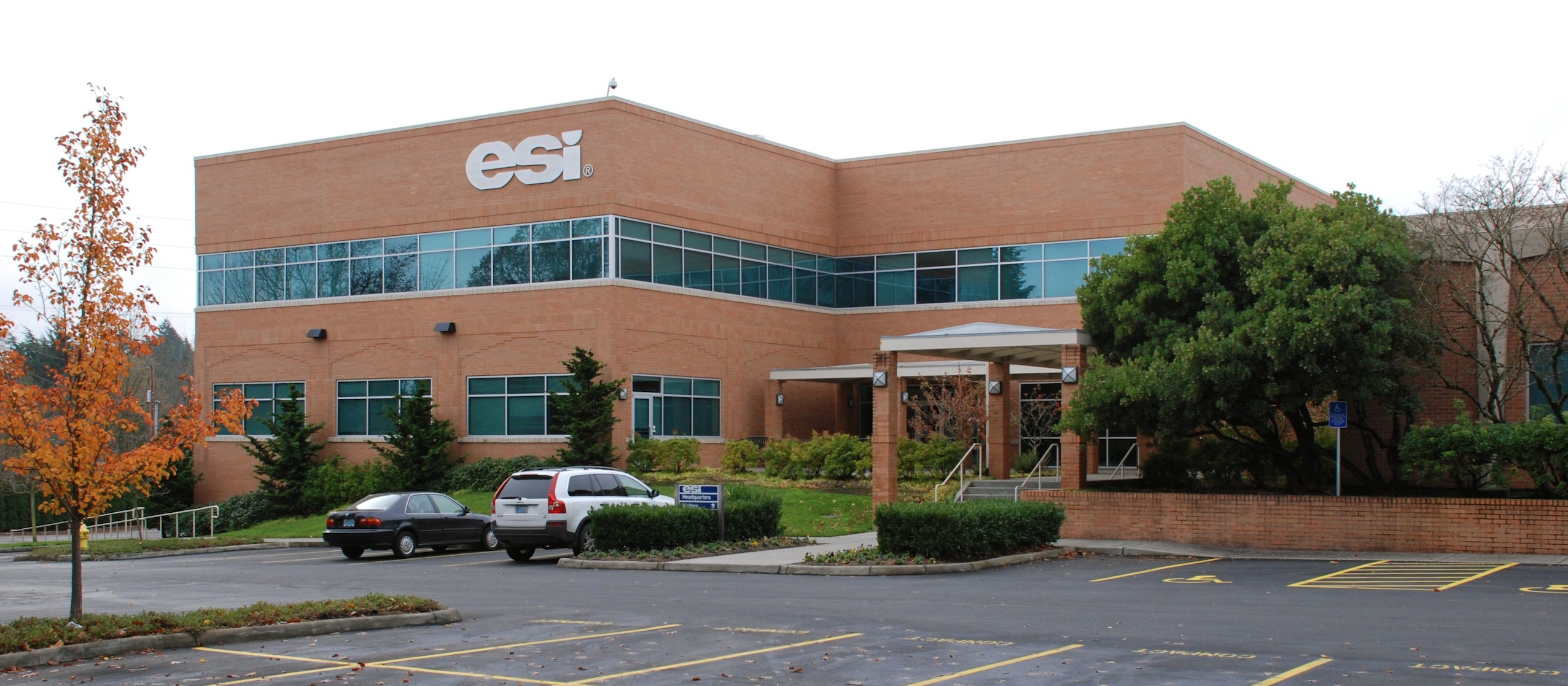
- Building 4 of ESI's former headquarters campus in Cedar Mill in 2009, before acquisition by MKS
- Company type: Subsidiary
- Industry: Electronics, semiconductor, Laser, Machining
- Founded: 1944; 82 years ago (alternatively 1953)
- Founder: Douglas C. Strain (1953)
- Headquarters: Beaverton, Oregon; United States; 45.49572°N 122.82545°W
- Area served: Worldwide
- Key people: Michael Burger (president and CEO); Allen Muhich (CFO); Michael Stubelt (VP Business Development); John Williams (VP Marketing)
- Products: Laser-based processing systems for printed circuit board (PCB) manufacturing, IC packaging fabrication, passive component manufacturing, testing, and inspection, semiconductor wafer processing and component parts micromachining;
- Revenue: US$159.1 million (FY 2015)
- Parent: MKS Instruments
- Website: esi.com

Electro Scientific Industries, Inc. (ESI) is an American high technology company headquartered in the Portland, Oregon, metropolitan area, specifically in Beaverton, Oregon, since 2021, but from 1963–2021, it was based in the unincorporated Cedar Mill area just north of Beaverton. ESI is a developer and supplier of photonic and laser systems for microelectronics manufacturers. Founded in 1944, it is the oldest high-tech company in Oregon. Along with Tektronix, and later Intel, it has spawned numerous technology-based companies in the Portland area, an area known as the Silicon Forest. From 1983 to 2019, shares in the company were publicly traded on NASDAQ, under the ticker symbol ESIO.

In October 2018, it was announced that a deal had been reached to sell the company to MKS Instruments, Inc. The deal was completed on February 1, 2019, making ESI a subsidiary of MKS.

== History ==
ESI was founded in 1944 as Brown Engineering, later becoming Brown Electro-Measurement Corporation (BECO). In 1953, BECO's Douglas C. Strain and three other investors bought out Strain's partners at Brown and formed a new company, Electro-Measurements Inc., which used the brand name "ESI" in marketing. The acronym stood for "excellent scientific instruments", but the company's name remained Electro Measurements Inc. until 1959, when it was changed to "ESI, Inc." and finally in 1960 to Electro Scientific Industries, Inc. (ESI). Prior to about 2000, the company was usually referred to as having been founded in 1953. Douglas Strain was the company's CEO and board chairman from 1953 until 1980, and remained on the board (continuing as chairman until 1985, then vice chairman) until fully retiring in 1999.

In the 1950s, the company's specialty was the manufacture of high-precision resistance measuring instruments and related products. In 1970, ESI began developing laser trimming systems for resistor circuits, and soon became a leader in this field.

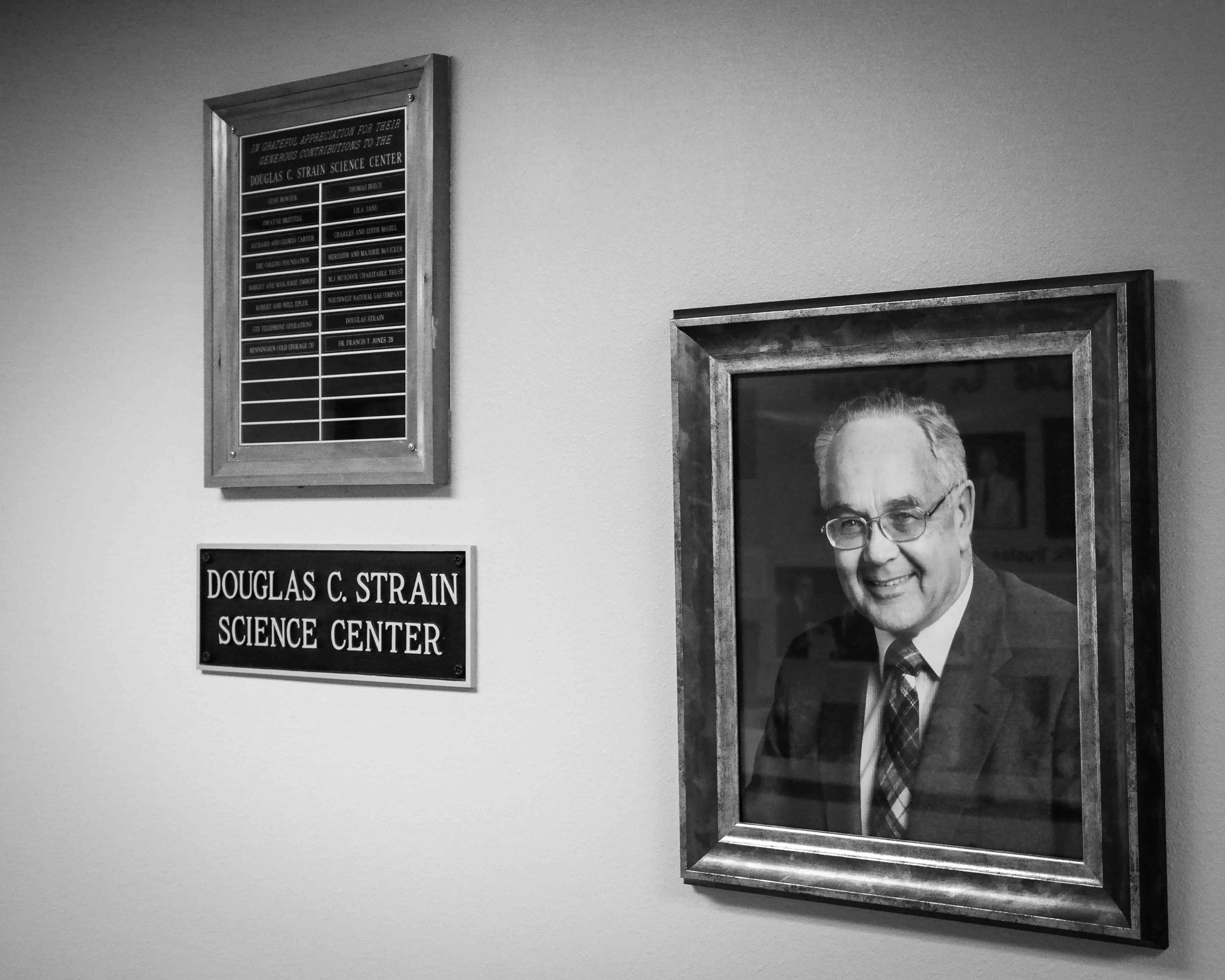
Framed photograph of Douglas C. Strain, on the wall of the science center named after him at Pacific University

All facilities were located at S.E. 43rd & Stark in Portland until 1956, when the first stage of a new headquarters and manufacturing plant on Macadam Avenue, in South Portland, was opened. The new plant was destroyed by fire in 1957, and had to be rebuilt. In 1962, ESI announced plans to create a new development called "Sunset Science Park", to be built in the Cedar Mill area of unincorporated Washington County, Oregon, designed to attract other technology companies, with ESI as an anchor. The company moved its headquarters to the Sunset Science Park location in 1963, and the manufacturing facilities followed in 1966, vacating the Macadam Avenue site. The complex on N.W. Science Park Drive, which remained ESI's headquarters until 2021, had a Portland mailing address, but was not in the city of Portland proper; it occupied unincorporated land which is now adjacent to the city limits of Beaverton.

ESI became a publicly traded company in 1983. It traded on the NASDAQ stock exchange under the ticker symbol ESIO.

The company opened its first foreign sales office in 1978, in Munich, Germany, and later opened offices in several countries in Southeast Asia. As of 2007, the company also had offices for direct sales in several European countries, as well.

Several small companies were acquired by ESI in the late 1990s, including Dynamotion Corp. (of California) in 1997, Chip Star Inc. (California) in 1997, Applied Intelligent Systems Inc. (AISI) (Michigan) in 1997, and Testec Corp. (Arizona) in 1999.

A new manufacturing facility was opened in Klamath Falls, Oregon, in early 2001. The company acquired California-based New Wave Research Inc. in 2007. At the beginning of 2009, Electro Scientific had around 700 employees, about half of whom were located in Oregon. Edward C. Grady was named as the president and CEO of ESI in February 2014.

The company acquired fiber laser manufacturer Eolite Systems in June 2012, the semiconductor systems business from GSI Group in May 2013, and Chinese laser firm Wuhan Topwin Optoelectronics Technology Co. in January 2015.

In August 2016, the company announced that Michael Burger, formerly CEO of Cascade Microtech, would succeed Edward Grady as CEO effective October 3, 2016.

=== Annexation fight ===
In 2005, ESI joined Columbia Sportswear, Tektronix and other Washington County companies in an effort led by Nike to convince the state legislature to prohibit the practice of forcible annexation of "islands" of unincorporated land that have become surrounded by a city. The Nike effort stemmed from an aggressive annexation policy being practiced by the city of Beaverton in 2004, under which the city had added more than 500 acres (2.0 km^{2}) of unincorporated land, including the headquarters of Leupold & Stevens (located almost adjacent to ESI, but on the opposite side of the Sunset Highway freeway). Although the then-headquarters sites of ESI and Columbia are not on "islands" surrounded by Beaverton, both directly abut the city boundary, and company officials were concerned about the likely eventual effect of the city's annexation practices should future annexations cause their properties to become part of such an island. The 2005 Oregon Legislature enacted a law prohibiting Beaverton from any forced island-type annexations for two years and additionally included language effectively banning Beaverton from forcibly annexing any of Electro Scientific Industries' property—whether an island or not—for at least 30 years.

== Sale of company to MKS ==
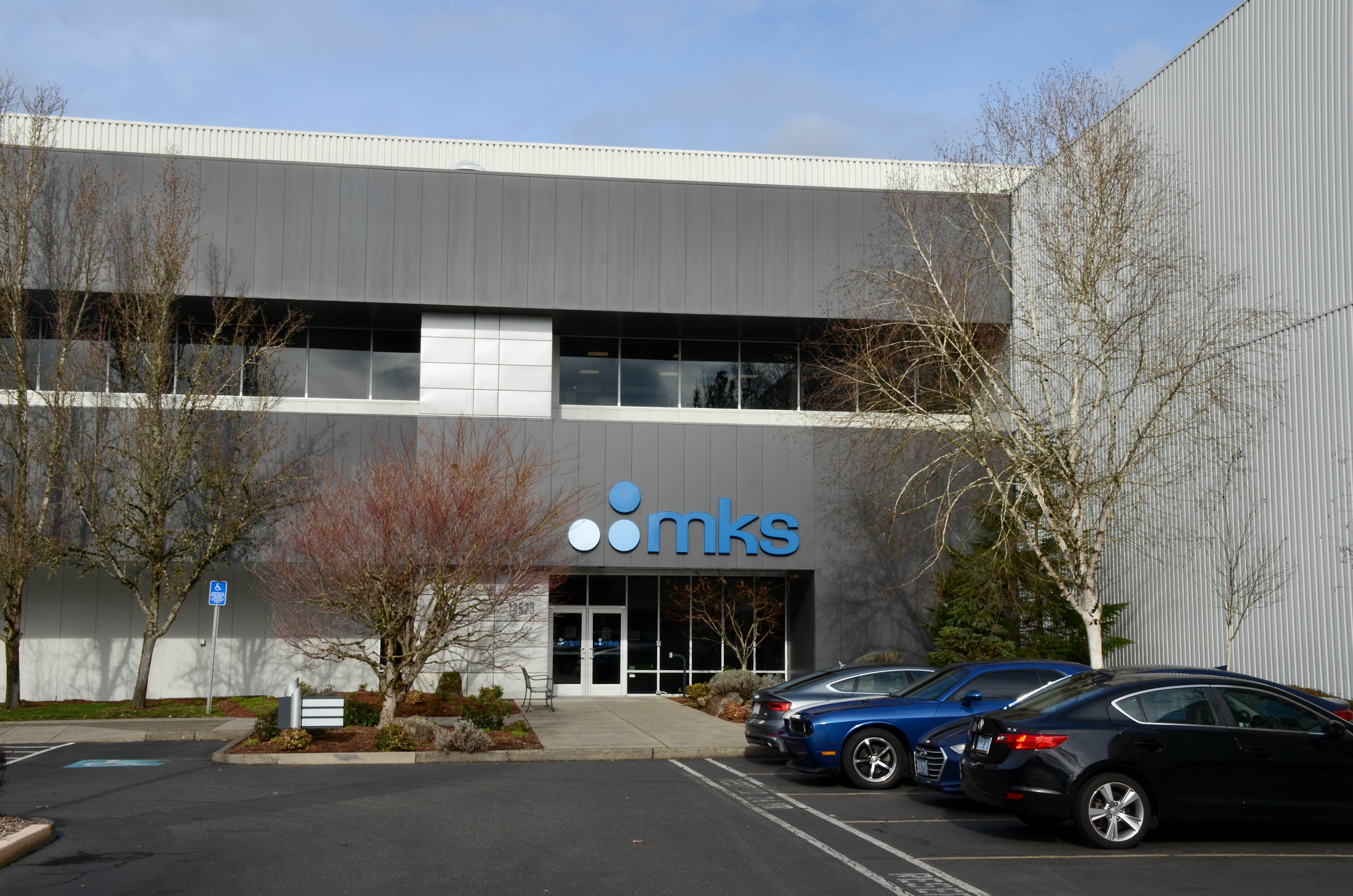
ESI's Beaverton headquarters as a subsidiary of MKS Instruments (2022)

In October 2018, it was announced that a deal had been reached to sell the company to MKS Instruments, Inc., based in Andover, Massachusetts, for a price of approximately $1 billion in cash. On January 1, 2019, ESI stockholders approved the deal, also referred to as a merger, and the company announced that its stock would cease trading upon the closing of the transaction, which was achieved on February 1, 2019.

Later in 2019, MKS sold ESI's Science Park Drive buildings to Columbia Sportswear, whose headquarters is located nearby, with its employees store directly adjacent to ESI. At the time, MKS had not yet chosen a new location for ESI but was looking for a suitable, but smaller, space in Beaverton. In early 2021, MKS was continuing to identify the Science Park Drive site as ESI's address, but by July 2021, the address had been changed to one in the city of Beaverton proper, on S.W. Millikan Way.

== Operations ==
ESI manufactures a variety of laser-based processing and micro-manufacturing solutions designed to help manufacturers optimize their production capabilities by moving beyond the limitations of mechanical-based solutions. These include laser-based via drilling systems for printed circuit board (PCB) manufacturers and integrated circuit packaging fabricators. ESI systems also address the needs of passive component manufacturing/testing/inspection with wafer trim and circuit trim offerings. Semiconductor manufacturers use ESI systems for processing wafers. Manufacturers use ESI’s laser-based micro-machining platforms for component part manufacturing and marking.

ESI’s manufacturing facilities are distributed across the US and Asia, from the headquarters campus in Portland, to Klamath Falls, Oregon, Fremont, California, Bozeman, Montana and Singapore. In Asia, the primary operation hub is located in Shanghai.

The company, which traded on NASDAQ until early 2019, had annual revenues of $159.1 million for fiscal year 2015.

== Products ==
ESI’s interconnect and micro-fabrication products are used to create nano-scale features on a variety of materials and substrates in high-volume manufacturing. The company’s semiconductor products include automated ultra-thin wafer dicing and high-throughput, high-accuracy grooving systems. In the area of component test and inspection, ESI offers automated test, termination, high-speed handling and visual inspection equipment for manufacturing of miniature multilayer ceramic passive components and other components, such as arrays, inductors and varistors. It also manufactures fiber, rod and solid state lasers and ablation lasers for use in laser manufacturing systems.

== See also ==
- List of companies based in Oregon
