= XXIA =

XXIA may refer to:

- XXIA, the Nasdaq code for Ixia, a defunct American public computer networking company
- Xi'an Xianyang International Airport, the main airport serving Xi'an, Shaanxi Province, China
