= Revant Optics =

American online retailer

- Type: Private
- Industry: Eyewear
- Founded: 2010; 16 years ago in Portland, Oregon, U.S.
- Founders: Jason Bolt
- Headquarters: Portland, Oregon, United States
- Website: www.revantoptics.com

Revant Optics is an American online retailer that designs, develops, and sells replacement lenses for sunglasses and prescription glasses, based in Portland, Oregon.

== History ==
The company was founded in 2010 in Portland, Oregon by Jason Bolt. It was included as one of the fastest-growing companies in the United States by Inc. (magazine) in 2014, 2015, and 2016. In 2017, Revant started manufacturing lenses in Portland, Oregon and received the Portland Business Journal Oregon Manufacturer of the Year Award (11-50 employees). In 2019, Revant was awarded the nationally recognized Bronze Stevie Award for Customer Service Department of the Year. In 2019, founder and CEO Jason Bolt won the Oregon Entrepreneurs Network Entrepreneurial Achievement Award that recognizes an entrepreneur or founding team with a record of outstanding achievement within the past 18 months. In 2024, Revant was awarded an Oregon Manufacturer of the Year Award from Portland Business Journal as well as a European Design Award for ECO DESIGN/Sustainable: Outdoor Products for their new innovative sunglasses line made of bio-based and recycled plastic. In May 2025, Revant's Founder and CEO, Jason Bolt was named as a finalist in the Ernst and Young Entrepreneur of the Year Mountain West Program.

== Headquarters ==
Revant’s world headquarters were formerly located in the Central Eastside Industrial District of Portland, near Burnside Skatepark. The 15,000 SF masonry building was originally built in 1936 for coffee production but later served as a warehouse for the Shleifer furniture business, until its closure in 2016.

In Spring 2018, the building completed a comprehensive core and shell renovation which housed Revant’s headquarters, manufacturing, and sales operations.

In late 2023, Revant Optics relocated its headquarters to Downtown Portland, Oregon in the Pearl District.
