= Atomo =

American coffee substitute manufacturer

Atomo Coffee, Inc. is a Seattle-based startup company that produces a coffee substitute which it calls "beanless coffee." To mimic the mouthfeel and taste of coffee, the company's cold brew coffee utilizes chicory root, date seeds, grape skins and other ingredients.

== History ==
Atomo was founded in 2019, by Jarret Stopforth, a food scientist, and Andy Kleitsch, an entrepreneur. The company raised just over $25,000 from a Kickstarter campaign. It first released a cold brew coffee drink in limited quantities in 2021. In late 2023, Atomo opened a facility in California to process date pits. The company has raised US$51.6 million from investors, including some of the investors in Beyond Meat. As of March 2024, only one cafe serves Atomo coffee.

Atomo underwent a "strategic realignment" in January 2023; the company did not disclose details, but some of the approximately 50 employees reported that the company reduced the size of its workforce. On Earth Day in 2024, the company opened a new 33,547-square-foot (3,116.6 m^{2}) roasting facility in SoDo, Seattle, and announced new partnerships with coffee shops to sell its products.

== Products ==
Atomo's cold brew coffee uses date seeds, chicory root, and grape skin, among other ingredients, to mimic the taste and mouthfeel of coffee. The company introduced an espresso product at the New York Coffee Festival in 2023, and started selling it once a week at Gumption Coffee, a high-end cafe in Times Square. Their espresso is available in caffeinated and decaf varieties.

The company emphasizes environmental sustainability; it reported that its proof of concept beverage yielded 93% lower carbon emissions and required 94% less water than traditional coffee beans do.

As of October 2023, the company's beanless coffee has a wholesale price of US$20.99 per pound, significantly higher than the $10 to $14 that a typical U.S. coffee shop pays for its beans.

== Reception ==
A reviewer for CNet tried Atomo's "molecular coffee" in 2019 in a blind taste test organized by the company. She described it as "caramel-y" and "very smooth" and praised the scent of the product. The reviewer tried the company's almond milk cold brew product, and praised its taste.

Tom Bomford, the coffee director at an upscale New York City coffee chain, tried Atomo's cold brew in 2021, and told CNN, "It tastes like cold brew coffee. Just a bad cold brew coffee, perhaps."

Time named Atomo's Molecular Cold Brew one of its "Best Inventions of 2022". A reviewer noted that the product "tastes like the real deal (albeit slightly less acidic)".

In April 2024, a reviewer for Axios tried a hot oatmilk latte made with Atomo's espresso, which she described as "Not bad" and "a perfectly passable substitute" for genuine coffee beans.

Fast Company included Atomo in its 2024 "Most Innovative Companies" list, in the food category.
