= OEN =

OEN may refer to:

- Old East Norse, a language
- Old English Newsletter, an academic journal
- OpEdNews, a progressive or liberal opinion-based website
- Oregon Entrepreneurs Network
- Alexander Dale Oen (1985-2012), Norwegian Olympic swimming hopeful
