= Cascade Microtech =

American test equipment manufacturer

- Company type: Subsidiary
- Industry: Semiconductor test equipment
- Founded: 1983
- Headquarters: Beaverton, Oregon, USA; 45.45372°N 122.791043°W
- Revenue: $113 million (2012)
- Net income: $6.1 million (2012)
- Number of employees: 401 (2010)
- Website: formfactor.com

Cascade Microtech is a semiconductor test equipment manufacturer based in Beaverton in the Portland metropolitan area of the United States. Founded in 1983, the Oregon-based company employs nearly 400 people. Formerly publicly traded company as CSCD on the NASDAQ, the company is now fully merged with FormFactor, Inc.

== History ==
In the early 1980s, Eric W. Strid and K. Reed Gleason, employees at Tektronix (Tek), attempted to get their bosses to make a microwave wafer probe for testing microchips. Management declined, but did license the technology to the two, leading to the formation of Cascade Microtech in 1982 on a part-time basis. Dale E. Carlton joined the company as well, and in 1983 they produced their first product. The founders had also worked for Tek spin-off of TriQuint Semiconductor. The company turned profitable in 1984, and all left Tektronix by 1985. In May 1986, the young company leased a 1,200-square-foot (110 m^{2}) office in the Beaverton Tech Center.

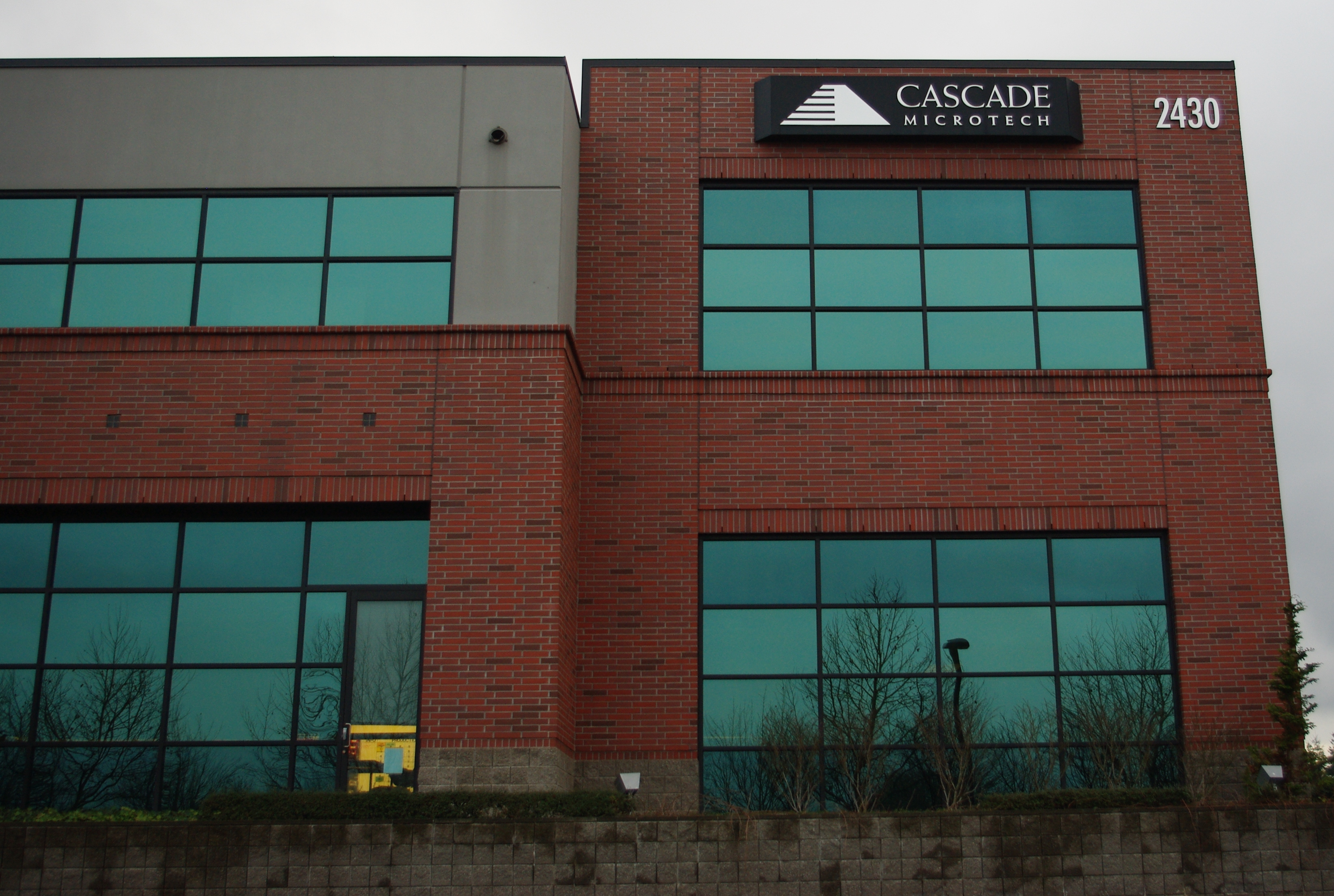
Former company headquarters in Hillsboro

By 1989, the company had grown to 55 employees and was based in Beaverton, Oregon near the Tek headquarters. The owners went without compensation the first three years the company was in business as they self-financed the venture before receiving $2.7 million in venture capital from Hewlett Packard in 1990. Cascade began working towards an initial public stock offering (IPO) as early as 1997. At that time, it expected to file for the IPO in 1998 and would use the money in part to help expand production. As of March 1997, the company employed 185 people and their biggest customers were Fujitsu, National Semiconductor, and Texas Instruments.

In 1999, the company received another $16 million in funding, which at that time the company had annual sales of $52 million. The company raised additional $10 million in capital in 2000 by selling equity to Teachers Insurance and Annuity Association. By 2001 the company employed 330 people and was still preparing for an initial public offering on its stock. The company then filed to go public in 2000, but dropped the plans in 2002.

By 2001, Cascade had signed on to move into a new headquarters in Hillsboro's AmberGlen Business Center where it occupied 100,000 square feet (9,300 m^{2}) by 2004. The company was originally located at the offices of TriQuint, its former employer. Cascade opened offices in Singapore in 2003, followed by offices in Taiwan and China in 2006.

After years of delay, Cascade Microtech filed for an IPO with the United States Securities & Exchange Commission in March 2004, hoping to raise $85 million. The company employed 243 and had revenues of $50.6 million when it filed for the IPO, and major customers included Intel and Infineon. Besides offering new shares, shares held by existing owners such as Agilent Technologies were also offered, for a total of 5.3 million shares being offered to the public. On December 15, 2004, the company started trading on the NASDAQ market, with an initial price of $14 per share under the ticker symbol CSCD. The offering raised $72 million, of which $43 million went to Cascade with the remainder to existing shareholders.

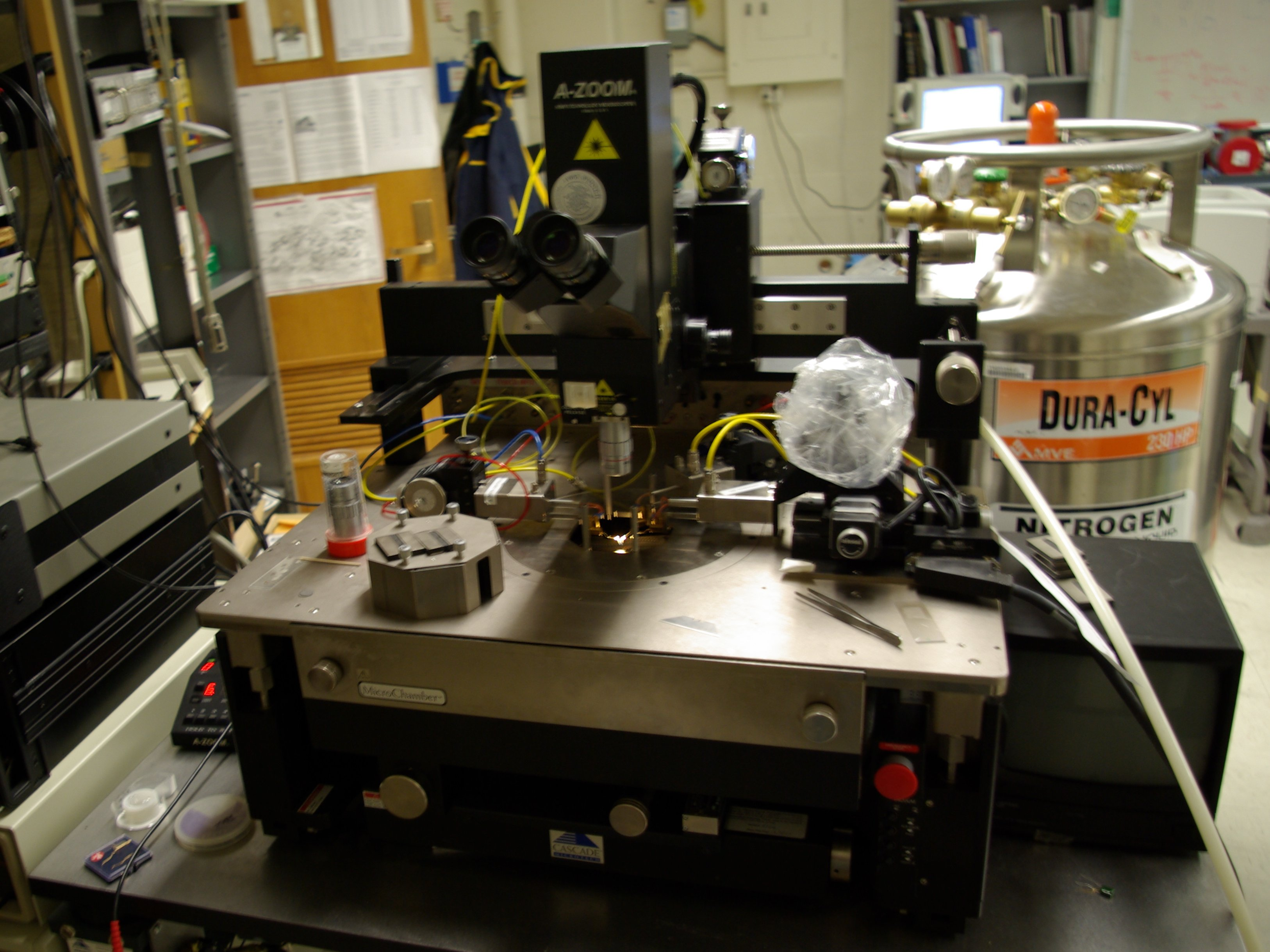
A probe station manufactured by Cascade

Cascade purchased socket maker Gryphics, Inc. in 2007 for $13.7 million and nearly 850,000 in Cascade Microtech stock. Also in 2007, Cascade Microtech GmbH was opened in Munich, Germany. The Engineering Products Division (EPD) and the Production Products Division (PPD) provides application, sales and service support for European customers.

Chief executive officer (CEO) and co-founder Eric Strid stepped down as CEO, but remained as the company chairman and became the chief technical officer in January 2008. Geoff Wild took over as CEO at that time, but resigned in December 2009. Interim CEO Paul Carlson led the company until former Merix Corp. CEO Michael Burger was hired in June 2010 and took office in July.

In January 2010, Cascade purchased SUSS MicroTec AG's chip-testing division for $9.8 million. That division had been Cascade's largest rival. The company's revenue for the third quarter in 2010 was $25.3 million, a record for the company. However, Cascade still had a net loss of $400,000.

In 2011, Cascade announced their collaboration with IMEC for the development of 3D Through-Silicon-Via (TSV) structures testing methods and methodologies.

Cascade posted revenues of $113 for fiscal year 2012 and had its first profit that year since 2007. In October 2013, the company bought ATT Advanced Temperature Test Systems in a cash and stock deal valued at $27.7 million. The company announced it was sold to FormFactor, Inc. in February 2016 for $352 million, with the deal closing in June 2016.

In 2017, Cascade Microtech, together with IMEC, developed a fully-automatic system to pre-bond test advanced 3D chips. The two companies won the 2017 National Instruments Engineering Impact Award in the electronics and semiconductor division for their development in which they titled "Probing of Large-Array, Fine-Pitch Microbumps for 3D ICs".

== Products ==
Cascade Microtech manufactures testing equipment for the semiconductor industry. These probes test the chips before the chips are cut from the wafers (silicon or gallium arsenide), ensuring the chips do what they are designed to accomplish. Production is performed at the company's facilities in Beaverton, Oregon and Dresden, Germany. In 2018, the company introduced autonomous probing systems for RF testing. After acquiring FRT in 2019 the company also offers metrology measuring systems.

== See also ==
- Silicon Forest
- List of companies based in Oregon
