= Brandlive =

Software as a service company based in Portland, Oregon, US

Brandlive, Inc.
- Type: Private
- Industry: Software
- Founded: 2010; 16 years ago
- Headquarters: Portland, OR, USA
- Key people: Sam Kolbert-Hyle (President & CEO)
- Website: brandlive.com

Brandlive, Inc. is an American software-as-a-service (SaaS) company based in Portland, Oregon, that develops virtual-event and video production software.

== Products ==
Brandlive Platform includes tools to create templated sites designed to host video content including audience engagement & interaction features such as chat, reactions, polls, product catalogues, and Q&A.

Greenroom is a cloud-based video production tool that can stream to any destination supporting RTMP ingestion. Greenroom offers a variety of features, including the ability to record video, switch between pre-recorded and live video, and overlay graphic elements that stream to destinations on top of video.

== History ==
2010 — 2019

Brandlive was founded in 2010 by Ben McKinley and Fritz Brumder as a product of Cascade Web Development, as a way to incorporate live video into online shopping. The idea for Brandlive came to Brumder when he was using Skype to see a friend's new retail store in New York City, and made a purchase as a result of the demonstration via live video. In 2012, Brandlive was established as its own separate entity.

In May 2013, the company received $1.6 million in Series A funding from Oregon Angel Fund, Angel Oregon, Portland Seed Fund, among others.

In 2016, Stephen Marsh's Archivist Capital led Brandlive's $3.2 million funding round.

Brandlive closed 2017 with revenue of $1.9M, and 2018 with $3.1M, and was featured as one of the top ten fastest growing Portland, OR companies.

In July 2018, CEO Fritz Brumder moved into the role of COO, and Jeff Allen was announced as the new CEO.

2020 — 2021

At the start of 2020, Archivist Capital finalized a transaction to buy most of the business and Sam Kolbert-Hyle, a partner at Archivist, stepped in as Brandlive's new CEO. After analyzing the usage of the platform, Kolbert-Hyle invested in a new direction of product development: to reinvent large, internal corporate allhands and townhall meetings.

Brandlive launched Greenroom in May 2020, because of the COVID-19 Pandemic.

Starting in May 2020, Brandlive did 230 events for Biden Campaign for President team, securing more than $30 million in donations. The largest fundraising event featured President Barack Obama and raised over in $11 million with more than 470,000 views. Brandlive also did celebrity reunion fundraisers including the casts of The Princess Bride, Parks and Rec, The West Wing, and more.

2022 — Present

In April 2024 Brandlive acquired Notified's virtual event and webinar business. The acquisition quadrupled the size of Brandlive's business and added roughly 100 employees to the team.

In January 2025, Brandlive acquired the software company, 6Connex. In the same year, Brandlive acquired Media Platform, with a focus on enterprise streaming and town halls, and Hubilo to expand its AI presence.

In July 2025, Brandlive partnered with WNBA Portland to create behind-the-scenes content of the team's journey.

== Recognition ==
In September 2013, Brandlive was announced as a finalist for the Oregon Entrepreneurs Network Tom Holce Entrepreneurship Awards.

In March 2021, Fast Company named Brandlive as 2021's #1 Most Innovative Company in the Live Events category. Fast Company also named Brandlive on their “50 Most Innovative Companies of the Year” at #44 out of 400 global companies.
