= FormFactor =

Semiconductor company

FormFactor, Inc.
- Type: Public
- Traded as: Nasdaq: FORM; S&P 400 component
- Industry: Semiconductor
- Founded: 1993; 33 years ago
- Founder: Igor Khandros
- Headquarters: Livermore, California, U.S.
- Revenue: ▲US$785 million (2025)
- Net income: ▼US$54.4 million (2025)
- Number of employees: 2,300
- Website: formfactor.com

FormFactor, Inc. is a provider of test and measurement technologies for integrated circuits, with its headquarters in Livermore, California. It provides semiconductor companies with products to improve device performance and provide test and measurement technologies for integrated circuits.

== History ==
FormFactor was founded in Elmsford, NY in 1993, and set up its first headquarters in Livermore, California in 1995. The company completed an initial public offering (IPO) on the Nasdaq as FORM, in June 2003 with 6 million shares priced at $14.

FormFactor released the first x64 DRAM probe card in 2000, followed by the x128 DRAM probe card in 2002. The company shipped the first SmartMatrix full-wafer probe cards in February 2009.

In October 2012, FormFactor signed an agreement with Astria Semiconductors Holdings, Inc. for the acquisition of MicroProbe, Inc. for $100 million in cash and $16.8 million in stocks. In June 2016, FormFactor acquired Cascade Microtech for $352 million.

In 2019, a second service center was opened in Grenoble, France, to expand the company's existing center in Dresden, Germany. In October 2019, FormFactor acquired Germany-based FRT for $19.7 million. FRT Metrology business was acquired by Camtek in October 2023. In July 2020, Advantest Corporation's probe card assets were acquired by FormFactor for $35 million and in October, it acquired High Precision Devices, Inc. (HPD).

An additional manufacturing facility was opened in Livermore in 2021, to expand the existing and provide an additional 90,000 square feet of facility.

In February 2024, the company's ESG risk rating was low at just 17.1%.

== Locations ==
FormFactor, Inc. is headquartered in Livermore, California with manufacturing facilities and offices in the United States, Europe and Asia:

United States

- Beaverton (Oregon)
- Boulder (Colorado)
- Carlsbad, Baldwin Park, San Jose (California)
- Woburn (Massachusetts)
- Farmer's Branch (Texas)

Europe

- Thiendorf, Dresden, Aschheim (Germany)
- Legnano (Italy)

Asia

- Yokohama (Japan)
- Gyeonggi-Do (South Korea)
- Marsiling (Singapore)
- Zhubei (Taiwan)
