= Eldad Matityahu =

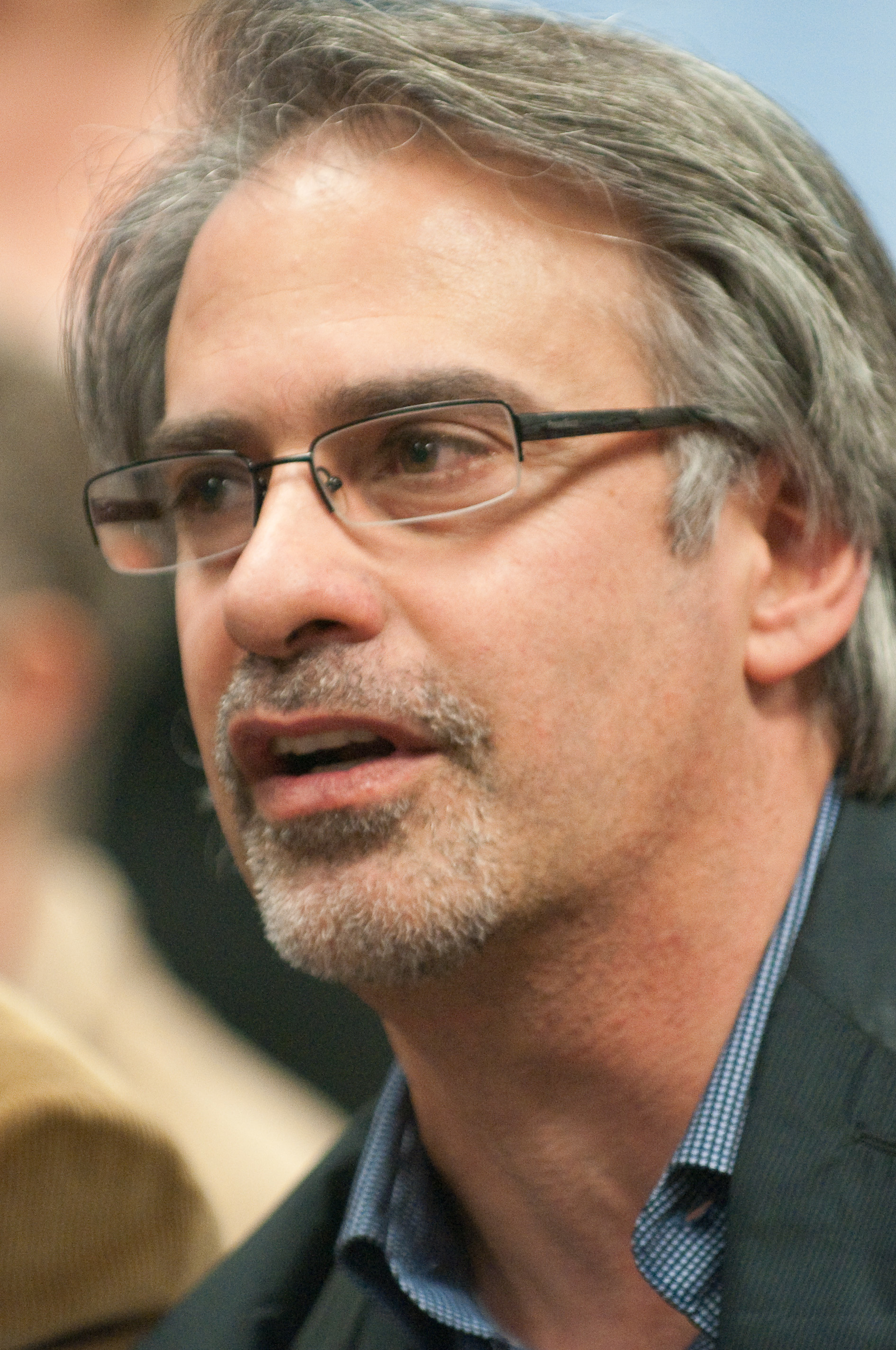
- Born: Israel
- Education: San Jose State University
- Occupations: Founder, Net Optics

Eldad Matityahu (born 1962) is the founder and chairman of the board of Net Optics, a privately held California-based provider of network visibility solutions that allow companies to protect against hacking, intrusion, confidentiality breach and other malicious attacks. Net Optics specializes in designing visibility into networks to address challenges related to virtualization, compliance and security.

== Early life and business ventures ==
Born and raised in Israel, Matityahu moved to the United States with his parents as a teenager in 1976. He attended high school in Palo Alto, California, and earned a business degree from San Jose State University. His parents ran a restaurant that was only open for breakfast and lunch. While in business school, Eldad ran a barbecue business at their restaurant during dinner hours. He went on to open two frozen yogurt stores called "IT'S A RIOT! YOGURRT" based on a business plan he wrote for school. He sold the yogurt business three years later, switching gears to work in networking technology at a fiber optics company. He was involved in marketing and leadership development for AMP (now a division of Tyco International).

== Net Optics ==
Matityahu founded Net Optics in 1996, investing the proceeds from a frozen yogurt business. Net Optics took shape in a spare room in Matityahu's apartment, bootstrapped without venture capital funding. Under his leadership, Net Optics has been profitable for every quarter since its inception. In 2011, the company was recognized by the Silicon Valley/San Jose Business Journal as one of Silicon Valley's fastest growing companies, and by Red Herring in its North America and Global Top 100 lists. Its customers include 85% of the Fortune 100 companies. The company delivers solutions for real-time IT visibility, monitoring and control.

Matityahu oversees the launch of six to eight new products each year, guiding the vision and direction of the company with a ‚"Customer First!" philosophy. In 2012, Matityahu led the company's global expansion with the acquisition of Australia's TripleLayer Networks and nMetric without venture capital funding.

== Automobile enthusiast ==
Matityahu has been an automobile enthusiast ever since he watched his brother build a go-cart while they were growing up in Israel. As an avid collector, he incorporates his passion into the corporate culture. The company's fleet of branded Mini Coopers serve as an employee perk. His interest in customizing and driving cars has been compared to his unorthodox approach to business, and Matityahu credits the hobby with stimulating his creative thinking.

In 2011, Net Optics sponsored the Mille Miglia North America Tribute and the 25th annual Santa Barbara Concours d'Elegance, and Matityahu competed in the 1,000 mile race in a 1954 Corvette.

== Investment and philanthropy ==
Matityahu supports young startup companies, including a $75,000 investment in a teenage entrepreneur's business plan. His family has donated to the Oshman Family Jewish Community Center in Palo Alto, and is active with Sunday Friends, a charity that helps families move out of poverty.
