= Cold brew tea =

Brewing method and product

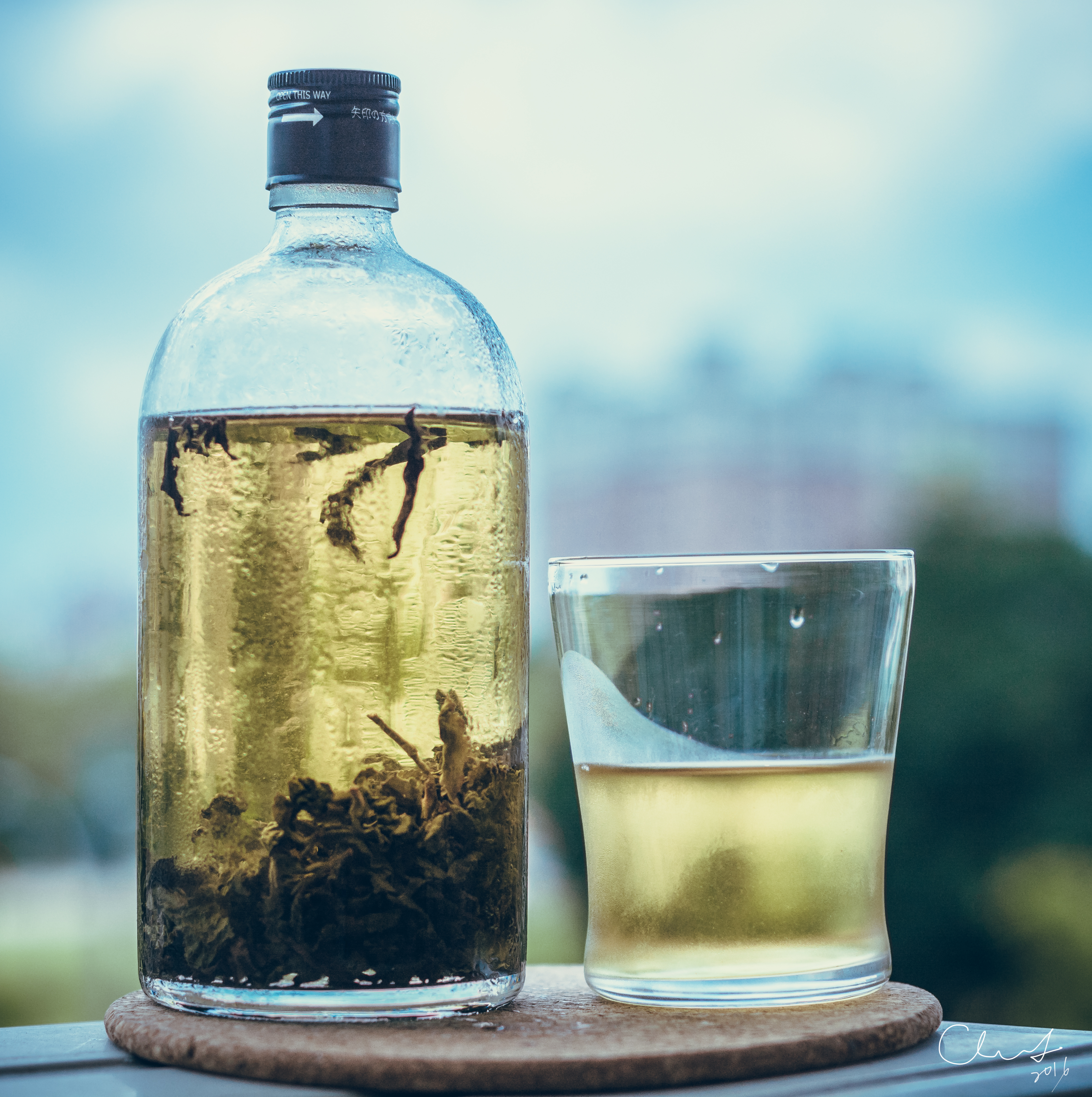
Cold brewed oolong and black tea

Cold brew tea is tea steeped in cold or room temperature water for an extended period of time. The process brews the tea leaves slowly, using time rather than temperature to release the flavors.

Cold brewing tea is a practice which comes from Japan, where it is believed to gently extract flavors from the tea, as hotter brewing can scorch the tea, creating a bitter taste.

== Method ==
The ratio of tea to water is typically 40% tea to 60% water depending on the desired strength. Cold brewing requires a much higher quantity of tea to ensure that enough flavor is extracted into the water. The steeped tea is usually left to brew in room temperature or refrigeration for 16–24 hours.

== Chemical composition ==
Cold brewed white tea is shown to have higher amounts of antioxidants when compared to hot brewed.

== See also ==
- Cold brew coffee
- Sun tea
