= MathStar =

Semiconductor company based in Oregon (1999-2010)

MathStar, Inc.

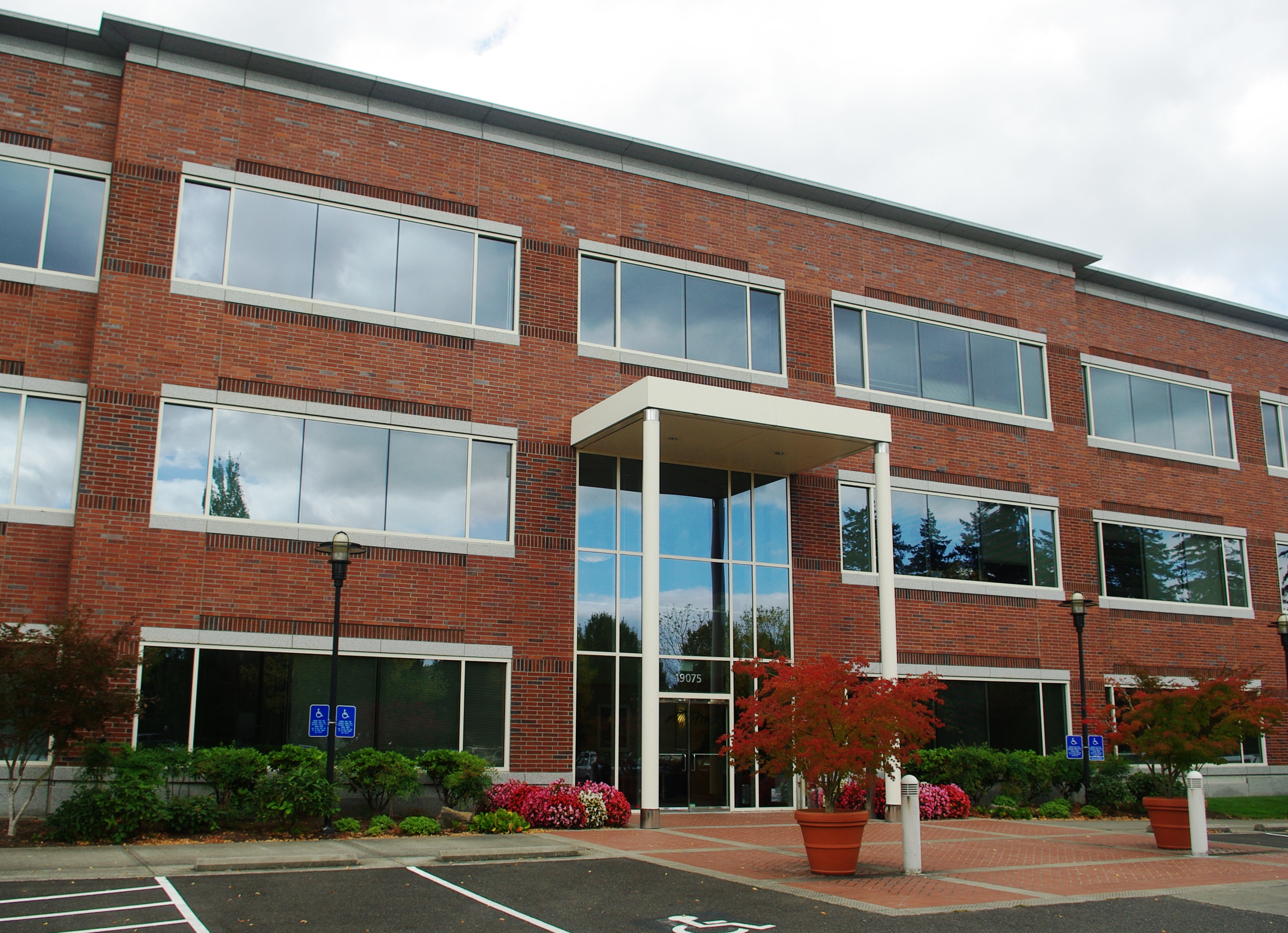
- Former headquarters in Hillsboro, Oregon
- Company type: Public
- Industry: Semiconductor
- Founded: 1999; 27 years ago
- Founder: Douglas Pihl
- Defunct: 2010
- Fate: Reverse merger into Sajan
- Headquarters: Hillsboro, Oregon, USA; 45.542°N 122.8734°W
- Products: field programmable object array

MathStar, Inc., was an American, fabless semiconductor company based in Oregon. Founded in Minnesota in 1999, the company moved to the Portland metropolitan area where it remained until it completed a reverse merger with Sajan, Inc. in 2010. MathStar never made a profit after raising $137 million over the lifetime of the company, including via several stock offerings while the company was publicly traded on the NASDAQ market. The company's only product was a field programmable object array (FPOA) chip.

== History ==
Robert Warren (Bob) Johnson and Douglas Pihl started discussing the formation of a company in 1999 to design a new type of digital signal processors (DSP) microprocessor chip, and founded MathStar the next year and began raising funds. The two founded the company in Minneapolis, Minnesota, and raised $18 million for the venture by September 2000 when it had grown to approximately 15 employees. MathStar's new processor was to be based on using a series of algorithms developed by Johnson that were imprinted directly into the processor.

In 2002, the company raised another $15.3 million in capital followed by $6 million in 2003. At one point in 2003 the company planned to merge with Digital MediaCom as MathStar still worked to finish developing its chip. MathStar first started producing its processor in 2003, but technical problems led to additional design changes with hopes to restart production in April 2004 after raising an additional $10 million.

In May 2005, the company announced plans for an initial public offering (IPO) in hopes of securing $28 million for the then Minnetonka-based company. The company then priced the offering at $6 per share in October of that year with the plan of selling 4 million shares on the Nasdaq market under the ticker symbol MATH. MathStar hoped to raise $21 million at that point to pay down debt and fund research. The company then held the IPO in October 2005 and raised $24 million.

MathStar opened an office in Oregon in May 2005 and announced in December that year they would move company headquarters to Hillsboro, Oregon, to have better access to microprocessor talent in the area's Silicon Forest. The company already had 22 employees there at the time, but planned to keep an office in Minnesota as well. At that time the company's market capitalization valued the company at $93 million.

MathStar officially relocated to Hillsboro in March 2006 from Plymouth, Minnesota. At that point MathStar had 35 employees in Hillsboro with plans to hire 15 more. In early 2006 the company's auditors raised concerns over MathStar's ability to continue as a going concern, with the company announcing they would raise more funds to address the issue. MathStar raised an additional $12.6 million by selling stock and warrants in September 2006, and used part of the proceeds to increase staffing to 56 people. At that time, the company also finished its first run of production of its chips using Taiwan Semiconductor Manufacturing Company as the contract manufacturer. MathStar announced in February 2007 that they were working with Mentor Graphics on the design tools for MathStar's field programmable object array (FPOA) chip.

A few months later the fabless semiconductor company announced that for fiscal year 2006 revenues totaled $53,000 and lost $22.5 million. The company announced it would sell another $40 million in stock in March 2007. On May 10, 2007, it announced the company only had enough operating capital to stay in business until Labor Day, and that to raise funds it would sell another $25 million in stock. Sales executive Glen R. Wiley then left the company that month. Later that month, the NASDAQ stock market sent notice to MathStar that it could be delisted from the stock exchange due to equity requirements for stockholders. In early June 2007 MathStar again sold stock to raise $25 million, followed by another offering later that month in an attempt to raise $4.6 million.

== Collapse ==
MathStar again received a warning from the Nasdaq about delisting in January 2008. In February of that year the company finished development of its chips for use in a transcoder system South Korea based LG Electronic developed for MPEG4 to MPEG2 video, which was used in the hotel industry. At the end of May 2008 the company announced it was closing and looking for a buyer. This included stopping development of its chip. The company's stock was delisted from NASDAQ in October 2008.

For 2007, MathStar increased revenues to $588,000, while the company's losses declined slightly to $20.4 million. In May 2008, shareholders approved a reverse stock split in which for every five shares held, shareholders received one share, which helped to increase the share price and allow the company to remain listed on the Nasdaq market. In October 2008, the company started looking to sell its technology, and PureChoice Inc. made an unsolicited bid to purchase the company. The deal would have been all stock and allowed PureChoice to use MathStar accumulated losses as tax write-offs. MathStar rejected PureChoice's offer as CEO Pihl hoped for a merger with a company that had better cash flow, while some stockholders wanted the company to liquidate the company's assets.

MathStar rejected another bid from PureChoice in November 2008, while a shareholder requested the company vote on liquidation in February 2009. The next month, results for fiscal year 2008 showed a loss of $14.6 million with revenues of $536,000. Shareholder Joe Gensor demanded the company's board vote on liquidation or face legal action in May 2009, the same month MathStar again rejected a merger proposal from PureChoice.

Tiberius Capital II LLC began pursuing the company in late May 2009 with an offer of $1.15 per share, but the company urged stockholders to reject the offer from the investment fund. A few days after Tiberius’ offer, PureChoice made another offer of its own, this time at $1.28 per share. MathStar's board urged rejection of the Tiberius bid due to ongoing negotiations concerning a merger with yet another private company, or the possibility of resuming operations. A week later MathStar delayed a vote on whether or not to liquidate, and two days later officially rejected PureChoice's fourth offer.

Tiberius then increased its bid in July 2009 by offering to buy all outstanding stock, instead of just a controlling interest, which MathStar's board again rejected. Later that month, MathStar announced it was working on a possible merger with Sajan Inc., leading founder and CEO Pihl to resign from the company. The next month Tiberius upped its offer for MathStar to $1.35 per share.

The bids by Tiberius were unsuccessful, with the firm's head John Fife accusing MathStar, Sajan, and others of securities fraud over the merger between MathStar and Sajan. MathStar and Sajan were then among several plaintiffs who sued Fife after his comments. Then, on February 23, 2010, the merger between Sajan and MathStar was completed with the MathStar name remaining, but the products and services being those of Sajan. A few days later, the name was officially changed from MathStar to Sajan, Inc., with Shannon Zimmerman as the president and CEO.

== Legacy ==
MathStar was never profitable, yet raised a total of $137 million during its existence. The company's only product was a field programmable object array (FPOA) microchip. The headquarters in Hillsboro were at 19075 NW Tanasbourne Drive, Suite 200. Sajan developed online language translation software for use by businesses.

== See also ==
- Lattice Semiconductor
- Silicon Forest
