= Act-On =

American software company

- Developer: Act-On
- Release: 2008; 18 years ago
- Operating system: Software as a service
- Type: Marketing automation
- License: Subscription
- Website: act-on.com

Act-On Software is a software-as-a-service product for marketing automation. The company is headquartered in Portland, Oregon and was founded in 2008, originally retailing its software exclusively through Cisco, which provided $2 million in funding.

== History ==
Act-On was founded in 2008 by Raghu Raghavan, formerly a founder of Responsys. Act-On initially sold through alternate channels, but later created its own sales team.

In 2011, Act-On raised a third round for $10 million in June 2011 and established a new location in Silicon Valley. The company raised an additional $16 million in funding the following year.

By 2013, the number of employees had grown to 140, up from 11 in 2010 and 35 in 2011.

In April 2014, $42 million in additional funding was raised, which was the largest funding round in the Oregon technology market since the dot com bubble. In 2015, Act-On expanded its executive team with a new CFO, formerly of the company Jive, a VP of demand generation, previously with ExactTarget, and a VP of cloud operations.

In 2015, Act-On announced the appointment of Andy MacMillan to the position of CEO. The former CEO and company founder Raghu Raghavan assumed the role of CTO. Prior to joining Act-On Software, Andy held several senior leadership positions at Salesforce, including Chief Operating Officer of the Products Division and Senior Vice President & General Manager of Data.com.

In 2018, Act-On announced its board of directors had appointed Kate Johnson as the company's new CEO to replace Andy MacMillan. The company consolidated its operations to Portland, Oregon at this time. Ms. Johnson had served as Act-On's CFO for the prior 3 years and was endorsed by Diane Fraiman, Act-On board member and investor in the formal press release.

In 2019 Act-On raised a second round of funding for $4 million.

In June 2020, Act-On Software rebranded. It was later acquired by Boston Capital Ventures (BCV, LLC) for $53 million in February 2024.

== Software ==
The "Quick Start" guide in Act-On's online user interface.

Act-On is a subscription-based software-as-a-service (SaaS) product for marketing automation. Its software products are for email marketing, landing pages, social media prospecting, CRM integration, lead management, webinar management, and analytics.

Act-On has a Twitter prospector tool introduced in 2010 that automates the publishing and monitoring of content on Twitter, tracking prospective customers and measuring their activity. An Act-On Insight tool, released in June 2012, compares a company's social media marketing performance to competitors. Its Hot Prospects tool, introduced at the 2011 Dreamforce conference, creates a dashboard in Salesforce that scores the likelihood a prospect is ready to make a purchasing decision. A set of software tools for search engine optimization, pay-per-click advertising and other inbound tactics was introduced in May 2013 under the name Act-On Inbound alongside a mobile app. In July 2014, Act-On announced a set of product updates intended to improve data visualization and customization. Enhancements included a responsive email composer and expanded CRM integrations.

In March 2015, Act-On produced Act-On Anywhere, a Chrome application allowing users access to marketing automation data. In June of the same year, Act-On released Data Studio, a tool allowing users to visualize, select, configure and export data to any business intelligence platform.

Act-On software integrates with Webex and GoTo Meeting. It also integrates with data and analytics services, such as Google Analytics. More connectors are available for Microsoft Dynamics, WordPress, Salesforce, SugarCRM, Oktopost and others. The Act-On platform offers native integrations with all major CRM systems. A separate version for agencies has an agency dashboard to centrally manage multiple client campaigns and is sold at a lower bulk price.
