= RISE Brewing Co. =

American coffee company

Coordinates: 41°2′11″N 73°33′7″W

- Industry: Coffee
- Founded: 2015
- Founder: Jarrett McGovern, Grant Gyesky, Justin Weinstein, Hudson Gaines-Ross
- Headquarters: New York, NY
- Area served: United States and Canada
- Website: risebrewingco.com

RISE Brewing Co., is a New York and Oregon-based nitro cold brew coffee company specializing in nitrogen-infused organic coffee and sourcing Fair Trade organic beans from Peru's Chanchamayo Valley. It uses a proprietary reverse-osmosis spring water filtration process.

== History ==
In May 2015, the company launched out of Brooklyn's Colonie restaurant by serial consumer goods entrepreneur (Hudson Davis-Ross) and a group of childhood friends who met while attending the Brunswick School (Jarrett McGovern, Grant Gyesky, Justin Weinstein). The group started nitro cold-brewing in 2014 out of McGovern's New York City apartment before moving brewing operations into Gyesky's garage and eventually into a brewery located in Connecticut. By July 2017 the brand was available for purchase in retailers in cities such as Los Angeles, San Francisco, and elsewhere. While the company's retail business initially had been focused on the East Coast with distribution in grocers like Whole Foods, independent retailers, and offices, the brand – by January 2018 – expanded into the Pacific Northwest entering Safeway stores as well as independent retailers via Portland Columbia Distributing. There is a production facility in Stamford, Connecticut.

== Products ==
In July 2018, while having previously focused solely on nitro cold brew, the company released a new series of nitro cold brew lattes on Kickstarter: lattes. According to the San Diego Tribune, as of August 2018, the company's Oat Milk and Mocha Latte were the first ready-to-drink beverages in the United States to use organic oat milk. The company has continued to expand its offerings, with the announcement of its first nitrogen-infused canned tea released in June 2020.

As of September 2018, the brand sold online and in-store in the US and parts of Canada, and it has widened its wholesale reach to cover US cities on the East and West Coast as well as the Midwest. In October 2018, the company opened its first flagship location in New York City.

In March 2019, Rise expanded their product offering with the launch of organic oat milk, and in July 2021, they launched a non-nitro cold brew in a multi-serve carton.

== Recognition ==
In March 2019, USA Climbing announced a two-year partnership with Rise Brewing where its nitro cold brew coffee would be the official provider for the organization. Rise Brewing has additionally partnered with local brewery Half Full Brewery to establish the "first and only" hard coffee within the beer market.

Cofounders McGovern and Weinstein were recognized in the Connecticut Magazine 30 Under 40 list in 2019.
