= Merix Corporation =

- Type: Public
- Traded as: Nasdaq: MERX
- Industry: Electronics
- Founded: 1994; 32 years ago, Oregon
- Headquarters: Beaverton, Oregon, United States
- Key people: William C. McCormick (chairman); Mike Burger (CEO)
- Products: Printed circuit boards
- Revenue: $287 million USD (FY 2009)
- Operating income: ▼$49 million USD (FY 2006)
- Net income: ▼$49 million USD (FY 2006)
- Number of employees: 2,950 (2009)
- Parent: TTM Technologies
- Divisions: Merix San Jose; Merix Asia; Merix Oregon
- Footnotes; Financial data

Merix Corporation was an American printed circuit board (PCB) manufacturer based in Beaverton, Oregon. Prior to a merger in 2010 with Viasystems, the company had been the 31st largest public company in Oregon based on market capitalization as of 2006. The company is now part of TTM Technologies.

== History ==
Merix Corporation was started in 1994 as a spin-off from Tektronix, Inc. in Oregon's Silicon Forest, employing 700 people. Tektronix continued to own 27% of the new company. The City of Portland's Office of Sustainable Development awarded Merix a BEST Award in 1997 for water conservation. Merix lost $9.6 million on revenues of $87 million in 2002, and followed that with losses of $30 million in 2003 on revenues of $95 million.

In December 2004, the company bought Data Circuit Systems and named the unit Merix San Jose. That fiscal year, Merix returned to profitability with a $20,000 in earnings from $156 million in revenues. On September 29, 2005, Merix purchased the operations of Eastern Pacific Circuits Holding Limited. Merix renamed these operations as Merix Asia. In February 2007, the company was warned by NASDAQ for failing to have a full three member independent audit committee as required by NASDAQ listing rules.

For the 2006 fiscal year they had revenues of $309 million and a profit of $1.4 million. In January 2008, Merix announced the closing of their Wood Village, Oregon, factory they opened in 2004. The company laid off 180 people company-wide as part of a restructuring plan at that time. Another 230 people were laid off in early 2009, and the company then lost $8.4 million on nearly $60 million in revenues in the quarter that ended in May 2009.

Also in 2009, the company expanded its military and aerospace customer base, adding contracts to companies such as Rockwell Collins. In October 2009, Merix announced they would merge with Viasystems with the combined entity headquartered in St. Louis, Missouri. Merix reported a quarterly profit for the second quarter of their 2010 fiscal year, the first such profit since 2007. The merger with Viasystems was completed in February 2010. Viasystems was acquired by California-based TTM Technologies in May 2015 for $368 million.

== Operations ==
The company's main domestic production facility was located in Forest Grove, Oregon, in the Portland metropolitan area. The 250,000-square-foot (23,000 m^{2}) facility employed about 800 people and was the city's largest employer. Merix's other U.S. plant is located in San Jose, California. Company headquarters were in Beaverton, Oregon, also in the Portland area, with Mike Burger as the chief executive officer since 2007.

Merix produced printed circuit boards used in various electronic equipment worldwide. This was primarily multi-layered rigid PCBs used in the automotive industry, communications equipment, testing equipment, and the computer industry. The manufacturing facilities were located primarily in China.
