= AWS Elemental =

American software company

- Formerly: Elemental Technologies
- Type: Subsidiary
- Industry: Video software
- Incorporated: Delaware
- Founded: 2006
- Founders: Sam Blackman; Jesse Rosenzweig; Brian Lewis
- Headquarters: Portland, Oregon, United States
- Key people: Alex Dunlap (General Manager)
- Revenue: $49.2 million (2014)
- Owner: Amazon
- Number of employees: 209 (2014)
- Parent: Amazon Web Services
- Website: www.elemental.com

Elemental was an American software company based in Portland, Oregon, and active from 2006 to 2015. It was founded by three engineers formerly of the semiconductor company Pixelworks: Sam Blackman (CEO), Jesse Rosenzweig (CTO), and Brian Lewis. In 2015, it was acquired by Amazon.

== History ==
In July 2012, Elemental products supported the broadcast of the 2012 Summer Olympics on internet devices for media companies including the BBC, Euro sport, Terra Networks, and others.

In September 2013, Elemental was named to the Silicon Forest top 25 by The Oregonian. The company ranked #24 among the region's largest technology companies.

In October 2013, Elemental provided live 4K HEVC video streaming of the 2013 Osaka Marathon in a workflow designed by K-Opticom, a telecommunications operator in Japan.

In April 2017, the company changed its name from Elemental Technologies to AWS Elemental.

=== Feared security compromise ===
In 2015, during security testing conducted as a prelude to a possible acquisition by Amazon, it was reported that some Elemental servers contained chips from Chinese manufacturing subcontractors that allowed backdoor access. According to a U.S. government investigation, the chips were inserted by a People’s Liberation Army unit. These reports were denied by all of the companies involved, no such chips were ever found, and the acquisition proceeded without further incident.

== Funding ==
Elemental received its initial investments in 2007 in the amount of $1.05 million from three angel funds: the Seattle-based Alliance of Angels, the Oregon Angel Fund, and the Bend Venture Conference.

In July 2008, Elemental announced it had closed its first round of venture capital financing, receiving $7.1 million, which included investments from General Catalyst Partners of Boston, Massachusetts and Voyager Capital of Seattle, Washington.

In 2009, Elemental formed a partnership with In-Q-Tel – the venture capital arm of the Central Intelligence Agency. Elemental servers were subsequently used in various secure capacities, including by the United States Department of Defense, the United States Navy, NASA, the United States Congress and the Department of Homeland Security.

In July 2010, Elemental raised an additional $7.5 million in Series B financing. Steamboat Ventures, a venture capital firm affiliated with The Walt Disney Company, joined existing venture funds General Catalyst and Voyager Capital in the financing round.

In May 2012, Elemental closed its Series C financing for $13 million from Norwest Venture Partners.

In December 2014, Elemental closed its Series D financing for $14.5 million led by Telstra and Sky.

In September 2015, Elemental was acquired by Amazon Web Services, for an estimated $350 million.

== Products ==
=== AWS Media Services ===
In November 2017, Amazon Web Services announced AWS Media Services, a group of five services that are intended for video providers to generate video offerings in the cloud, with the ability to scale.

AWS Media Services include the following individual services:

AWS Elemental MediaConvert transcodes file-based video content.

AWS Elemental MediaLive encodes live video for televisions or connected devices.

AWS Elemental MediaPackage prepares and secures live video streams for delivery to connected devices.

AWS Elemental MediaStore delivers video from media-optimized storage.

AWS Elemental MediaTailor inserts targeted advertising into streaming video.

AWS Elemental MediaConnect transport stream based video contribution and distribution.

=== Elemental Live ===
In April 2010, Elemental introduced its enterprise product, Elemental Live, a video processing system that provides video and audio encoding for live streaming to media platforms.

Elemental Live made its debut at NAB in Las Vegas, Nevada, April 12–15, 2010, with a four-screen demonstration featuring simultaneous real-time encoding of multiple video streams targeted to mobile, tablet, web and HDTV platforms.

=== Elemental Server ===
In November 2009, Elemental released the first video server appliance to utilize the graphics processing unit for video on demand (VOD) transcoding. The company claims its performance equals that of seven dual quad-core CPU servers. Other potential benefits include conversion speed, reduced power usage, less physical space, and overall cost, which is reported to be less than half of a CPU server. Elemental Servers reportedly sold for as much as $100,000 per machine, with a profit margin of up to 70%.

=== Elemental Delta ===
Elemental Delta is a video delivery platform designed to optimize the monetization, management and distribution of multiscreen video across internal and external IP networks. Elemental Delta has been presented at IBC in September 2014 and won the IABM Design and Innovation award for Playout and Delivery Systems.

=== Elemental Cloud ===
Elemental Cloud provides transcoding services in a cloud computing environment using clustered graphics processors.

=== Elemental Statmux ===
Elemental Statmux is a software-based statistical multiplexer that optimizes content delivery for pay TV operators by reallocating bits in real time between video encoders and combining the outputs from multiple encoders into a single transport stream.

=== Elemental Conductor ===
Elemental Conductor is a scalable management system of two or more Elemental video processing systems.

=== Badaboom ===

On October 23, 2008, Elemental released Badaboom, a consumer media converter, in partnership with Nvidia. Badaboom uses Elemental's video engine to transcode video files from several formats, including MPEG2, H.264, HDV, AVCHD, and RAW, into the H.264 format for devices such as the iPod, iPhone, and Sony PSP.

Elemental Technologies announced Badaboom 2.0 is the final version and stopped producing the product. The company supported Badaboom until April, 2013, without further software updates.

== Awards ==
- 2023 NAB Best of Show – Streaming solutions for MediaConnect Gateway
- 2017 NAB Best of Show – Recognized for 4K video processing by NewBay Media
- 2016 EY Entrepreneur of the Year – Sam Blackman was named the winner of the EY Entrepreneur of the Year 2016 award in the Pacific Northwest region in the technology category
- 2015 TVB Awards – Winner in the Multiplatform Production and Delivery category
- 2014 IABM Design and Innovation—Best Playout and Delivery System
- 2013 Cable & Satellite International (CSI)—-Best in Digital Video Processing, Elemental Technologies
- 2013 ConnectedWorld.TV Awards—Best Delivery Technology, Elemental Technologies
- 2013 Portland Business Journal 100 Fastest Growing Companies—No. 6, Elemental Technologies
- 2013 Oregon Technology Awards—Technology Growth Company of the Year, Elemental Technologies
- 2012 Forbes America's 100 Most Promising Companies—No. 23, Elemental Technologies
- 2012 Inc. (magazine) 500, America's Fastest Growing Private Companies—No. 52, Elemental Technologies
- 2011 Forbes America's 100 Most Promising Companies—No. 54, Elemental Technologies
- 2011 Streaming Media Editors' Pick—Elemental Live
- 2010 TV Technology Mario Award—Elemental Live
