= VeriWave =

Company in Oregon, USA

VeriWave, Inc.
- Company type: Private
- Industry: Computer networking
- Headquarters: Oregon, United States
- Website: VeriWave.com

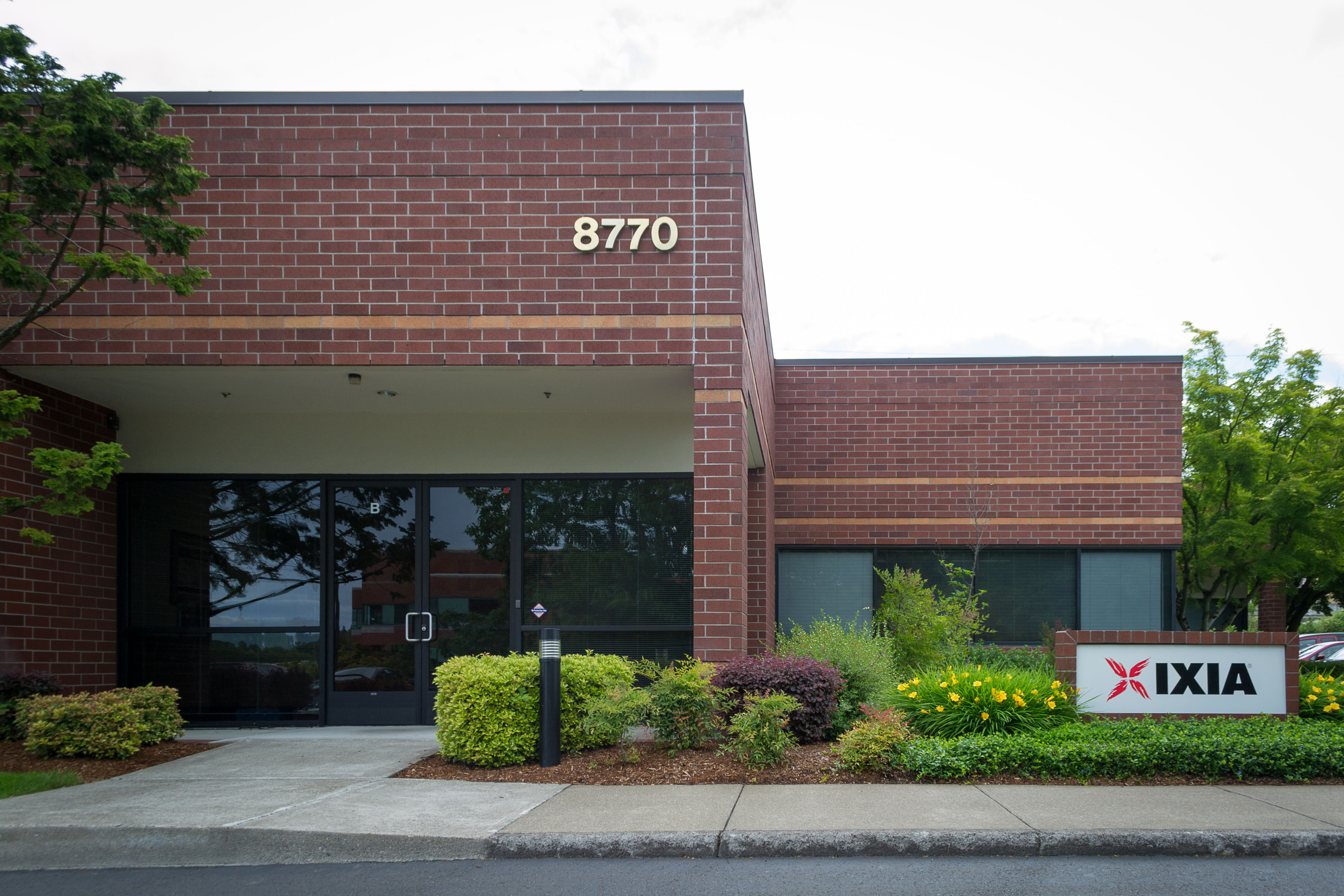
The former offices of Veriwave, now Ixia, in Beaverton, Oregon

VeriWave is a company in Beaverton, Oregon, U.S. It was founded in 2002 to design and manufacture specialized testing equipment for Wi-Fi and Ethernet—products primarily of interest to manufacturers of wireless access points and network infrastructure.

VeriWave was a privately held company with investors including US Venture Partners and TL Ventures. Primary customers include Cisco and Aruba Networks.

EE Times mentioned VeriWave for MIMO (multiple antennas to improve transmission) testing as well as packet loss analysis in 802.11 networks.

On July 18, 2011, Ixia announced acquisition of VeriWave.

On April 18, 2017, Keysight Technologies announced completion of the acquisition of Ixia, thereby adding VeriWave products to their portfolio.

== See also ==
- WLAN
