= C-COR =

Cable TV equipment company

C-COR (former NASDAQ symbol CCBL) was an American communication services company incorporated in 1953 as CECO and based in State College, Pennsylvania until late 2007, when it was sold to ARRIS. The corporation was best known for creating video transport systems.

In 1953, it was the first to introduce cable powering which transmits power through coaxial cables for powering cable amplifiers. 1965, C-COR introduced the use of integrated circuits in amplifiers used on utility poles and in 1969 was the first to use heat fins on amplifiers.

From the 1990s until its sale, C-COR's business focus moved from hardware amplifiers to communications service and software such as video on demand and cable television advertising insertion. In October 2004, Optinel Systems, Stargus, Alopa Networks, and Lantern Communications. By 2005, C-COR purchased five software companies: video on demand solution provider nCUBE In 2006, as part of a 225 person layoff, C-COR closed the Sunnyvale, California home of acquired Alopa Networks and Lantern Communications.
