= Salt & Straw =

Ice cream company in Portland

Coordinates: 45°31′44.3″N 122°41′54.3″W

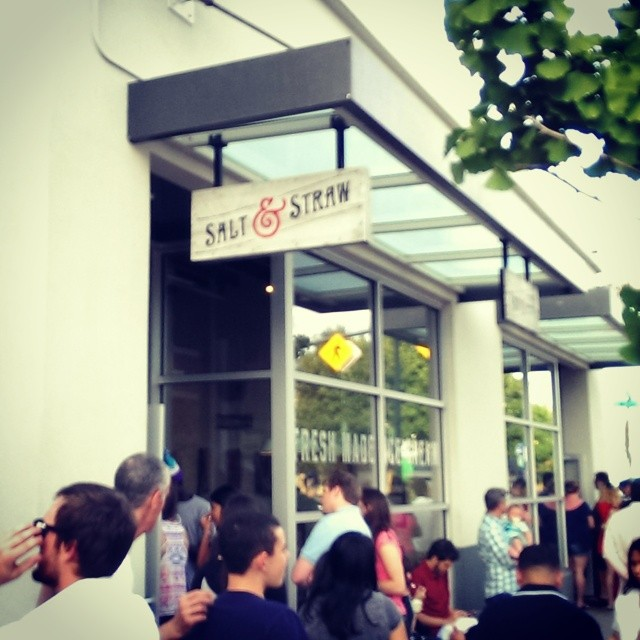
- Industry: Retail
- Founded: 2011; 15 years ago in Portland, Oregon, US
- Founders: Kim Malek; Tyler Malek
- Number of locations: 50 (2025)
- Products: Ice Cream
- Website: saltandstraw.com

Salt & Straw is an American ice cream company based in Portland, Oregon. The chain was founded in 2011 by cousins Kim Malek and Tyler Malek. As of 2025, Salt & Straw has locations in eight states.

== History and description ==
Salt & Straw began as a food cart in the Alberta Arts District of Portland, Oregon. Three months later the company opened its first brick-and-mortar location. Since opening in 2011, Salt & Straw has opened other locations in the Portland area and offers a home delivery service throughout the US. In order to ship ice cream nationwide delivery, the company packs its ice cream in dry ice and kraft paper.

In 2014, US vice president Joe Biden made a surprise visit to Salt & Straw with US senator Jeff Merkley.

Salt & Straw is partially owned by film star and wrestler Dwayne Johnson. It has locations in both Disneyland and Disney World. Salt & Straw is also the exclusive ice cream partner of Alaska Airlines. In 2022, Salt & Straw introduced edible perfume as an ice cream enhancement, which can be sprayed onto scoops.

In May 2025, Food & Wine reported that Salt & Straw’s annual Upcycled Food Series has now diverted over 40,000 lb (18,100 kg) of food waste since its launch in April 2022. This includes ingredients like date seed coffee substitutes and whey-based "wheyskey."

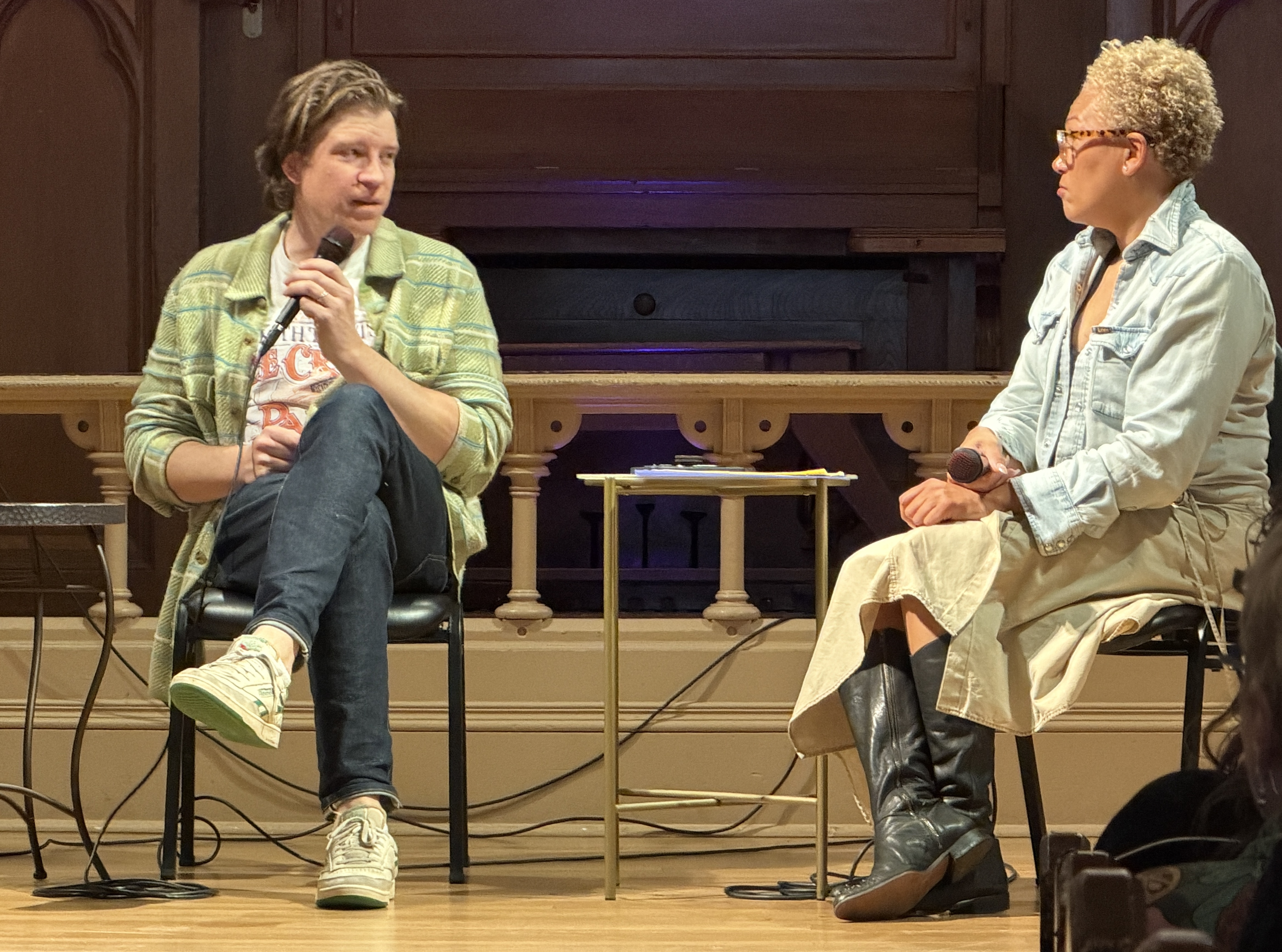
Tyler Malek of Salt and Straw talks to moderator Kimiko Matsuda at the Portland Book Festival on November 8, 2025.

Co-founder Tyler Malek wrote a book, America’s Most Iconic Ice Creams released in April 2025, in which he writes about his philosophy behind ice cream making. The book notes that Malek and the scoop shops are known for classic-feeling flavors like double fold vanilla (plus some incredible but bonkers-sounding flavors like Gruyere and tomato custard tart) and the book explores that methodology.

== Locations ==
Salt & Straw has locations throughout eight states. As of 2026, locations exist in:

- Oregon
  - Portland
  - Eugene
  - Lake Oswego
- California
  - Anaheim
  - Los Angeles
  - Sacramento
  - San Diego
  - San Francisco
  - San Ramon
  - Santa Rosa
  - Pasadena
- Florida
  - Lake Buena Vista (Orlando)
  - Miami
- New Hampshire
  - Salem
- Nevada
  - Las Vegas
- New York
  - New York City
- Texas
  - Dallas
  - Fort Worth
- Washington
  - Vancouver
  - Seattle
  - Bellevue
- Utah
  - Herriman

== Flavors ==
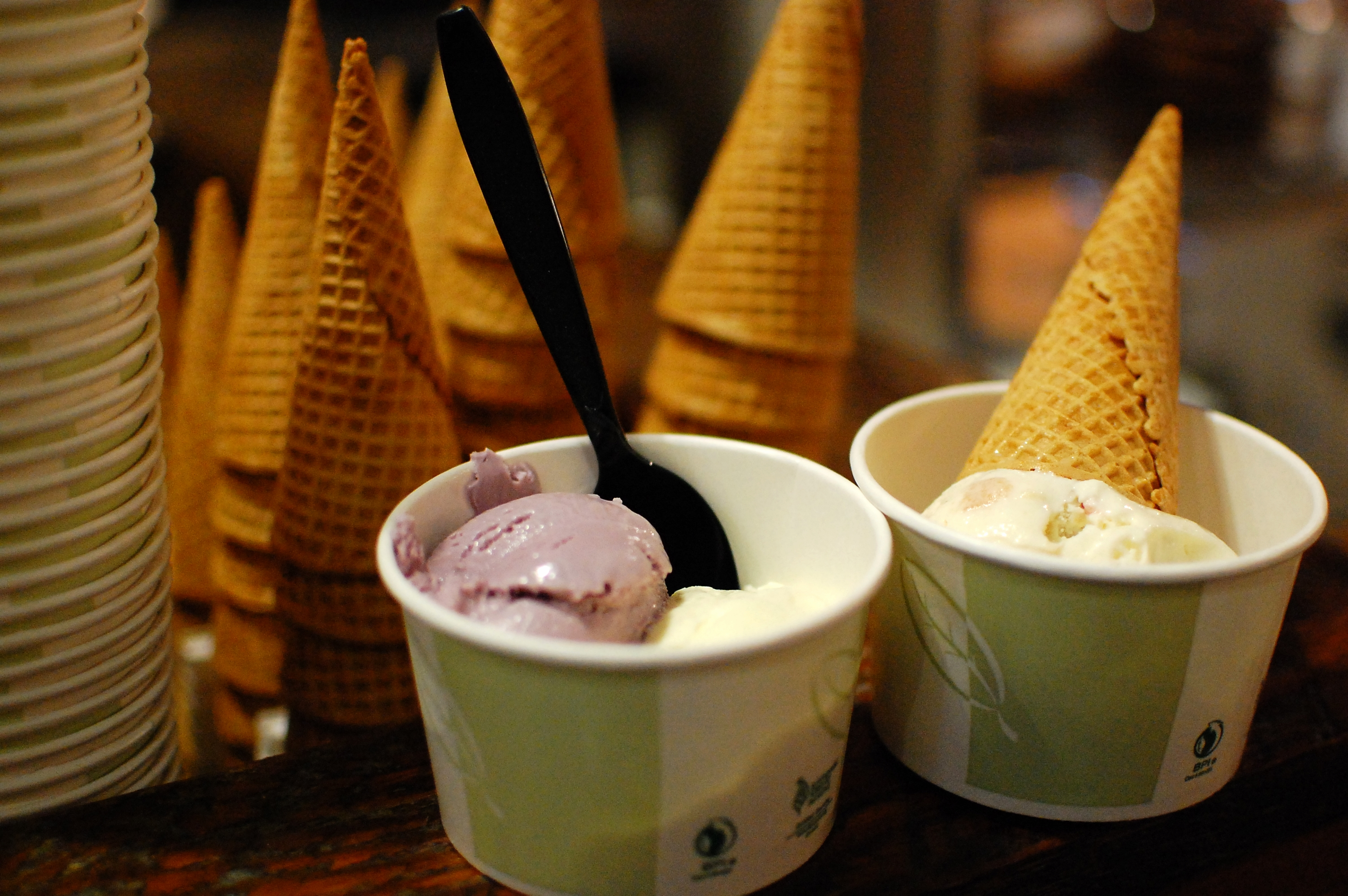
Salt & Straw ice cream

Since opening, Salt & Straw has gained national media attention for its ice cream flavors, some of which are seasonal. Flavors including Bone marrow with Bourbon Smoked Cherries and Arbequina Olive Oil, are one reason Salt and Straw has been included on lists of America's best ice cream.

In 2015, Salt & Straw partnered each shop with different elementary schools to create flavors designed by children. Stop, Guac & Roll (avocado-vanilla ice cream with cinnamon-sugar-dusted fried tortillas) and Honey Bear (vanilla custard with chocolate honeycomb candy and edible glitter) were two of the flavors created.

In 2016, Salt & Straw developed new flavors from food waste: edible by-products of the food production process. New flavors were made with overripe strawberries, spent brewing grains and near-expiration date vegan mayonnaise. Proceeds from the sales of the featured flavors from its Portland stores ($3,000) were donated to Urban Gleaners, a Portland nonprofit. Salt & Straw creates little food waste or scraps, because its products are frozen. When an item is no longer offered on its menu, any leftover ice cream is donated to a nonprofit.

== Reception ==
Salt & Straw won in the Best Ice Cream category of Willamette Week's annual 'Best of Portland' readers' poll in 2015, 2017, 2018, 2020, 2022, 2025, and 2026. The business ranked second in the same category in 2024.

== See also ==
- List of restaurant chains in the United States
