= Ixia (company) =

US computer networking company

- Type: Division
- Traded as: Nasdaq: XXIA
- Industry: Computer networking Wireless networking Security testing Network management Telecommunications
- Founded: 1 January 1997
- Headquarters: Calabasas, California, United States
- Products: See product listing
- Revenue: $464 million (2014) $467 million (2013) $412 million (2012) $308 million (2011)
- Number of employees: 1,700+
- Parent: Keysight
- Website: www.ixiacom.com

Ixia was a public computer networking company operating in around 25 countries until its acquisition by Keysight Technologies Inc. in 2017. Ixia was headquartered in Calabasas, California and had approximately 1,750 employees.

Ixia's customers included manufacturers of network equipment such as Cisco and Alcatel-Lucent, service providers such as Verizon, NTT and Deutsche Telekom, and enterprises and government agencies.

== History ==
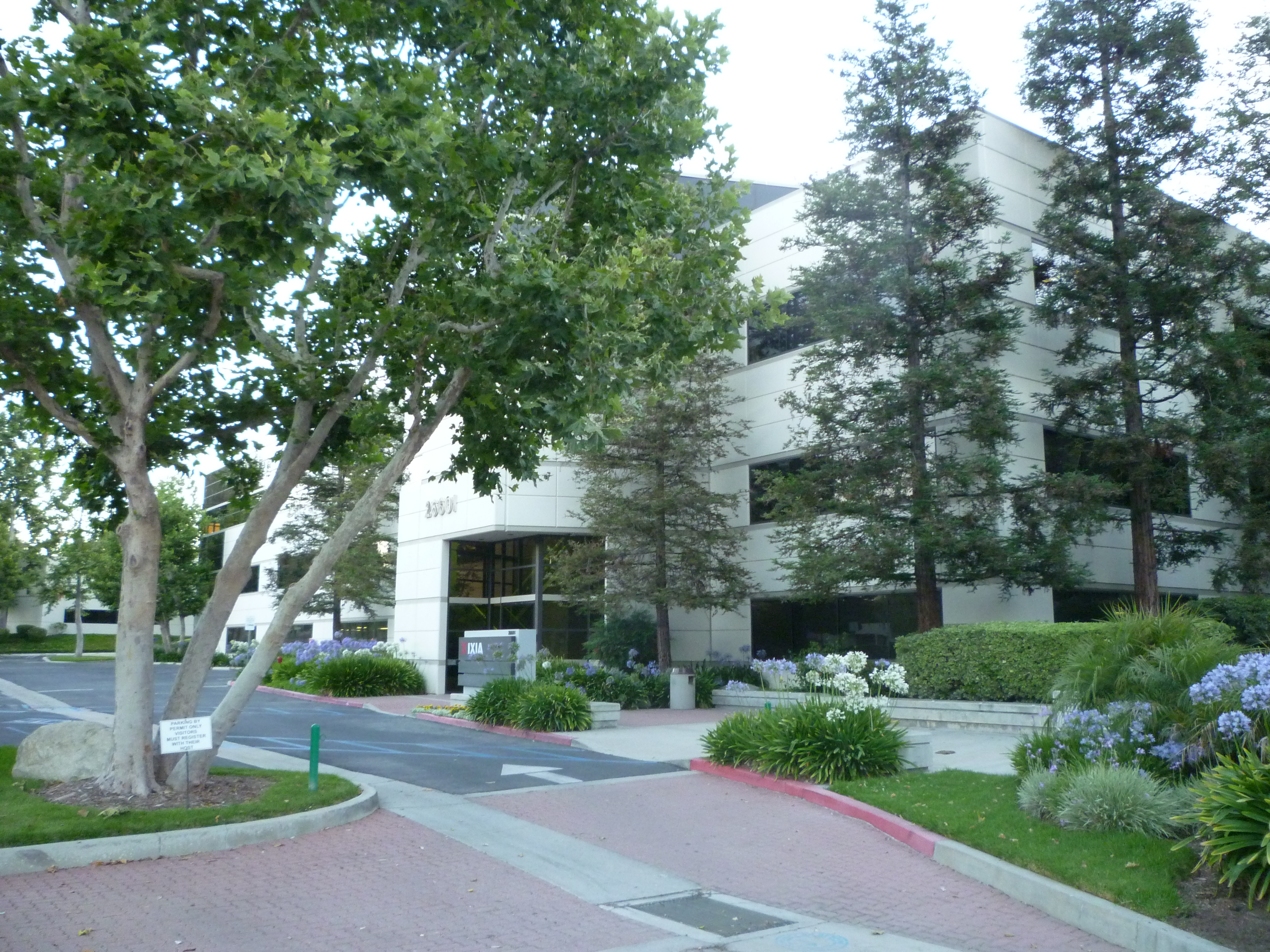
Ixia Headquarters, Calabasas, California

Ixia was founded by Errol Ginsberg and Joel Weissberger in 1997. Atul Bhatnagar succeeded Ginsberg as president and CEO in 2007. On March 19, 2012, Ixia announced Victor Alston as president and chief executive, with Ginsberg remaining chairman. In October 2013, Ixia announced Victor Alston's resignation as chief executive, and he was replaced by Ginsberg as acting CEO. On August 21, 2014, the board named Bethany Mayer president and CEO. Mayer was also named to the board of directors.

Historically an IP/Ethernet testing house, the acquisition of Catapult Communications in June 2009 established Ixia as a player in the Wireless market. Ixia made a second acquisition in 2009, buying Agilent Technologies' N2X Data Networks Product Line for $44 million. Ixia further expanded its testing capabilities by acquiring Wi-Fi testing company VeriWave, Inc. in July, 2011. On June 4, 2012, Ixia announced the completion of the acquisition of Anue Systems, Inc., a developer of network visibility software and tap aggregation products founded by Kevin Przybocki, Hemi Thaker, and Chip Webb. On August 24, 2012, the company announced another acquisition, BreakingPoint Systems, a company in network security testing. Ixia continued its acquisitions by announcing the purchase of Net Optics on October 29, 2013.

In 2017, Keysight Technologies Inc. acquired Ixia for about $1.6 billion in cash. The company's test and simulation platforms are used by network equipment manufacturers, service providers, enterprises, and government agencies to design and validate a wide range of wired, Wi-Fi and 3G/4G networking equipment and networks.

=== Net Optics ===
Net Optics was a manufacturer of network monitoring equipment for physical and virtual networks. The company was established in 1996 by Eldad Matityahu. Ixia announced the purchase of Net Optics on October 29, 2013. Net Optics produces equipment includes taps, bypass switches, regeneration taps, aggregators, data monitoring switches, and media converters. Net optics does both production and manufacturing in the united states.

Net Optics was founded in 1996 by Eldad Matityahu. The company’s original focus was producing network taps - hardware devices that monitor network traffic. It then offered a range of network monitoring services for telecommunications, banking, finance, government and large enterprise.

In January 2012, Net Optics acquired Triplelayer, a private Australia-based distributor, and its sister company, nMetrics, which specializes in network and application analysis software. The company’s Network Performance Monitoring products provide statistics/analysis using deep packet inspection.
