= Oregon Entrepreneurs Network =

The Oregon Entrepreneurs Network (OEN) is the largest entrepreneur assistance organization in the state of Oregon. As such, this not-for-profit organization provides resources and support for emerging, growth-oriented companies in Oregon and the Pacific Northwest.

== Programs ==
The OEN provides a number of programs to help their members:

Startup Services Designed to help entrepreneurs plan their businesses and execute said plans. These include evaluation of long-term potential for business concepts; seminars on business plan development; review of business plans with a team of experts; and training and review of presentations with a panel of professional investors and service providers.

Executive Education Series —A sixteen-part series to help entrepreneurs and founding executives with such ideas as "Go-to-market Strategies," "Building sales strategy, process and people," and "Developing financials, projections and valuations."

OEN Online Community—An online platform hosting blogs, discussions, and resources for entrepreneurs. It also serves as a forum for members to raise concerns, ask questions, and exchange comments on topics related to the business community.

Pub Talk —An informal program of presentations by startups looking for feedback in a non-threatening venue—a pub. Held the second Wednesday of each month except in July and December.

SwapMeet —A new program held quarterly around the Portland area. Created specifically for people looking to connect with entrepreneurs, early-stage companies, and the people who help them both grow. As the Oregon economy continues to develop, there will be more and more opportunity to work with, work for, or start new companies in growing industries.

Portland Angel Network and Women's Investment Network—Private angel investor groups which meet regularly to see presentations from companies looking for investors.

Angel Oregon —AO is a day-long conference, and is the premier education, investment, and networking event in the Northwest, for angel investors and early-stage entrepreneurs. The education component focuses on how angel investing works, due diligence, etc. The investment component features companies who are chosen after having gone through an application and screening process, making their pitch to investors.

2009 OEN Angel Oregon finalist

- DesignMedix: Develops drugs to combat drug resistance in multiple diseases.
- GadgetTrak: Theft-recovery software to protect mobile devices from theft or loss. Works with Mac notebooks, iPhones and iPods.
- Glide Cycle: Makes a mobility device for those with disabilities or other conditions that would otherwise prevent them from running.
- Tau Science Corp.: Designs and manufactures diagnostic tools for solar production
- WeoGeo: Online tools for survey, engineering, mapping, and architectural content.
- Wicked Quick: Clothing and accessories available at Nordstrom, Metropark, Harley Davidson Dealerships, among other retailers.

Venture Northwest —Venture Northwest (formerly Venture Oregon) is an annual conference that draws institutional investors and investment bankers from across the Western U.S. who are interested in emerging Northwest businesses and the region's growth segments.

OEN Tom Holce Awards for Entrepreneurship —An annual evening of celebration for the Pacific Northwest's entrepreneurs. Award categories are:

- OEN Development Stage Company of the Year
- OEN Working Capital Stage Company of the Year
- OEN Growth Stage Company of the Year
- OEN Entrepreneurship Award for Individual Achievement

Entrepreneurs Bus Tour -– This quarterly program launched in the spring of 2006. No more than 10 early-stage entrepreneurs are put in a van, and taken to the business location of two different, very experienced, serial entrepreneurs. OEN invites early-stage entrepreneurs to hop into a bus to visit the business locations of two different, very experienced, Northwest CEOs. Entrepreneurs will receive a brief tour of the business facility and spend about an hour and a half with each CEO, learning about this entrepreneur's road to success and their lessons learned.

CEO Roundtable -– Join in on one of OEN's CEO Roundtables to discuss business strategies; current challenges; how to build a team; how to raise capital; and what distribution channels make the most sense for growing a Northwest business. An experienced CEO will facilitate the discussion. For more information, see the OEN's comprehensive program list.

== History ==
Formerly the Oregon Entrepreneurs Forum (OEF), the Oregon Entrepreneurs Network was started in 1991 as one of 20 worldwide chapters of the Massachusetts Institute of Technology (MIT) Enterprise Forum (Enterprise Forum). Known at the time as the Oregon Enterprise Forum, the organization merged in 1997 with the Oregon Young Entrepreneurs Association.

== See also ==
- Portland Business Journal
- Portland State University School of Business Administration
- Portland Monthly
- SCORE Association
- Angel investing
