= Imperial Bottle Shop & Taproom =

Bar in Portland, Oregon, U.S.

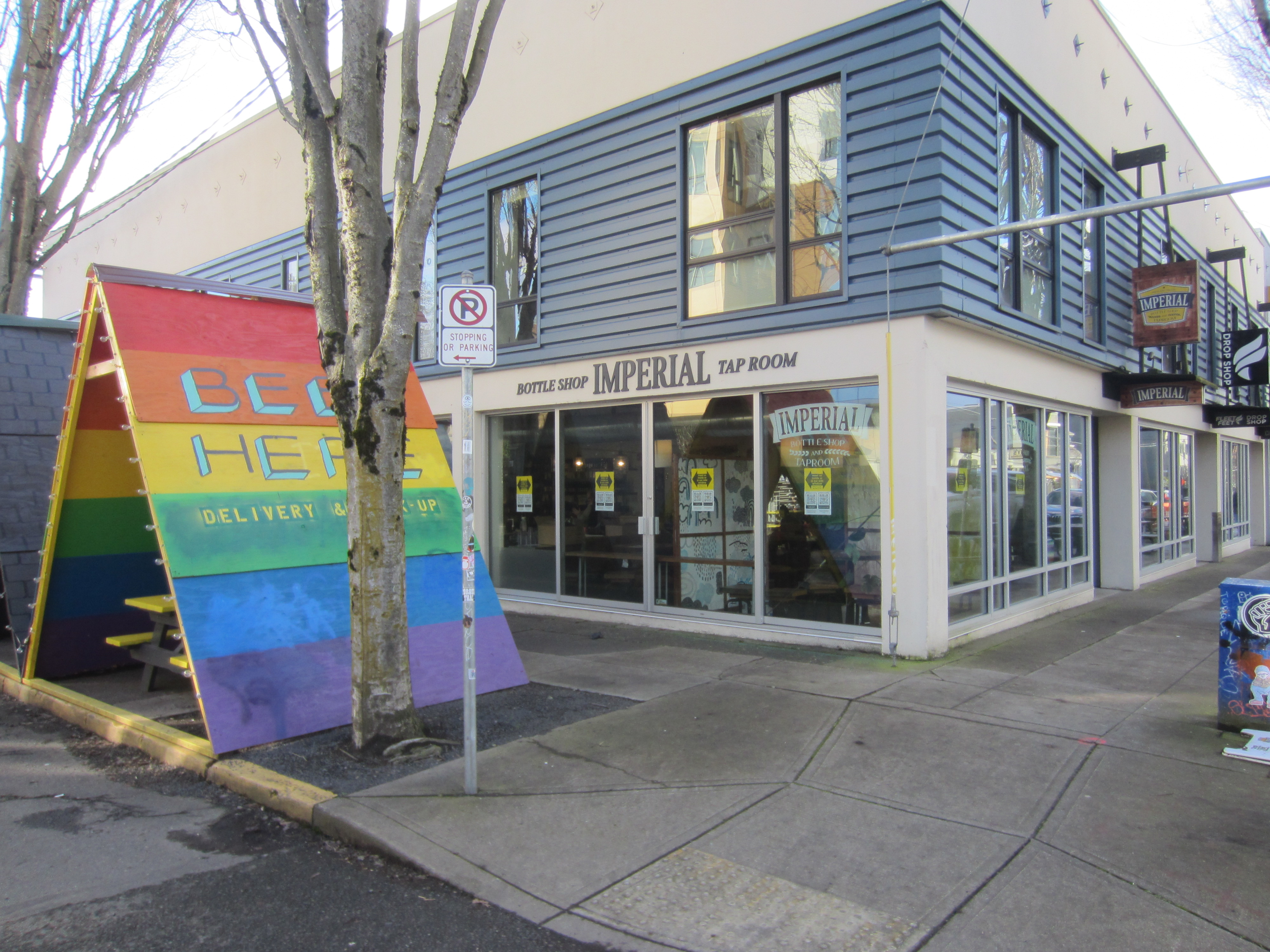
- Exterior of the original location in Portland, Oregon's Richmond neighborhood, 2021
- Interactive map of Imperial Bottle Shop & Taproom

Restaurant information
- Established: July 2013
- Owners: Alex Kurnellas; Shawn Stackpoole
- Location: 3090 Southeast Division Street, Portland, Multnomah, Oregon, 97202, United States
- Coordinates: 45.5047°N 122.6337°W

Imperial Bottle Shop & Taproom is a bar in Portland, Oregon. Spouses Alex Kurnellas and Shawn Stackpoole opened the original location in southeast Portland in July 2013, followed by a second in northeast Portland in 2017. The business serves local brews on tap, and bottled for take-out.

Imperial operated the pop-up GlüBar in 2020 and 2021, serving beers, ciders, mulled wine, and baked goods. The outpost closed in March 2022, citing challenges associated with the COVID-19 pandemic and a cancer diagnosis in the owners' family. The business has been recognized by the Oregon Beer Awards.

== Description ==
Imperial Bottle Shop had 16 local brews on tap and approximately two hundred bottles to go, as of 2013. Thrillist has said, "Fill up one of their stainless-steel growlers to take home or wait five minutes for them to chill a bottle that you can drink at their bar." In 2014, Grant Butler of The Oregonian wrote, "With large windows facing Division, it's the perfect place for people watching while waiting for a table at Pok Pok. On tap are 16 local beers, and if that's not enough, there are more than 100 bottled beers, including a strong selection of homegrown IPAs." Fodor's has said the bar occupies "a sleek, contemporary corner space" on Division and offers "connoisseur-worthy" microbrews.

== History ==
Spouses and co-owners Alex Kurnellas and Shawn Stackpoole opened the original bar, which occupies 1,347 square feet of retail space in the D-Street Village building on Division Street in southeast Portland's Richmond neighborhood, in July 2013. Upon opening, patrons could have food delivered from nearby Sunshine Tavern. In 2017, a second location opened in a former Mercado Don Pancho on Alberta Street in northeast Portland's Vernon neighborhood, with approximately 30 taps, arcade games, and bottles for purchase.

In 2020, during the COVID-19 pandemic, the original location delivered beer locally from Wednesday to Sunday from 2 to 6 p.m. It operated a weekend community plaza featuring local artists, using a special license issued by the City of Portland, during the pandemic. The business has openly supported the Black Lives Matter movement, however the southeast Portland location was vandalized in July 2020 during the George Floyd protests. Outdoor seating returned at both locations by September 2020.

In 2022, plans were announced to close the Vernon location, citing challenges associated with the pandemic and a cancer diagnosis in the family. The bar closed on March 19.

=== Events ===
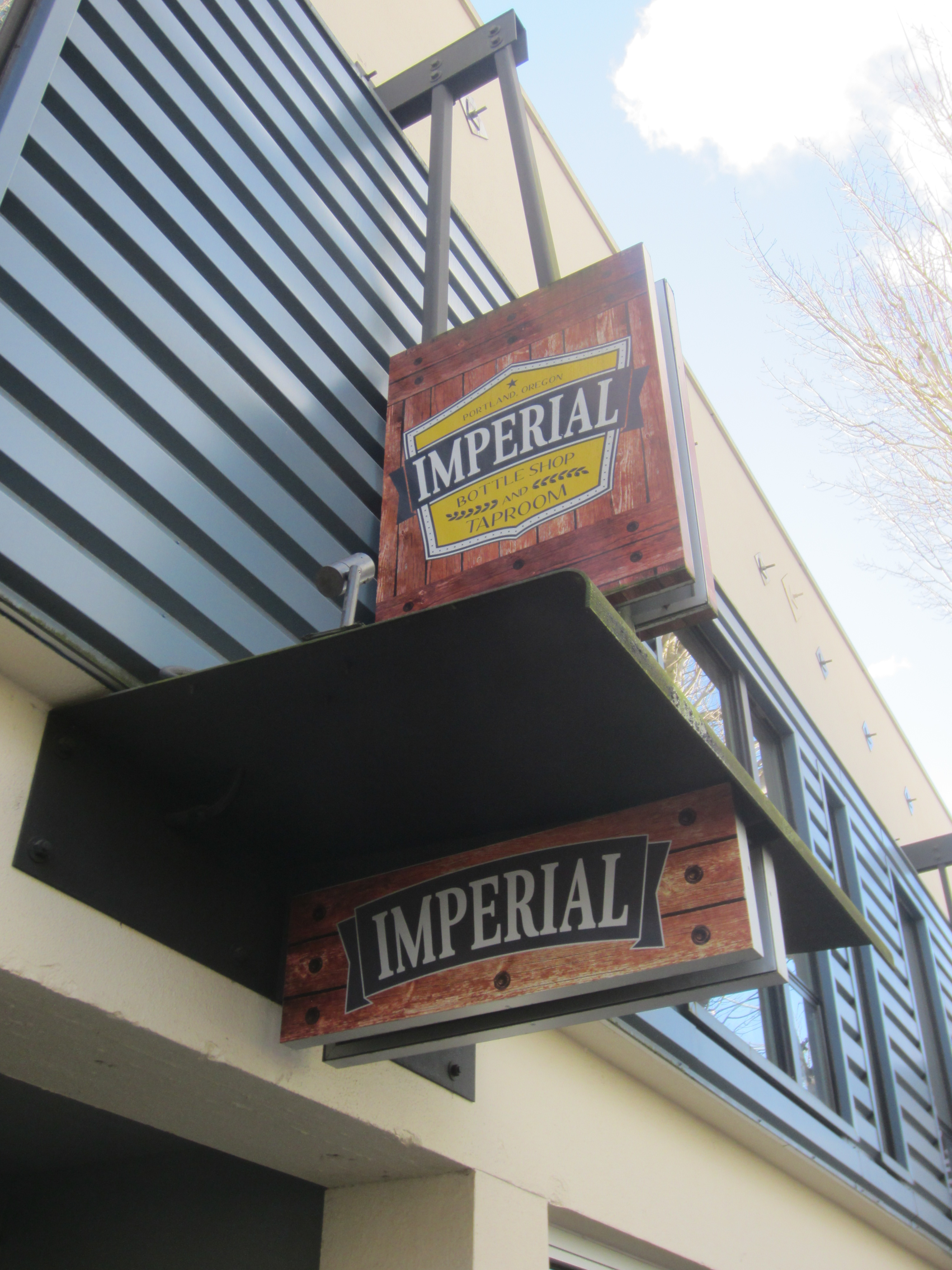
Exterior sign, 2021

The bar participated in the Nouveau Division Crawl to celebrate Beaujolais nouveau wine in 2015. The Vernon location collaborated with Fremont Brewing in 2018, offering discounted sampler trays to people dressed as Santa Claus as part of the Santacon Sing-Along Spectacular. For New Year's Eve in 2021, the Vernon location hosted the Globetrotter's Ball, ringing in the new year eleven times, "every hour on the hour across the globe". Imperial has also hosted an annual Star Wars Day celebration, screening films from the franchise and serving themed beers.

=== GlüBar ===
On December 16, 2020, Imperial began hosting the pop-up GlüBar outside the Vernon location, serving beers, ciders, mulled wine, and baked goods. Mulled drinks changed weekly, using barley wines, sours, and stouts as bases. The Yule Log was prepared tableside with Founders KBS chocolate coffee oatmeal stout, marshmallows, peppermint tincture, and a stick of cinnamon, before being set ablaze. The Fruitcake Delight was made of barleywine mulled with ginger, cinnamon, nutmeg, and turbinado sugar, and garnished with rum-soaked currants and raisins. The glühwein was made of pinot noir from Coopers Hall Winery and Taproom mulled with anise, cinnamon, and turbinado sugar, and garnished with clove. GlüBar also served 2 Towns Ciderhouse's Nice & Naughty Imperial Spiced Cider, garnished with clove and lemon, as well as Momokawa Sake mulled with clove, honey, and orange, and served with a jasmine tea bag infusion.

GlüBar returned in 2021. Drinks included a Bold Leaf pinot noir mulled with anise, cinnamon, and clove, a Crux's Freakcake Sour with cinnamon, ginger, and nutmeg, and a Deschutes's Abyss imperial stout turned into a peppermint cocoa by steeping the beer with Ghirardelli and candy canes. Katrina Yentch included GlüBar in Eater Portland's 2021 list of "12 Places to Sip Cheery, Warm Holiday Cocktails in Portland".

== Reception and recognition ==
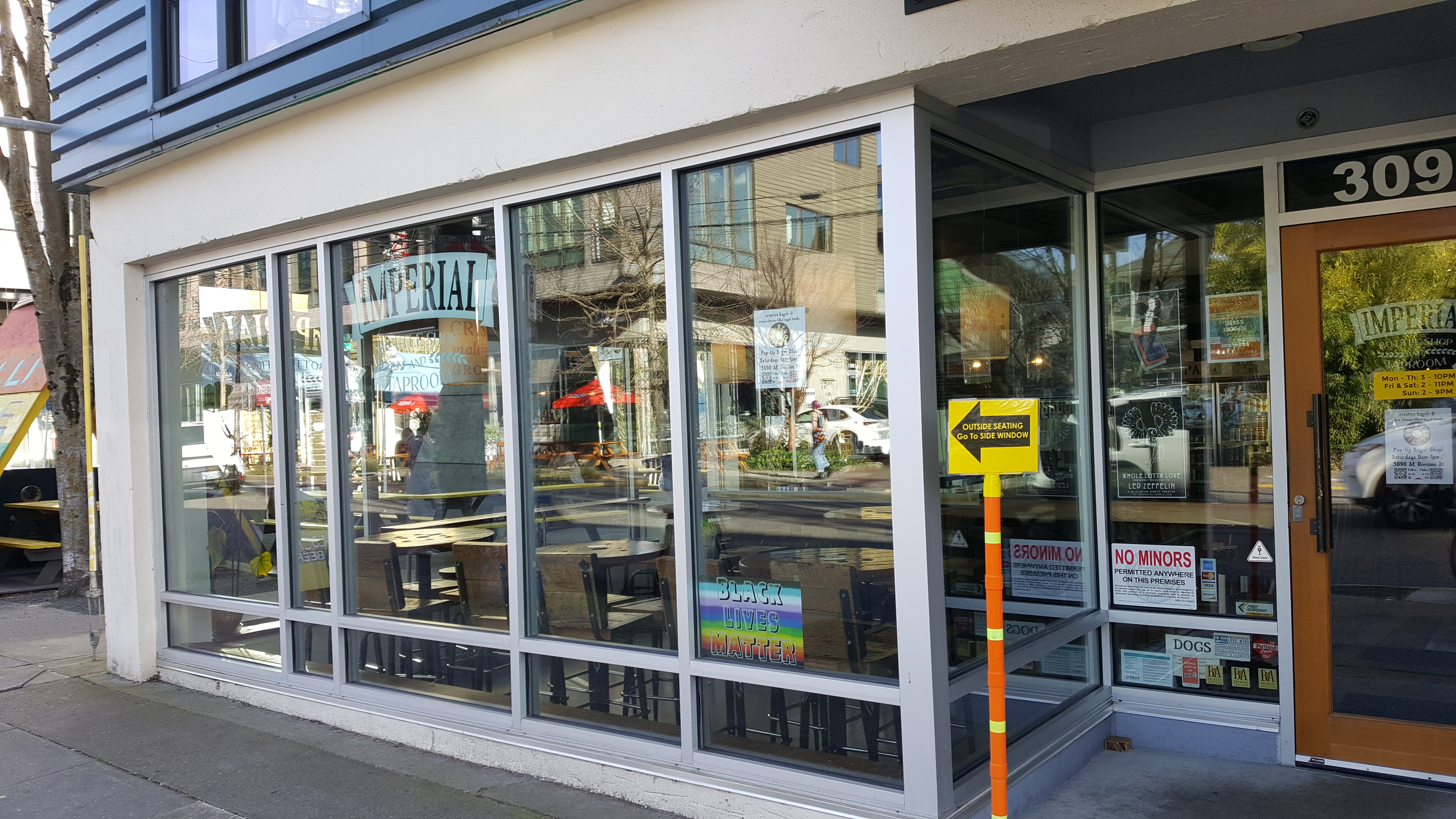
Exterior of the Richmond bar, 2022

In 2013, Ned Lannamann of the Portland Mercury described the original location as a "welcoming new hangout... and a worthwhile addition to the almost incomprehensibly huge eating and drinking scene on SE Division". He said "the choices (including two ciders) are consistently excellent". In 2014, Willamette Week said, "Imperial is the first beer bar in town to employ a Wine Well to chill shelved bottles, a welcome innovation next to the familiar digital beer board, jazz soundtrack, heavy wood seating and an IPA-heavy tap list." The newspaper included Imperial in a 2021 overview of "favorite patios for day-drinking" and the business was a runner-up in the Best Bottle Shop category of Willamette Week's annual 'Best of Portland' readers' poll in 2022.

CNN Travel and Thrillist have included Imperial in lists of businesses which make Portland a leading city for beer. The business has been recognized by the Oregon Beer Awards; Imperial was nominated in the Best Beer Bar/Bottle Shop category in 2019, and tied for Best Pandemic Pivot in 2021.

== See also ==
- Brewing in Oregon
- COVID-19 pandemic in Portland, Oregon
- Impact of the COVID-19 pandemic on the restaurant industry in the United States
- List of restaurant chains in the United States
