= Apex (bar) =

Beer bar in Portland, Oregon, U.S.

- Interactive map of Apex

Restaurant information
- Established: 2010
- Owner: Jesse McCann
- Location: 1216 Southeast Division Street, Portland, Multnomah, Oregon, 97202, United States
- Coordinates: 45.5047°N 122.6534°W
- Website: apexbar.com

Apex (sometimes Apex Bar) was a beer bar in Portland, Oregon. Jesse McCann opened the bar in southeast Portland's Hosford-Abernethy neighborhood in 2010. The cash-only and bicycle-friendly business has dozens of beer on tap, a large patio, and pinball machines. Apex is popular and has garnered a positive reception. It is slated to stop operating at its current location in August 2024, as the lease was not renewed.

== Description ==
The beer bar Apex operates at the intersection of 12th Avenue and Division Street in southeast Portland's Hosford-Abernethy neighborhood. The cash-only business has a tap list of approximately 50 beers, a large patio and an outdoor cigar bar, as well as bicycle parking. It does not serve food or allow children. The renovated industrial interior has a long bar and pinball machines in the foyer.

Willamette Week has said: "Apex is Portland's least provincial beer bar, pulling in killer beers from all over ... rather than just close to home, with a selection not only geographically broad but vertically deep: Four-year tappings are common enough they're sometimes unannounced. It's also Portland's hugest roadside beer patio and its most adamantly cash-only bar. It's one of the bike-friendliest, if not always the friendliest." Sunset magazine has called Apex "a go-to for rare beers served with care". Apex has poured beer from Gigantic, Hair of the Dog, and Hamm's.

== History ==
Jesse McCann opened Apex in 2010, in the space that previously housed Lovecraft Biofuels. In 2015, Apex hosted an event to celebrate Fremont Brewing's launch in Portland, pouring ten of its beers.

In 2024, Apex's future became unknown when the lease was not renewed. An announcement posted to social media on June 30 said, "Just when things were starting to feel like they're returning to a pre-COVID vibe, we're on the hunt for a new home." Operations at the current location will end in late August.

== Reception ==
Andy Kryza included Apex in Thrillist's 2015 list of the nation's 33 best beer bars. The website's 2018 "beer drinker's ultimate guide" to Portland said: "Apex offers a staggering array of beer styles in an unpretentious environment that's bolstered by a huge, packed patio open year-round. Whether it's obscure German or Belgian brews, barrel-aged imperial stouts, or delicate saisons that you crave, this ... porch is a perennial crowd-pleaser that's amenable to people bringing in outside food. And this is excellent news as it sits in one of Portland's best neighborhoods for dining out."

Willamette Week's 2017 overview of the city's best patios, porches, and rooftops said Apex offered "the best and most crowded beer patio in all of Portland". The newspaper's Nigel Jaquiss said Apex was popular in 2022. The business won in the Best Beer Selection on Tap category of Willamette Week's annual readers' poll in 2015, and was a runner-up in the same category in 2022.

== See also ==
- Brewing in Oregon
