= Keeper Coffee =

Coffee company in the U.S. state of Oregon

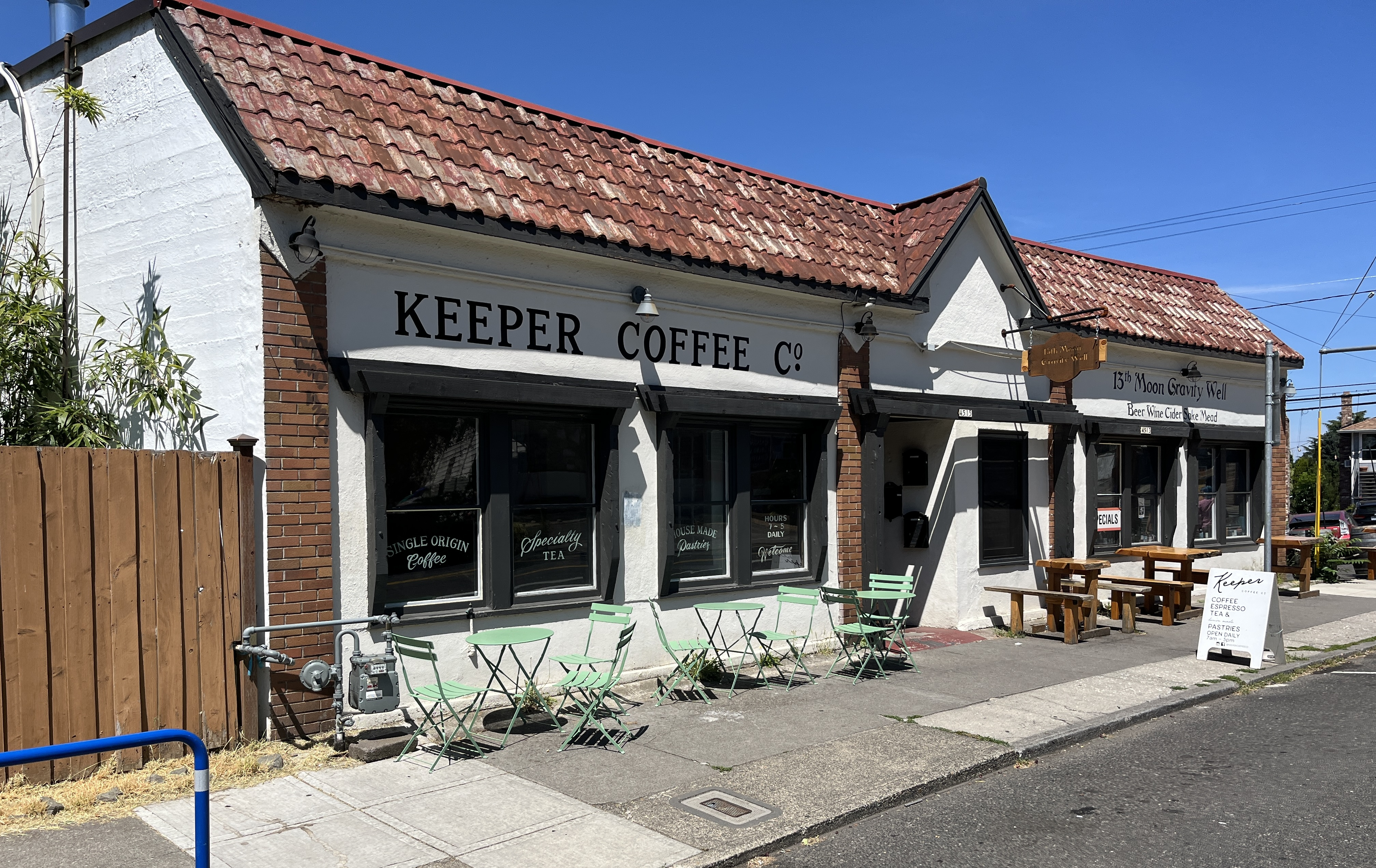
- Exterior of the original location in Portland, Oregon, 2025
- Interactive map of Keeper Coffee

Restaurant information
- Established: 2020
- Location: 4515 Southeast 41st Avenue, Portland, Multnomah, Oregon, 97202, United States
- Coordinates: 45.4900°N 122.6200°W
- Website: keepercoffee.com

Keeper Coffee Co. is a coffee company in the U.S. state of Oregon. It was established in 2020. The business operates two cafes in the Portland metropolitan area; the original location is in southeast Portland's Woodstock neighborhood and an outpost is in Milwaukie's Old City Hall.

== Description ==
Keeper operates two coffee shops in the Portland metropolitan area. The original storefront is on 41st Avenue near the intersection with Holgate in the northwest corner of southeast Portland's Woodstock neighborhood, near the border with the Creston-Kenilworth neighborhood. A second location operates with an expanded food menu on Southeast Main in Milwaukie's Old City Hall, alongside a brewpub operated by PFriem Family Brewers.

According to Eater Portland, the coffee shop in Woodstock is "housed in a quaint building that feels largely unchanged since its 1920s construction", has "cottagecore vibes", and is popular among Reed College students and people working remotely. The website has also said the shop has marble tables and vintage wooden chairs, appearing "like something out of Kinfolk". The Portland Mercury said the Milwaukie location "is thoughtfully designed to cater to those trying to grab-and-go along with those who are setting up shop for the day to get some computer work done".

=== Menu ===
The menu includes coffee and espresso drinks such as cappuccinos, cortados, lattes, and macchiatos, as well as teas. Keeper uses beans from Coava Coffee Roasters. Food options include granola and baked goods such as a raspberry-rosemary scone, orange olive oil cake, peach hand pies, lemon lavender loafs, and rose pistachio shortbread. Keeper has also served breads such as brioche and focaccia, pecan sticky buns, marionberry and cream galette, quiches, and sandwiches. Its Harvest Moon syrup has sweetened condensed milk, cardamom, cinnamon and vanilla bean. Keeper offers gluten-free and vegan pastries. The expanded menu at the Milwaukie location offer breakfast and lunch options.

== History ==
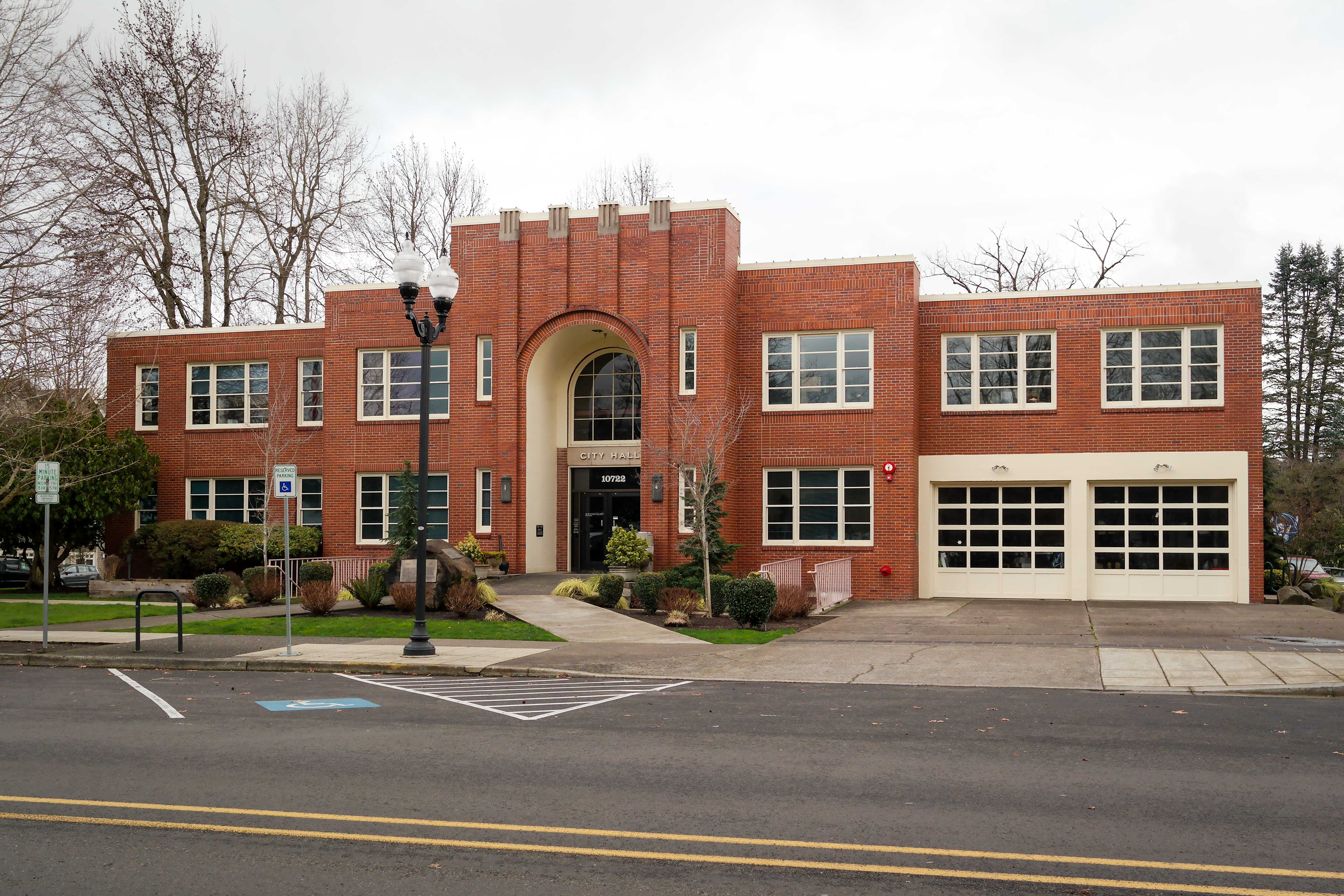
The Milwaukie location operates in Old City Hall (exterior pictured in 2015)

Keeper opened in 2020. Morgan Eckroth represented Keeper and was a winner at the United States Barista Championship in 2022.

The Milwaukie outpost opened in April 2025. When PFriem began operating in the same building, it served a Belgian Strong Dark beer made with Keeper. Keeper and PFriem also collaborated for Portland's ninth annual Coffee Beer and Doughnut Festival in 2025.

== Reception ==
Portland Monthly included Keeper in a 2023 "definitive guide" to the city's best independent coffee shops. Nathan Williams and Janey Wong included the business in Eater Portland's 2023 list of recommended eateries in Woodstock. In his 2024 overview of recommended eateries in Creston-Kenilworth, Williams wrote, "Keeper Coffee maintains about a surprisingly low profile for a coffee shop that boasts the national champion barista of 2022 and national runner-up of 2023. Despite the stellar coffee ... and top-notch baked goods, Keeper remains a comfortable place for unrushed afternoons or laptop mornings." The website's Paolo Bicchieri included the business in a 2025 list of Portland's best coffee shops. In 2025, Nolan Parker of the Portland Mercury said Keeper had some of the city's best pastries.

== See also ==
- List of coffeehouse chains
