= Ferment Brewing Company =

Brewery in Hood River, Oregon, U.S.

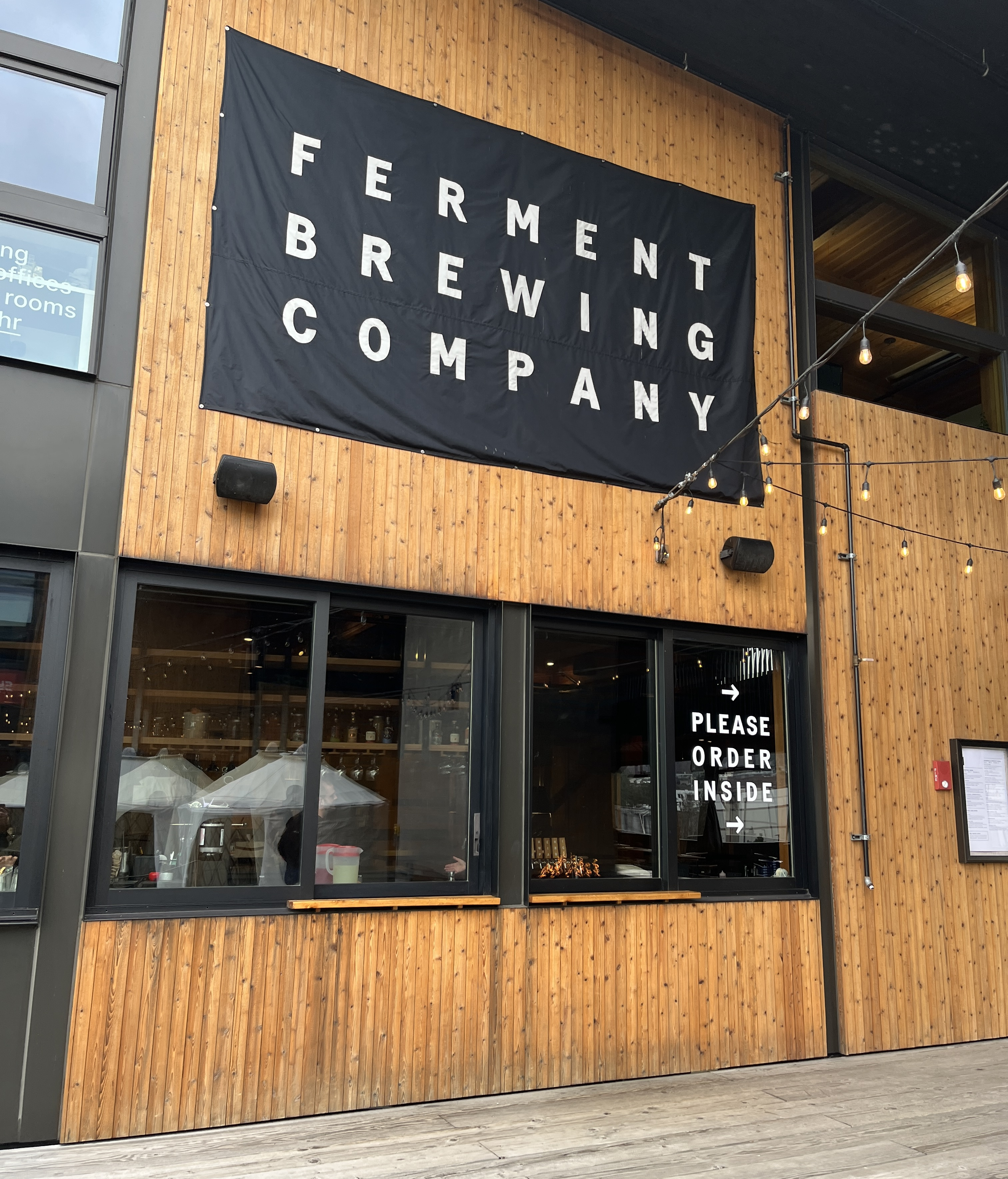
- Interactive map of Ferment Brewing Company

Restaurant information
- Location: Hood River, Oregon, United States
- Coordinates: 45.7147°N 121.5141°W
- Website: fermentbrewing.com

Ferment Brewing Company is a brewery in Hood River, Oregon, United States. It was established in 2018.

The brewery operates across from Hood River Waterfront Park. In addition to beer, the business produces kombuchas and also serves ciders, cocktails and mocktails, and wine. The food menu includes appetizers, salads, sandwiches, salt and vinegar French fries with kombucha ketchup, as well as pickled vegetables. Ferment has also served falafel bahn mi, soft pretzels with miso cream cheese dip, and Nilgiri black tea kombucha.

Ferment uses "old-school farmhouse" techniques and has been recognized by the Oregon Beer Awards.

== See also ==
- Brewing in Oregon
