= Brewing in Oregon =

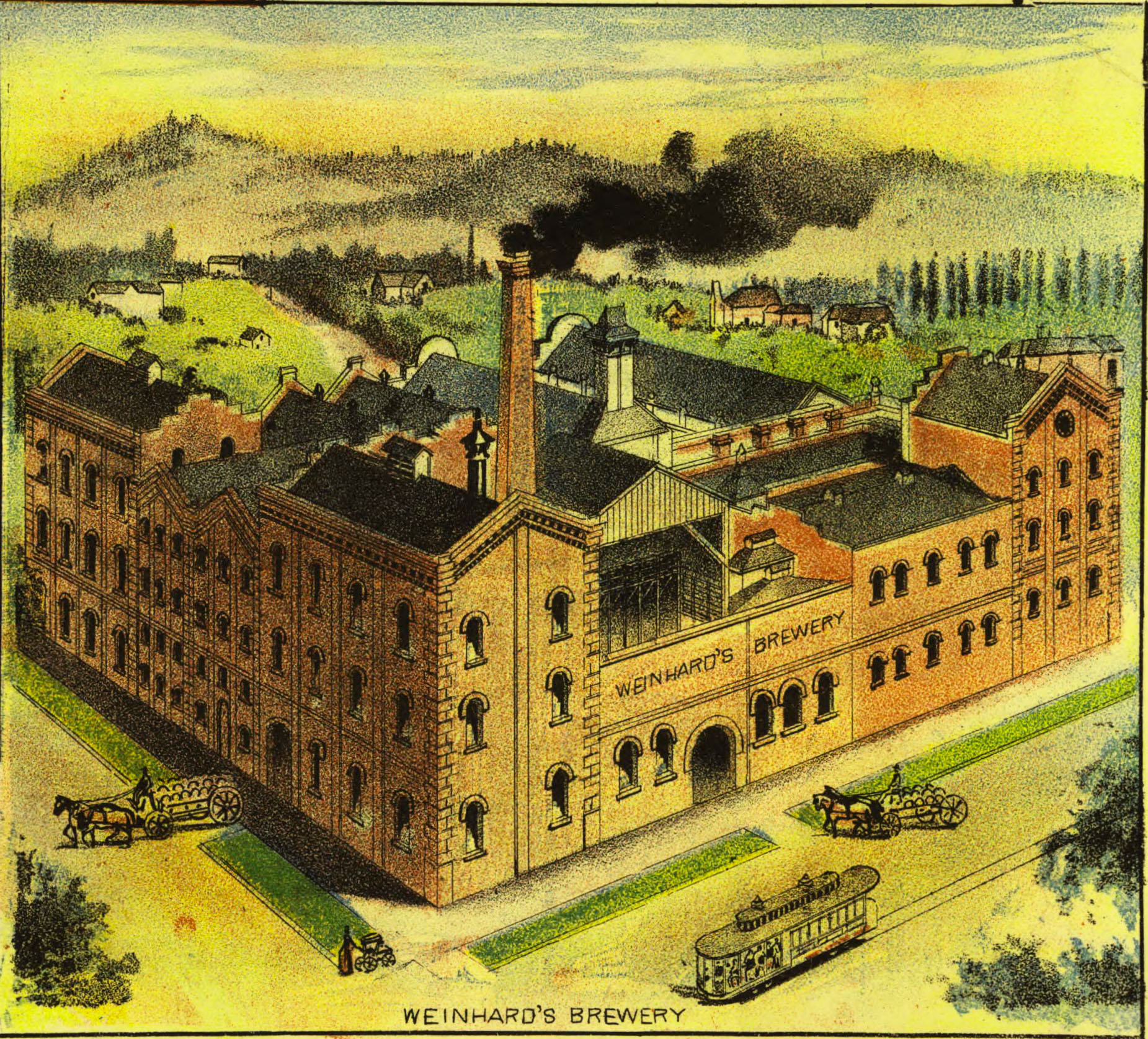
Weinhard's Brewery, Portland, 1890

The U.S. state of Oregon is home to more than 200 breweries and brew pubs that produce a large variety of beer.

== History ==
Many sources credit Swiss-born Henry Saxer and his Liberty Brewery as being Oregon's first commercial brewery (supposedly opening in 1852); however, the first verifiable record of a brewery in Oregon is an advertisement in the August 5, 1854, issue of The Weekly Oregonian for Charles Barrett's Portland Brewery and General Grocery Establishment.

- 1862 – After working at and later owning several smaller breweries, Henry Weinhard purchased and expanded Liberty Brewery which was later renamed City Brewery.
- 1914 – Five years before national prohibition was established, the voters of Oregon approved a statewide ban on the manufacture, sale or advertisement of intoxicating liquor.
- 1933 – Oregon and the nation ratified the 21st Amendment.
- 1985 – Oregon Legislature legalized brewpubs.

According to a 2014 report by the Beer Institute, Oregon had 208 breweries, a number exceeded by only three states – California (with 509 breweries), Washington (251), and Colorado (217). As of July 2015, Oregon was home to 234 brewing facilities operated by 194 brewing companies. There are also many nanobreweries in Oregon. Many breweries have won nationwide and international acclaim.

Alongside brewing, hops have a historical presence in Oregon. Hop production in Oregon began in 1867 when William Wells planted his first crop in Buena Vista, Oregon. This grew throughout the 20th century, when Oregon was dubbed the "Hop Center of the World" for its production around Independence, Oregon, in Polk County. Hop production later saw some decline due to mildew and mechanical picking technology; however, Oregon remains the second largest hop producing state in the US.

Oregon State University began planting and experimenting with hops as early as 1893. Dr. Alfred Haunold influenced modern and popular hop varieties through his work with food studies. The Fermentation Science Program established itself in 1995 and further aided the study of hops and brewing at Oregon State, followed by the creation of the Oregon Hops and Brewing Archives in 2013.

The Oregon Brewers Guild was established in 1992 to promote Oregon breweries; it is the second-oldest nonprofit brewer trade association in the United States.

== Breweries ==
The following are some Oregon-based breweries. The list includes some large brewing companies that have regional or national distribution. Oregon also has many mid-size and small breweries. Most of them produce kegs of beer to be served on draft at taverns and restaurants. Many of them also package their beer in bottles or cans. Some production breweries have taprooms where patrons can drink the beer that is produced onsite. And some breweries are brewpubs – full-service restaurants that brew their own beer.

- 10 Barrel Brewing Company – bottles, cans, and brewpub locations in Bend and Portland, as well as Boise, Denver, and San Diego; founded in 2006; bought by Anheuser-Busch in 2014.
- Alesong Brewing & Blending – Lorane; bottles, tasting room; founded in 2015
- Ancestry Brewing – opened in 2016, brewery and taproom in Tualatin, restaurant in Portland
- Barley Brown's Beer – Baker City – brewpub, and production brewery with taproom; founded in 1998
- Block 15 Brewing Company – Corvallis – bottles; brewpub opened in 2008; production brewery and taproom opened in 2015
- Boneyard Beer – Bend; tasting room; opened in 2010
- Breakside Brewery – bottles; brewpub in Northeast Portland (opened in 2010), brewery and taproom in Milwaukie (2013), and brewpub in Northwest Portland (2017)
- Buoy Beer Company – Astoria; bottles, brewpub; opened in 2014
- Captured by Porches Brewing – Saint Helens
- Cascade Lakes Brewing Company – bottles; brewpubs in Redmond and Bend; founded in 1994
- Claim 52 Brewing – Eugene; cans, taproom, brewpub; founded in 2012
- Coldfire Brewing – Eugene; bottles, cans, brewpub; opened in 2016
- De Garde Brewing – Tillamook; bottles, taproom; opened in 2013
- Deschutes Brewery – Bend, Portland; bottles, brewpubs; founded in 1988
- Double Mountain Brewery – bottles; taprooms in Hood River and Portland; founded in 2007
- Falling Sky Brewing – Eugene; brewery, taproom, founded in 2012
- Ferment Brewing Company
- Fort George Brewery – Astoria; cans, brewpub; opened in 2007
- Full Sail Brewing Company – Hood River; bottles, brewpub; founded in 1987
- Gigantic Brewing Company – Portland; bottles, brewpub; opened in 2012
- Gilgamesh Brewing – Salem; bottles, brewpub; opened in 2009
- Great Notion Brewing – Portland; brewpub, opened in 2016
- Hop Valley Brewing Company – Eugene, founded in 2009
- Hopworks Urban Brewery – Portland; founded in 2007, SE Powell pub opened in 2008, Vancouver pub opened in 2017.
- Laurelwood Pub and Brewery – Portland; founded in 2001
- Little Beast Brewing – Clackamas (brewery); Portland (beer garden); bottles, brewpub; founded in 2017
- McMenamins – a brewpub chain with locations throughout Oregon and Washington; founded in 1983
- Ninkasi Brewing Company – Eugene; bottles, taproom; founded in 2006
- Oakshire Brewing – Eugene; bottles, cans; founded in 2006
- Old Town Brewing – Portland; bottles and pizzeria brewpub; original restaurant opened in 1974, brewpub opened in 2012
- Ordnance Brewing – Wilsonville; cans, taproom, opened in 2014
- Pelican Brewing Company – bottles; brewpubs in Pacific City and Cannon Beach, taproom in Tillamook; founded in 1996
- pFriem Family Brewers – Hood River; bottles, brewpub; opened in 2012
- Plank Town Brewing – Springfield; bottles, brewpub; founded in 2013
- The Prodigal Son Brewery and Pub – Pendleton; brewpub, opened in 2010
- Rogue Ales – Newport; founded in 1988; bottles, cans; brewpubs in Oregon, Washington, and California
- Stickmen Brewing Company – Lake Oswego; bottles/cans, brewpubs in Lake Oswego and Tualatin, founded in 2013
- Upright Brewing – Portland; opened in 2009; bottles, taproom
- Viking Braggot Company – Eugene; bottles, taprooms; opened in 2013
- Wayfinder Beer – Portland; brewpub, opened in 2016
- Widmer Brothers Brewery – Portland; founded in 1984, Widmer Brothers is now part of Craft Brew Alliance
- Wolves & People Farmhouse Brewery – Newberg; bottles, taproom, opened in 2016
- Worthy Brewing – Bend; cans, brewpub; founded in 2013

=== Notable closed breweries ===
- BridgePort Brewing Company – Portland; bottles, brewpub; founded in 1984; acquired by the Gambrinus Company in 1995;
- Burnside Brewing Company
- Hair of the Dog Brewing Company – Portland; bottles, brewpub; founded in 1993
- Henry Weinhard's, formerly of Portland, is now owned and brewed by SABMiller, although some beers are brewed under contract by Full Sail Brewing Company. The Weinhard Brewery Complex is now a mixed-use development.
- Portland Brewing Company – Portland; bottles, brewpub; founded in 1986; bought by Pyramid Breweries in 2004; acquired by Florida Ice and Farm Company in 2012; closed in 2021.
- Rogue Ales – Newport; draft, canned and bottled beer, spirits, CBD seltzers, canned cocktails and sodas; Multiple brewpub locations; Filed Chapter 7 Bankruptcy November 24th, 2025 and was found to be $16.7 million dollars in debt after 37 years of business.

== Festivals ==
The Oregon Brewers Festival the largest gathering of independent craft brewers in the United States. The Gold Beach Brew & Art Festival is always held the Saturday after Labor Day. It is the oldest brew festival in southern Oregon and on the Oregon Coast. Other beer festivals include the Portland International Beerfest and SheBrew.

== Homebrewing ==
F. H. Steinbart is a homebrew supply store on SE 12th Avenue in Portland, Oregon. It is the oldest homebrew supply store in the country and helped nurture the vibrant Pacific Northwest craft-brewing scene. President Jimmy Carter signed HR 1337 into law in 1978, which legalized homebrewing at the federal level. In the years that followed, many commercial brewers began as homebrewer customers who were introduced to the company by buying supplies there – the Widmers and McMenamins brothers were customers.

Owner John DeBenedetti helped establish the Oregon Brew Crew in 1980; it is Oregon's largest active homebrew club and meets monthly in the FH Steinbart warehouse.

== Awards ==
=== World Beer Cup ===
==== Brewery Awards ====
(Discontinued in 2018)

Year	Award	Brewery	Brew Master	City
2016	Champion Brewery (Very Small)	Arch Rock Brewing Co.	James Smith	Gold Beach
2014	Champion Brewery (Small)	Pelican Brewery	Darron Welch, Steve Panos	Pacific City
2012	Champion Brewpub (Large)	Pelican Pub & Brewery	Darron R S Welch	Pacific City
2008	Champion Brewpub (Small)	Bend Brewing Company	Tonya Cornett	Bend
2004	Champion Brewpub (Small)	Laurelwood Pub & Brewery	Christian Ettinger	Portland

==== Awards ====
Year	Award	Brew Name	Brewery	Category
2018	Bronze	Disorder	Barley Brown's Brew Pub	American-Style Stout
2018	Silver	Breakside Wanderlust IPA	Breakside Brewery & Taproom	American-Style Strong Pale Ale
2018	Bronze	BayWatch	Elk Horn Brewery	American-Style Wheat Beer with Yeast
2018	Gold	Breakside Lunch Break ISA	Breakside Brewery & Taproom	Australian-Style Pale Ale or International-Style Pale Ale
2018	Silver	Doggerland	Oakshire Brewing	Baltic-Style Porter
2018	Gold	Nectarine Golden Ale	pFriem Family Brewers	Belgian-Style Fruit Beer
2018	Gold	Baywindow	10 Barrel Brewing Co. – Bend	Berliner-Style Weisse
2018	Bronze	Fantastic Voyage	Gigantic Brewing Co.	Brett Beer
2018	Silver	FivePine Chocolate Porter	Three Creeks Production	Brown Porter
2018	Gold	Shanghai'd IPA	Old Town Brewing	English-Style India Pale Ale
2018	Silver	Breakside Old World IPA	Breakside Brewery & Beer Hall	English-Style India Pale Ale
2018	Bronze	Orbiter IPA	Ecliptic Brewing	English-Style India Pale Ale
2018	Gold	Beaverton Blonde	Golden Valley Brewery	English-Style Summer Ale
2018	Gold	Sn4 Cuvée	Logsdon Farmhouse Ales	Experimental Beer
2018	Silver	Passionate Envy	10 Barrel Brewing Co. – Bend Pub	Fruit Wheat Beer
2018	Silver	IPA No. 5	Ground Breaker Brewing	Gluten-Free Beer
2018	Gold	67 Blonde Ale	Public Coast Brewing Co.	Golden or Blonde Ale
2018	Gold	Pilsner	Old Town Brewing	Historical Beer
2018	Gold	Good, Not Great	StormBreaker Brewing	Imperial Red Ale
2018	Silver	ZuurPruin	Logsdon Farmhouse Ales	Mixed Culture Brett Beer
2018	Silver	McKay's Scottish Ale	Three Creeks Brewing Co.	Scotch Ale
2018	Gold	Double Stack	Great Notion Brewing	Specialty Beer
2018	Gold	Queen of Hearts	Pelican Brewing Co. – Pacific City	Wood- and Barrel-Aged Beer
2016	Gold	Turmoil	Barley Brown's Brew Pub	American-Style Black Ale
2016	Gold	Pistol River Pale	Arch Rock Brewing Co.	American-Style Pale Ale
2016	Bronze	DAM Wild – Hops and Lemon Verbena	Flat Tail Brewing Co.	American-Style Sour Ale
2016	Gold	Fuzztail	Sunriver Brewing	American-Style Wheat Beer with Yeast
2016	Bronze	Lost Meridian Wit	Base Camp Brewing Co.	American-Style Wheat Beer with Yeast
2016	Silver	Breakside Lunch Break ISA	Breakside Brewery	Australian- or International-Style Pale Ale
2016	Bronze	Stormwatcher's Winterfest	Pelican Brewing Co. – Pacific City	Barley Wine-Style Ale
2016	Silver	Raise the Roost	Portland Brewing	Belgian-Style Pale Ale or Blonde Ale
2016	Gold	Capella Porter	Ecliptic Brewing	Brown Porter
2016	Silver	Hellcat	Fort George Brewery + Public House	Chili Beer
2016	Gold	Caldera Ashland Amber	Caldera Brewing Co.	Classic English-Style Pale Ale
2016	Bronze	Breakside ESB	Breakside Brewery – Pub Brewery	Classic English-Style Pale Ale
2016	Bronze	Breakside Will's Alt	Breakside Brewery – Pub Brewery	German-Style Altbier
2016	Gold	Lucubrator	Occidental Brewing Company	German-Style Doppelbock or Eisbock
2016	Gold	Volkssekt	Bend Brewing Co.	German-Style Sour Ale
2016	Silver	Stumblers Stout	Columbia River Brewing Co.	Oatmeal Stout
2016	Bronze	Sasquatch Shadow	Elk Horn Brewery	Oatmeal Stout
2016	Gold	Brilliant	10 Barrel Brewing Co.	Other Strong Beer
2016	Silver	Breakside Smoked Porter	Breakside Brewery – Pub Brewery	Smoke Beer
2014	Gold	Turmoil	Barley Brown's Brew Pub	American-Style Black Ale
2014	Bronze	Flemish Kiss	Commons Brewery (The)	American-Style Brett Beer
2014	Gold	Black Flag Imperial Stout	Beer Valley Brewing Co.	American-Style Imperial Stout
2014	Silver	Block & Tackle Stout	Chetco Brewing Co.	American-Style Imperial Stout
2014	Bronze	Citrus Mistress	Hop Valley Brewing Co.	American-Style India Pale Ale
2014	Bronze	Ching Ching	Bend Brewing Co.	American-Style Sour Ale
2014	Bronze	Power to the People	10 Barrel Brewing – Boise Pub	American-Style Stout
2014	Bronze	DD Blonde	Hop Valley Brewing Co.	American-Style Wheat Beer
2014	Gold	Hefeweizen	Widmer Brothers Brewing Co.	American-Style Wheat Beer With Yeast
2014	Silver	Silverspot IPA	Pelican Brewery	English-Style India Pale Ale
2014	Gold	Mother Lode Golden Ale	Laurelwood Brewing Co.	English-Style Summer Ale
2014	Gold	Cucumber Crush	10 Barrel Brewing Co.	Field Beer or Pumpkin Beer
2014	Silver	I'd Like to Buy the World a Kölsch	Old Town Brewing Co.	German-Style Kölsch/Köln-Style Kölsch
2014	Gold	Kiwanda Cream Ale	Pelican Brewery	Golden or Blonde Ale
2014	Bronze	Paulie's Not Irish Red	Old Town Brewing Co.	Irish-Style Red Ale
2014	Gold	Cerasus	Logsdon Organic Farm Brewery	Other Belgian-Style Ale
2014	Gold	Scottish Ale	Two Kilts Brewing Co.	Scottish-Style Ale
2014	Gold	Pipewrench	Gigantic Brewing	Wood- and Barrel-Aged Beer
2012	Gold	Peche 'n Brett	Logsdon Farmhouse Ales	American-Style Brett Ale
2012	Gold	Ching Ching	Bend Brewing Co.	American-Style Sour Ale
2012	Bronze	DD Blonde	Hop Valley Brewing Co.	American-Style Wheat Beer
2012	Gold	Stormwatcher's Winterfest	Pelican Pub & Brewery	Barley Wine-Style Ale
2012	Bronze	Caldera Ashland Amber	Caldera Brewing Co.	Classic English-Style Pale Ale
2012	Bronze	Breakside Dry Stout	Breakside Brewery	Classic Irish-Style Dry Stout
2012	Silver	Drunken Elf Stout	Columbia River Brewing Co.	Coffee Beer
2012	Bronze	Mother Lode Golden Ale	Laurelwood Brewing Co.	English-Style Summer Ale
2012	Bronze	Urban Farmhouse Ale	Commons Brewery (The)	French- & Belgian-Style Saison
2012	Bronze	Oyster Stout	Upright Brewing Co.	Indigenous Beer
2012	Silver	Stumblers Stout	Columbia River Brewing Co.	Oatmeal Stout
2012	Gold	MacPelican's Scottish Style Ale	Pelican Pub & Brewery	Scottish-Style Ale
2010	Gold	Session Black	Full Sail Brewing Co.	American-Style Dark Lager
2010	Gold	Shredders Wheat	Barley Brown's Brew Pub	American-Style Wheat
2010	Bronze	DD Blonde	Hop Valley Brewing Co.	American-Style Wheat
2010	Silver	Caldera Pilot Rock Porter	Caldera Brewing Co.	Brown Porter
2010	Silver	Organic Velvet ESB	Hopworks Urban Brewery	Extra Special Bitter or Strong Bitter
2010	Bronze	ALT	Widmer Brothers Brewing Co.	German-Style Brown Ale/Duesseldorf-Style Altbier
2010	Bronze	Gose	Upright Brewing Co.	German-Style Sour Ale
2010	Gold	Drop Top	Widmer Brothers Brewing Co.	Ordinary Bitter
2010	Silver	MacPelican's Scottish Style Ale	Pelican Pub & Brewery	Scottish-Style Ale
2010	Gold	Caldera Rauch Ur Bock	Caldera Brewing Co.	Smoked Beer
2010	Silver	Smoke Ale	Rogue Ales	Smoked Beer
2010	Gold	Bachelor Bitter	Deschutes Brewery	Special Bitter or Best Bitter
2010	Gold	Outback X	Bend Brewing Co.	Strong Ale
2008	Gold	Doryman's Dark Ale	Pelican Pub & Brewery	American-Style Brown Ale
2008	Gold	Black Diamond Lager	Bend Brewing Co.	American-Style Dark Lager
2008	Gold	Widmer Hefeweizen	Widmer Brothers Brewing Co.	American-Style Hefeweizen
2008	Bronze	India Pelican Ale	Pelican Pub & Brewery	American-Style India Pale Ale
2008	Gold	Widmer Pale Ale	Widmer Brothers Brewing Co.	American-Style Pale Ale
2008	Gold	Organic IPA	Hopworks Urban Brewery	American-Style Strong Pale Ale
2008	Silver	HUB Organic Lager	Hopworks Urban Brewery	Bohemian-Style Pilsener
2008	Gold	BridgePort Beertown Brown	BridgePort Brewing Co.	English-Style Brown Ale
2008	Bronze	Tsunami Stout	Pelican Pub & Brewery	Foreign (Export)-Style Stout
2008	Gold	Deschutes Brewery Sorghum Beer	Deschutes Brewery	Gluten Free Beer
2008	Silver	Kiwanda Cream Ale	Pelican Pub & Brewery	Golden or Blonde Ale
2008	Silver	Organic Deranger	Laurelwood Brewing Co.	Imperial or Double Red Ale
2008	Silver	BridgePort Blue Heron Pale Ale	BridgePort Brewing Co.	Ordinary Bitter
2008	Gold	Morimoto Soba Ale	Rogue Ales	Specialty Beer
2008	Bronze	Morimota Black Obi Soba Ale	Rogue Ales	Specialty Beer
2008	Gold	Outback X	Bend Brewing Co.	Strong Ale
2006	Bronze	Session Premium Lager	Full Sail Brewing Co.	American Cream Ale or Lager
2006	Bronze	Caldera Dry Hop Red	Caldera Brewing Co.	American-Style Extra Special Bitter or Strong Bitter
2006	Bronze	Pyramid Hefeweizen	Pyramid Alehouse/Breweries Inc	American-Style Hefeweizen
2006	Silver	India Pelican Ale	Pelican Pub & Brewery	American-Style India Pale Ale
2006	Gold	Shakespeare Stout	Rogue Ales	American-Style Stout
2006	Bronze	Pyramid Crystal Weizen	Pyramid Alehouse/Breweries Inc	American-Style Wheat Beer
2006	Gold	Caldera Pilsener Bier	Caldera Brewing Co.	Cellar or Unfiltered Beer
2006	Silver	Kiwanda Cream Ale	Pelican Pub & Brewery	Golden or Blonde Ale
2006	Bronze	Organic Deranger	Laurelwood Public House & Brewery	Imperial or Double Red Ale
2006	Gold	Blue Heron Pale Ale	BridgePort Brewing Co.	Ordinary Bitter
2006	Silver	Morimoto Black Obi Soba Ale	Rogue Ales	Specialty Beer
2004	Gold	Organic Free Range Red	Laurelwood Public House & Brewery	American-Style (Extra Special) Strong Bitter
2004	Gold	Widmer Hefeweizen	Widmer Brothers Brewing Co.	American-Style Hefeweizen
2004	Bronze	Piston Pale Ale	Laurelwood Public House & Brewery	American-Style Pale Ale
2004	Gold	Old Boardhead Barleywine Ale	Full Sail Brewing Co.	Barley Wine-Style Ale
2004	Bronze	Wasco Indian Summer Ale	Alameda Brewing Co.	English-Style India Pale Ale
2004	Gold	Space Stout	Laurelwood Public House & Brewery	Foreign (Export)-Style Stout
2004	Silver	Tsunami Stout	Pelican Pub & Brewery	Foreign (Export)-Style Stout
2004	Gold	Kiwanda Cream Ale	Pelican Pub & Brewery	Golden or Blonde Ale
2004	Silver	Double Deranger	Laurelwood Public House & Brewery	Imperial or Double Red Ale
2004	Bronze	Blue Heron Pale Ale	BridgePort Brewing Co.	Ordinary Bitter
2004	Silver	Organic Tree Hugger Porter	Laurelwood Public House & Brewery	Robust Porter
2004	Silver	Caldera Rauch Ur Bock	Caldera Brewing Co.	Smoke-Flavored Beer
2002	Silver	Doryman's Dark Ale	Pelican Pub & Brewery	American-Style Brown Ale
2002	Gold	Piston Pale Ale	Laurelwood Public House & Brewery	American-Style Pale Ale
2002	Silver	Bridge Port India Pale Ale	BridgePort Brewing Co.	American-Style Pale Ale
2002	Silver	Obsidian Stout	Deschutes Brewery	Foreign Style Stout
2002	Gold	Mother Lode Golden Ale	Laurelwood Public House & Brewery	Golden or Blonde Ale
2002	Gold	Imperial Stout	Rogue Ales	Imperial Stout
2002	Silver	Jubel 2000	Deschutes Brewery	Old Ale
2002	Gold	Smoke	Rogue Ales	Smoke-Flavored Beer
2000	Silver	Doryman's Dark Ale	Pelican Pub & Brewery	American-Style Brown Ale
2000	Silver	Full Sail Old Boardhead Barleywine Ale	Full Sail Brewing Co.	Barley Wine-Style Ale
2000	Bronze	Black Butte Porter	Deschutes Brewery	Brown Porter
2000	Silver	Obsidian Stout	Deschutes Brewery	Foreign Style Stout
2000	Gold	Widmer Springfest	Widmer Brothers Brewing Co.	German-Style Brown Ale/Düsseldorf-Style
2000	Gold	Imperial Stout	Rogue Ales	Imperial Stout
2000	Silver	BridgePort IPA	BridgePort Brewing Co.	India Pale Ale
2000	Silver	Mocha Porter	Rogue Ales	Robust Porter
2000	Bronze	Smoke	Rogue Ales	Smoke Flavored Beers
1998	Silver	Black Butte Porter	Deschutes Brewery	Brown Porter
1998	Gold	Widmer Alt	Widmer Brothers Brewing Co.	German-Style Brown Ale/Düsseldorf-Style
1998	Gold	Smoke	Rogue Ales	Smoke-Flavored Beers (Ales or Lagers)
1996	Bronze	MacTarnahan's Ale	Portland Brewing Co.	American-Style Amber Ale
1996	Silver	Haystack Black	Portland Brewing Co.	Brown Porter
1996	Silver	BridgePort Porter	BridgePort Brewing Co.	Robust Porter

== See also ==
- Alcoholic beverages in Oregon
- Beer in the United States
- Drug policy of Oregon
- List of breweries in the United States
- List of companies based in Oregon
- List of microbreweries
- Lists of Oregon-related topics
- Oregon wine
