= Milwaukie City Hall =

Local government building in Oregon, United States

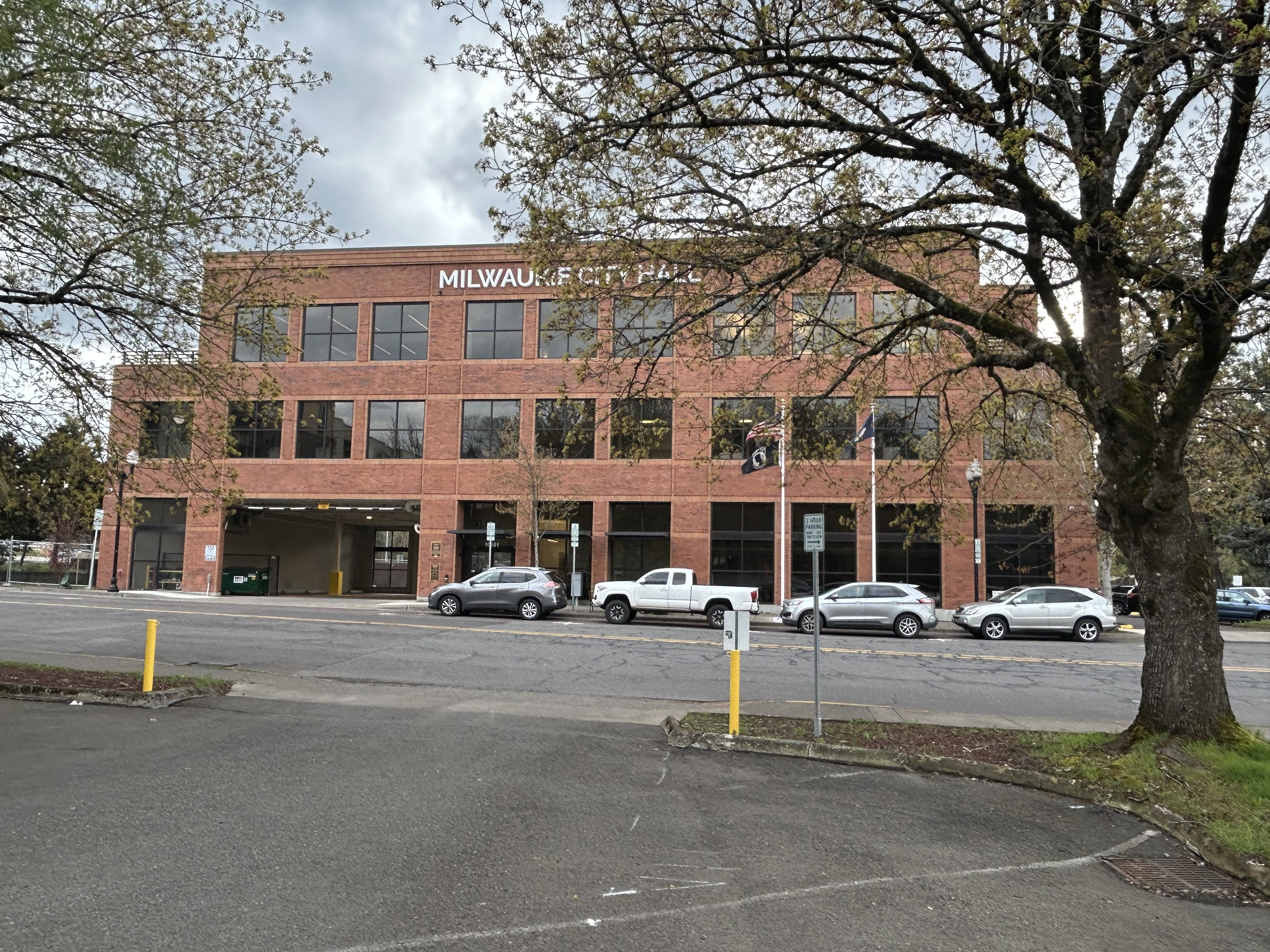
- The building's exterior, 2024

- Location within Oregon

General information
- Location: Milwaukie, Oregon, United States
- Coordinates: 45.44676°N 122.642244°W
- Opened: 2003 (as Credit Union offices); 2023 (as City Hall)

Design and construction
- Architecture firm: Chilless Nielsen + Associates
- Main contractor: R&H Construction

Milwaukie City Hall is the local government headquarters for the city of Milwaukie, Oregon, a suburb of Portland. It replaced the old City Hall in 2023.

== History ==
The building, built in 2003, was named the Electra Building and housed the headquarters of Electra Central Credit Union, which later became Advantis Credit Union after a 2005 merger with PACE Credit Union. It was designed by Chilless Nielsen + Associates Architects and built by R&H Construction, and was officially dedicated on March 17, 2003. The building contains a time capsule which is set to be opened on March 17, 2103.

In 2019, the building was sold to the City of Milwaukie in order to be used as a new city hall, to replace the aging older building that had become too small. Advantis built a new headquarters in nearby Oregon City. The building was remodeled and was topped off with a sign of February 28, 2023. The old City Hall and Johnson Creek Facility were closed on September 13 and the new building officially opened to the public on September 15. The official dedication was held on October 6.

On November 8, 2023, the building was temporarily evacuated due to a bomb threat that was called in at around 2pm. 32 year old Harris Orians was later arrested for the threat and charged with first-degree disorderly conduct and obstructing governmental administration.

In December 2022, it was announced that the old City Hall will be remodeled and turned into a commercial building featuring a brewery, restaurant, bakery, and community art and office space.
