= Oregon Brewers Festival =

Coordinates: 45.516°N 122.6726°W

- The festival in 2007
- Begins: Thursday before last full weekend in July
- Ends: Last Sunday in July
- Frequency: Annual
- Locations: Tom McCall Waterfront Park, Portland, Oregon
- Years active: 1988–2019, 2022, 2024-
- Participants: 85,000 (2014)

Oregon Brewers Festival (OBF) is a four-day craft beer festival held annually from 1988 to 2019 and 2022 at the Tom McCall Waterfront Park in downtown Portland, Oregon, except in 2020-21 when the COVID-19 pandemic and 2023 when low attendance and hot weather from last year caused it to be cancelled. OBF has become the most popular outdoor beer festival in North America, based on attendance. Each brewery brings one beer. The attendance peaked in 2014, however it has been declining since. There is a Root Beer Garden for those who are under 21 or abstain from alcohol.

== History ==
Founder of Portland Brewing Co, Art Larrance, launched the Oregon Brewers Festival in July 1988, after visiting Oktoberfest in Munich and wanting to create a similar atmosphere and experience.

Live music was introduced in 2001.

In 2005, OBF expanded from a three-day schedule (Friday to Sunday) to four, adding Thursday.

The 2011 Oregon Brewers Festival featured 85 craft beers from 14 states; it attracted 80,000 people over four days. Nearly 2,000 volunteers worked at the festival, selling tokens and pouring beer, among other tasks.

In 2013, OBF added a fifth day, moving the opening to Wednesday; they also replaced the annual plastic mug, which had been used since the festival's beginning, with a tasting glass, which for 2013 costs $7. For 2014, there are 88 beers available, in 30 styles; that does not include the more than 100 available separately in OBF's Specialty Tent.

After two years with tasting glasses made of glass, for 2015, OBF switched to a polycarbonate tasting glass; the change was in response to safety concerns raised by the Portland Police.

In 2018, OBF changed back to a four-day festival, moving the opening to Thursday. That same year, the festival added two hard ciders to the lineup, and four wines –– 2 red and 2 white –– for the first time in the festival's history.

In 2020 and 2021, the festival went on hiatus caused by the COVID-19 pandemic; although it resumed in 2022, it was cancelled in 2023.

== Related events ==
In recent years OBF has anchored a month of beer-related festivals in Portland, including the North American Organic Brewers Festival, the Portland International Beerfest, and the Great American Distillers Festival.

== See also ==
- Brewing in Oregon
- Culture of Portland, Oregon
- Portland International Beerfest
- SheBrew
