= 2 Towns Ciderhouse =

Cider producer

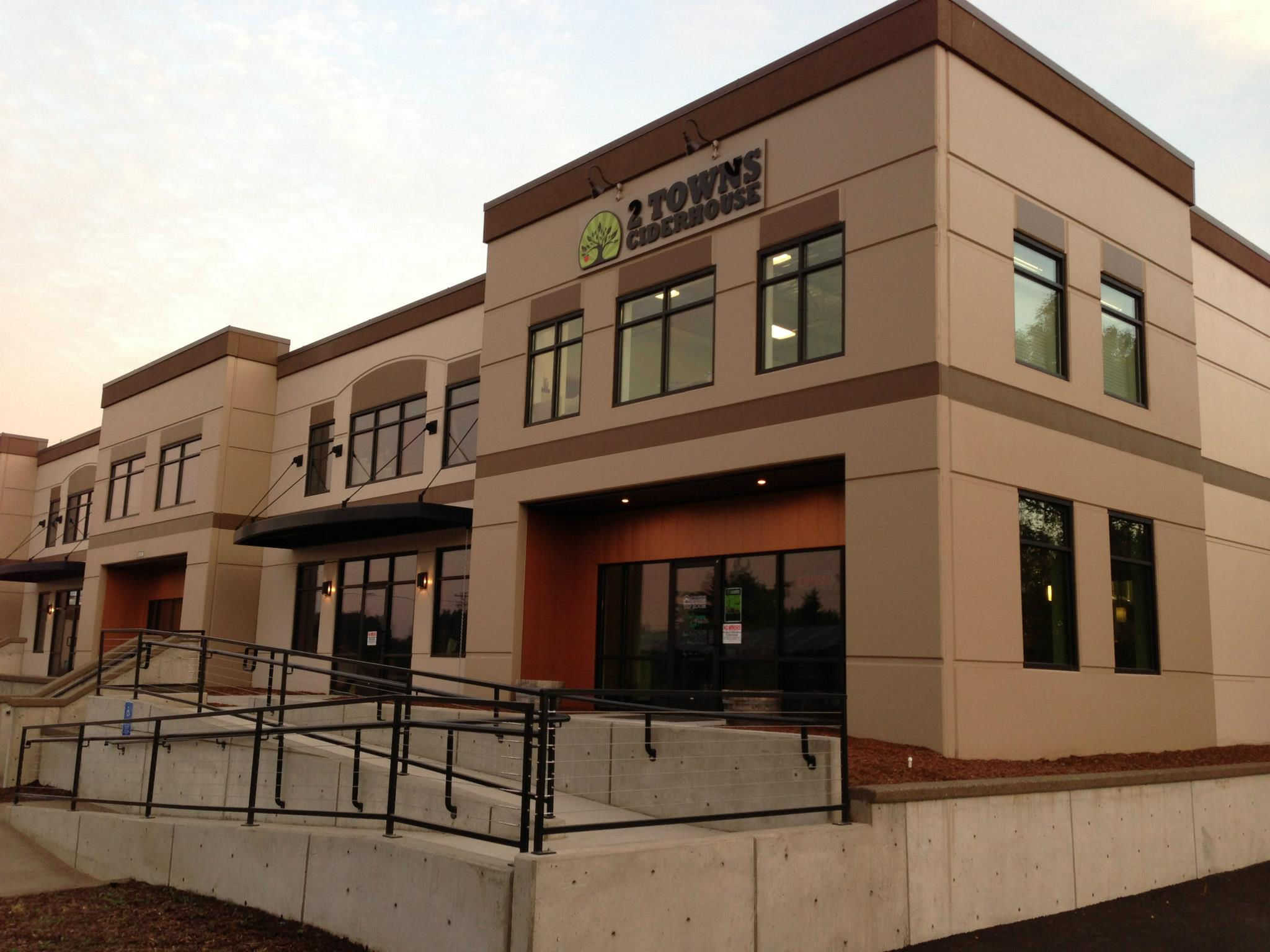
Main building of 2 Towns Ciderhouse.

2 Towns Ciderhouse is an American artisan craft brewery of cider, based in Corvallis, Oregon. Established in 2010, the business produces large quantities of cider each year. The "2 towns" of the name refer to Corvallis and Eugene, Oregon, sites of the two state universities that are alma mater of founders of the brand.

== History ==
=== Establishment ===
2 Towns Ciderhouse, also referred to as 2 Towns, was launched in 2010 by three Oregonians — Lee Larsen, a graduate in finance from Oregon State University, Dave Takush, a fermentation science graduate from the same school, and graphic designer Aaron Sarnoff-Wood, a graduate of the University of Oregon.

Sarnoff-Wood initially wanted to start a brewpub and contacted his friend Larsen, who shared a love for home brewing, to discuss the idea. However, high projected startup costs made this idea impractical, and the concept was abandoned.

The pair became interested in the fermentation of apple cider to create hard cider. A test batch was made to be served in 2009 at Larsen's brother's wedding, which proved extremely popular with guests — and the trio launched a commercial enterprise specializing in the beverage.

2 Towns Ciderhouse was launched in 2010 from a 1,000 square foot space in the Eastgate Business Center, located between Corvallis and Albany, Oregon. Despite the firm's location between the cities of Corvallis and Albany, the brand name was actually a reference to the college towns of Corvallis and Eugene, from which the three founding partners hailed.

The company sold approximately 100 cases a month during its first year of operations.

=== Expansion ===
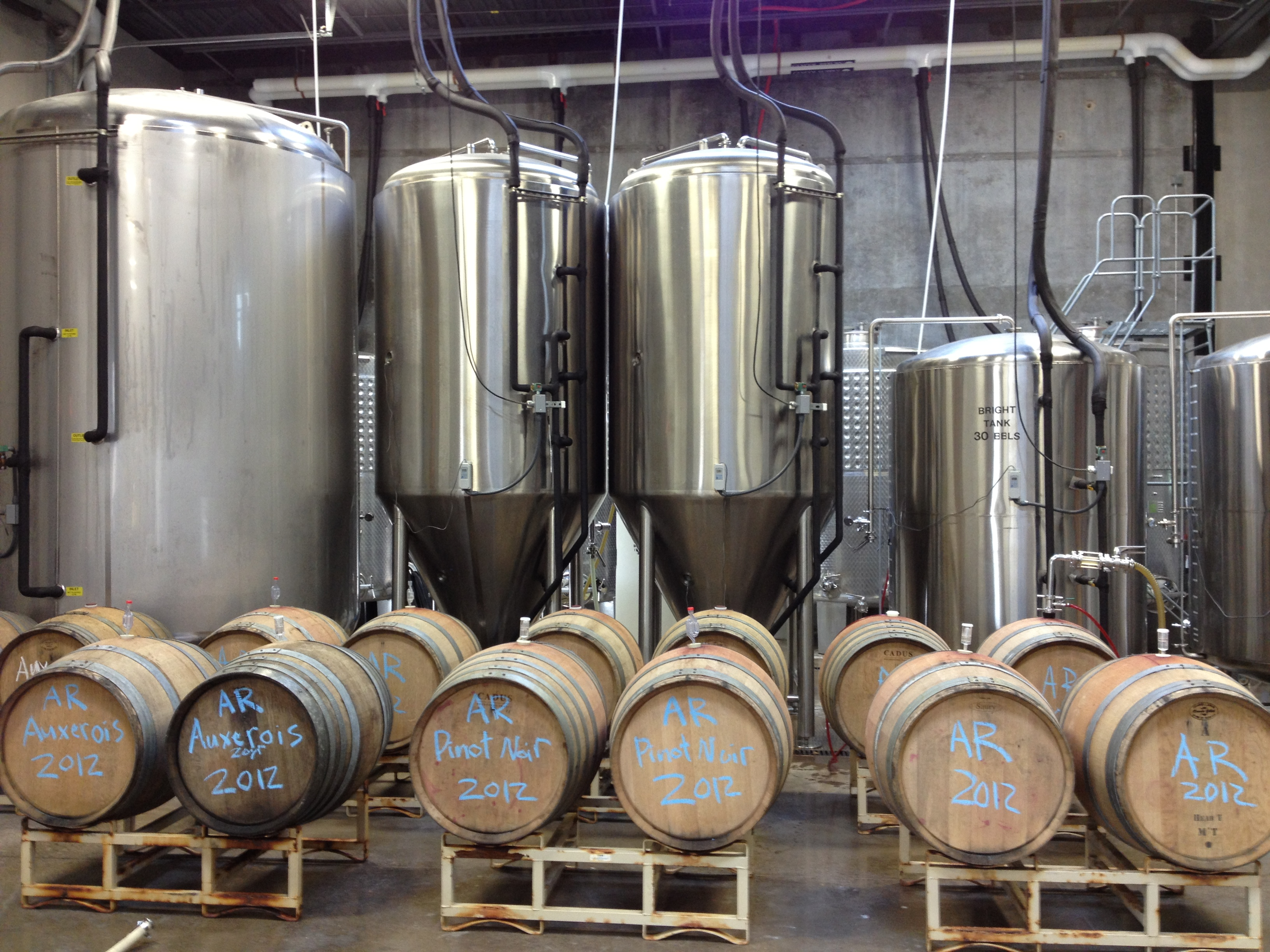
Fermentation tanks and aging barrels at the 2 Towns Ciderhouse brewing facility.

In 2012, the company moved to a 10,000-square-foot space in the same industrial park from which the company was launched. 2 Towns has production contracts with several orchards and launched its own orchard in 2012.

=== Product line ===
The first two varieties released commercially by 2 Towns Ciderhouse were "Incider", a semi-sweet beverage, and "Bad Apple".

Other specialty varieties are made, including a pear cider-based beverage and other creations using a range of additive flavoring ingredients, such as marionberry, blueberry, pineapple, cinnamon, and ginger.

In addition to its year-round product line, 2 Towns makes specialized seasonal varieties and sometimes makes use of barrel-aging techniques associated with the making of wine and liquor.

2 Towns products are distributed in 22-ounce bottles, 12-ounce cans, and kegs. The company's total production for 2013 was estimated at 4,500 barrels (140,000 gallons).

=== Marketing ===
In 2014, 2 Towns signed on as an official sponsor of the Portland Timbers of Major League Soccer. According to the terms of the deal, 2 Towns products would be available from multiple taps at all Timbers games and at other sporting events at Providence Park in Portland, including soccer games of the Portland Thorns FC.

=== Awards ===
- Gold medal, 2014 US Open Beer Championship

== See also ==
- Brewing in Oregon
- List of cider brands
