= Cascade Lakes Brewing Company =

Brewery based in Redmond, Oregon, U.S.

- Type: Brewing Company
- Location: Redmond, Oregon, United States
- Opened: 1994
- Owner: Rhine Family

Active beers
Rooster Tail Ale (golden ale), Monkey Face Porter (porter), Angus MacDougals (Scottish ale), I.P.A. (India pale ale), Pine Marten Pale Ale, 20" Brown (brown ale), Blonde Bombshell
Name	Type

Cascade Lakes Brewing Company is a brewery founded in 1994 in Redmond, Oregon, United States. The brewery operates two locations throughout Central Oregon, the newest in SE Bend in July 2023; the West side location was closed in January 2024. Their brews include:

- Rooster Tail Ale (golden ale)
- Monkey Face Porter (porter)
- Angus MacDougals (Scottish ale)
- I.P.A. (India pale ale)
- Pine Marten Pale Ale
- 20" Brown (brown ale)
- Blonde Bombshell

The brewery also produces several seasonal beers.

Cascades Lakes Brewing Company is Central Oregon's only not-for-profit brewery.

== See also ==
- Beer in the United States
- Brewing in Oregon
