= SheBrew =

Annual beer festival in Portland, Oregon, U.S.

- Logo
- Status: Active
- Frequency: Annually
- Location: Portland, Oregon
- Country: United States
- Inaugurated: 2013
- Website: shebrew.beer

SheBrew is an annual beer and cider festival in Portland, Oregon, United States. The family-friendly event showcases women and non-binary people in the brewing industry from the Pacific Northwest. Event profits benefit the Human Rights Campaign and the Oregon Brew Crew.

== History ==
Event attendance has grown steadily over time. The first event in 2013 was held at the Q Center and attended by approximately 50 people. For the 2018 event, Lee Hedgmon of McMenamins brewed a green beer called 'Welcome Back to Oz, Bitches!' Approximately 1,000 people were expected for the 2020 festival, which was held in March and among the city's last festivals before the arrival of the COVID-19 pandemic. The 2021 event was canceled because of the pandemic and the 2022 was held at Castaway Portland; among COVID-19 precautions were proof of vaccination and enforcement of face masks.

The 2023 and 2024 events were held at Redd on Salmon Street. Jenn McPoland was among organizers of the event in 2025, which was held on International Women's Day at The Leftbank Annex and had an expected turnout of approximately 1,500 people. The 2026 event was held at the Portland Art Museum. It featured a photo booth, women-owned food carts, and Girl Scout Cookies for sale. The festival also expanded into spirits in 2026.

== Reception ==
In 2023, Jeff Alworth of Portland Monthly wrote, "Now women are a common sight in the brewhouse, thanks in part to SheBrew, a festival featuring female brewers that launched in 2013. Not only did it showcase the excellence of women brewers, but it attracted a different kind of audience." SheBrew ranked first in the Best Craft Beer Festival category of Willamette Week's annual 'Best of Portland' readers' poll in 2026.

== See also ==
- Brewing in Oregon
- Culture of Portland, Oregon
- International Women's Collaboration Brew Day
- Oregon Brewers Festival
- Portland International Beerfest
- Women in brewing
