= PDX Sliders =

Restaurant in Portland, Oregon, U.S.

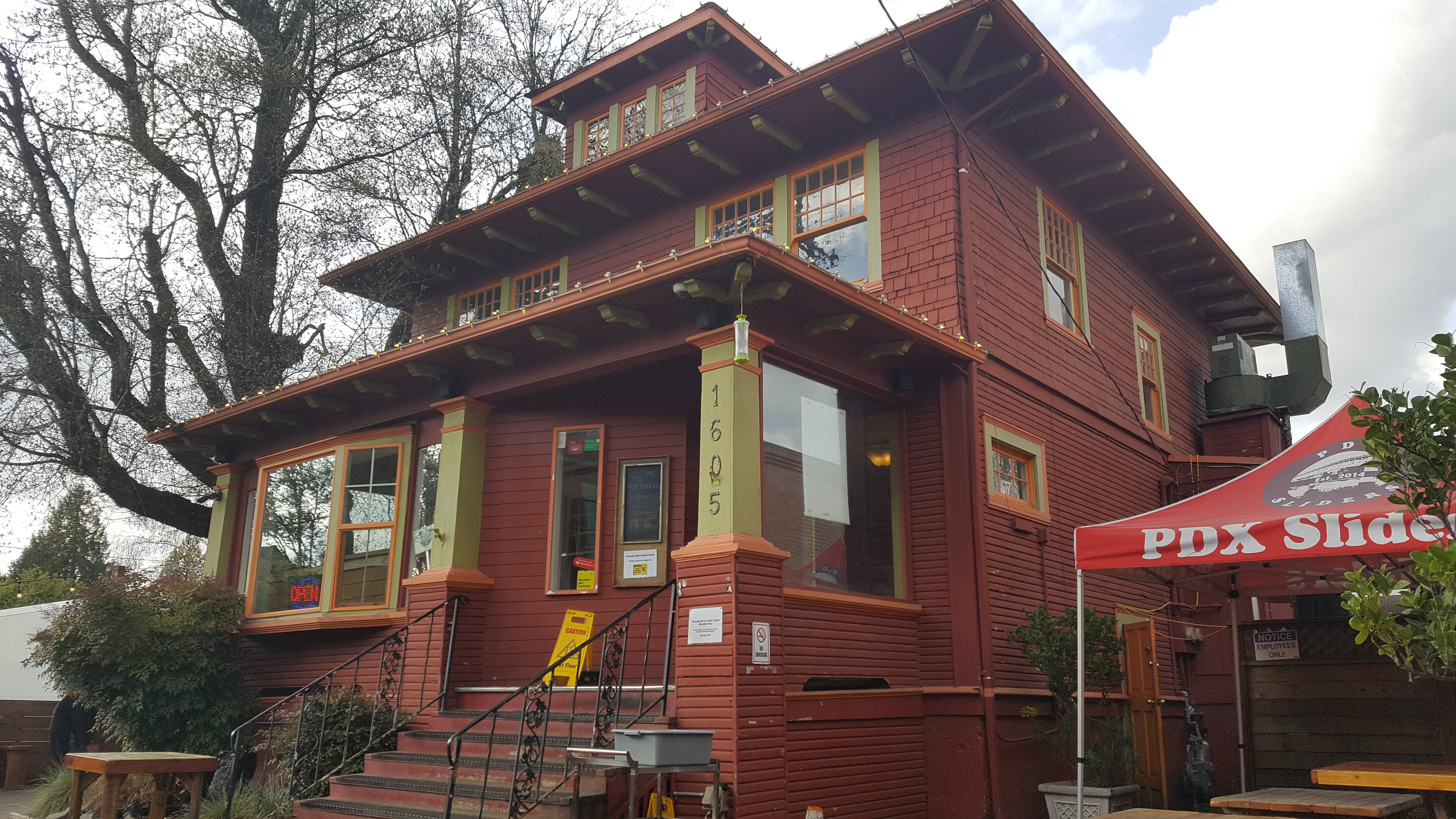
- The Sellwood-Moreland restaurant in 2022
- Interactive map of PDX Sliders

Restaurant information
- Established: 2014
- Owner: Ryan Rollins
- Location: 1605 Southeast Bybee Boulevard; 3101 Southeast Division Street, Portland, Multnomah, Oregon, 97202, United States
- Coordinates: 45.4739°N 122.6498°W
- Website: pdxsliders.com

PDX Sliders is a restaurant with three locations in Portland, Oregon, United States.

== Description ==
PDX Sliders is a restaurant with three locations in Portland. The menu includes sliders and full-size burgers (with chicken, pork, or vegetables), salads, loaded fries, and cocktails. The sandwiches are named after Portland bridges and streets. The Hawthorne has bacon, goat cheese, and strawberry preserves on brioche, and the Burlington has pecan-smoked pork. The Sellwood has a beef patty, cheddar cheese by Beecher's Handmade Cheese, bacon, caramelized onions, butter lettuce, and aioli, on brioche.

== History ==
PDX Sliders was owned by Ryan Rollins, who opened the business as a food cart in 2014. PDX Sliders began operating as a brick and mortar restaurant on Bybee Boulevard in southeast Portland's Sellwood-Moreland neighborhood on January 21, 2017. In October, Rollins announced plans to expand to the former Sunshine Tavern space on Division Street in the Richmond neighborhood. He hoped to open by December 1. The restaurant opened on December 8 with a seating capacity of approximately 45. In September 2019, Drew Carney of KGW said PDX Sliders had "plans to unveil a third [location] by the end of the year". Rollins died in 2023.

== Reception ==
In 2016, PDX Sliders ranked number four in National Geographic's "The Best Burgers in America: A Definitive Guide", based on Yelp data. Alex Frane included PDX Sliders in Thrillist's 2019 list of "The 11 Best Spots to Smash a Burger in Portland". He also included the restaurant in Eater Portland's 2019 overview of "where to imbibe and dine" in Sellwood and Westmoreland. Katrina Yentch and staff included PDX Sliders in the website's 2022 list of "22 Go-to Spots for Affordable Dining in Portland".

In 2021, Zuri Anderson included PDX Sliders in iHeart's overview of "Where You Can Find the Best Loaded Fries in Portland", and said the restaurant was the second highest-rated in Portland for burgers based on Yelp data. Writers ranked the restaurant number 10 in Portland Monthly's 2021 list of "Portland's 20 Best Cheeseburgers, Exhaustively Argued and Ranked".

PDX Sliders was a runner-up in the Best Burger category of Willamette Week's annual 'Best of Portland' readers' poll in 2022. The business placed second in the same category in 2024 and 2025, and was a finalist in the same category in 2026.

== See also ==
- List of restaurant chains in the United States
