= Old Milwaukie City Hall =

Historic municipal building in Milwaukie, Oregon

Milwaukie City Hall
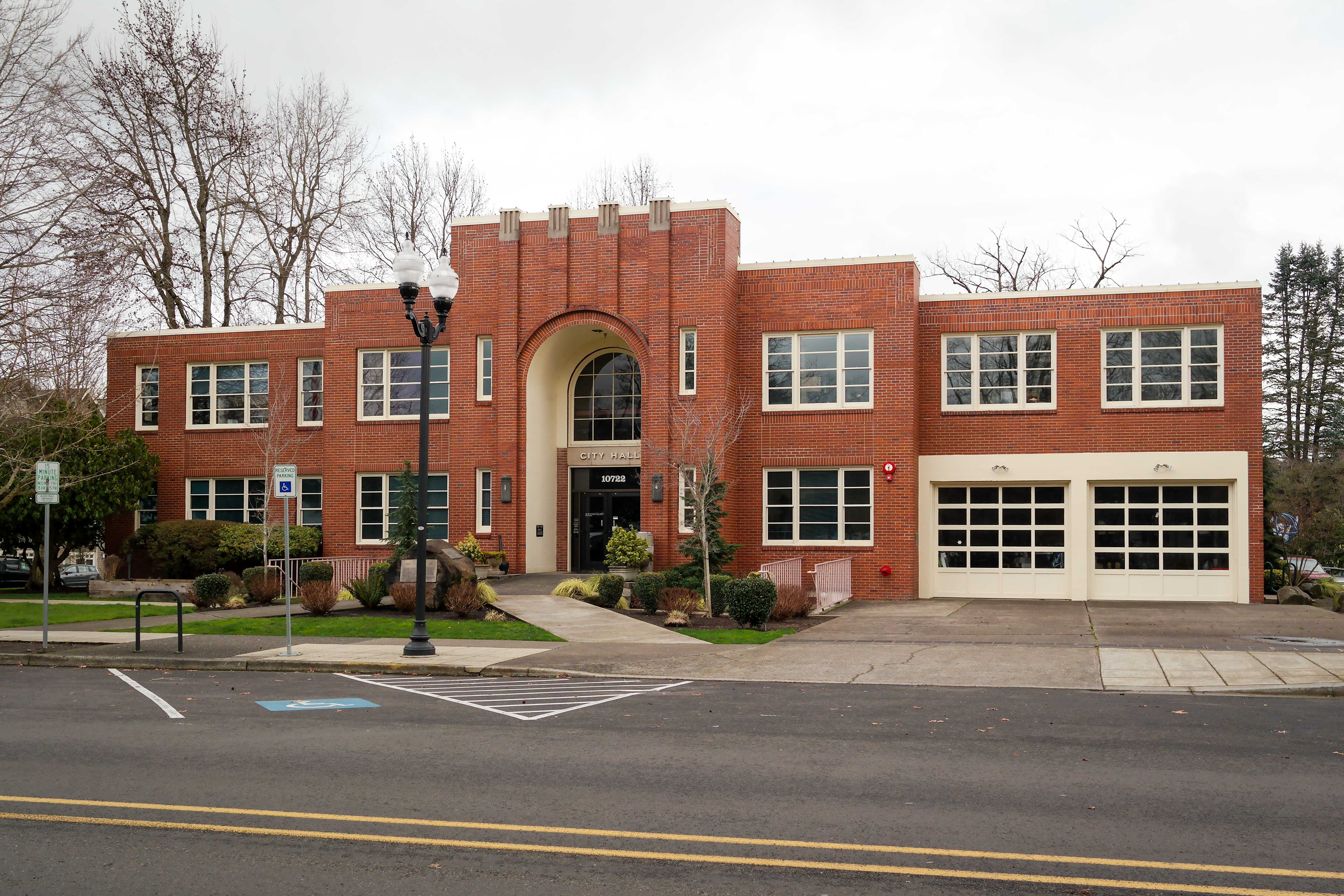
- The building's exterior, 2015

- Location within Oregon

General information
- Location: Milwaukie, Oregon, United States
- Coordinates: 45.44520°N 122.64117°W
- Opened: 1938
- Closed: 2023 (as city hall)

Milwaukie City Hall is a historic building and the former city hall of Milwaukie, Oregon, United States. The building was built during 1937–1938 as a Public Works Administration project. It was the third building to serve as Milwaukie's city hall. It ceased to be used as the city hall in August 2023, replaced by a new, larger building. The building was listed on the National Register of Historic Places in 2026.

In 2024, the building began to be remodeled into a commercial building featuring a brewery, restaurant, bakery, and community art and gathering spaces.

The redeveloped space opened in April 2025, feature a pFriem Family Brewers tasting room and a Keeper Coffee location.
