= Portland International Beerfest =

Annual event held in Portland, OR

- Status: Inactive
- Genre: Festival
- Frequency: Annually
- Country: United States

Portland International Beerfest is an annual three-day beer festival in Portland, Oregon.

== See also ==
- Brewing in Oregon
- Culture of Portland, Oregon
- Oregon Brewers Festival
- SheBrew
