= Occidental Brewing Company =

Brewery based in Portland, Oregon, U.S.

- Website: occidentalbeers.com

Occidental Brewing Company is a brewery based in Portland, Oregon, United States.

The business launched in north Portland in 2011. Ben and Dan Engler are the owners.

Occidental has German-style beers and lagers such as hefeweizen and kölsch.

== See also ==
- Brewing in Oregon
