= Gilgamesh Brewing =

Brewery in Salem, Oregon

Gilgamesh Brewing is a brewery in Salem, Oregon. It was established in 2009 and is family owned. Gilgamesh beers are distributed primarily in and around Salem.

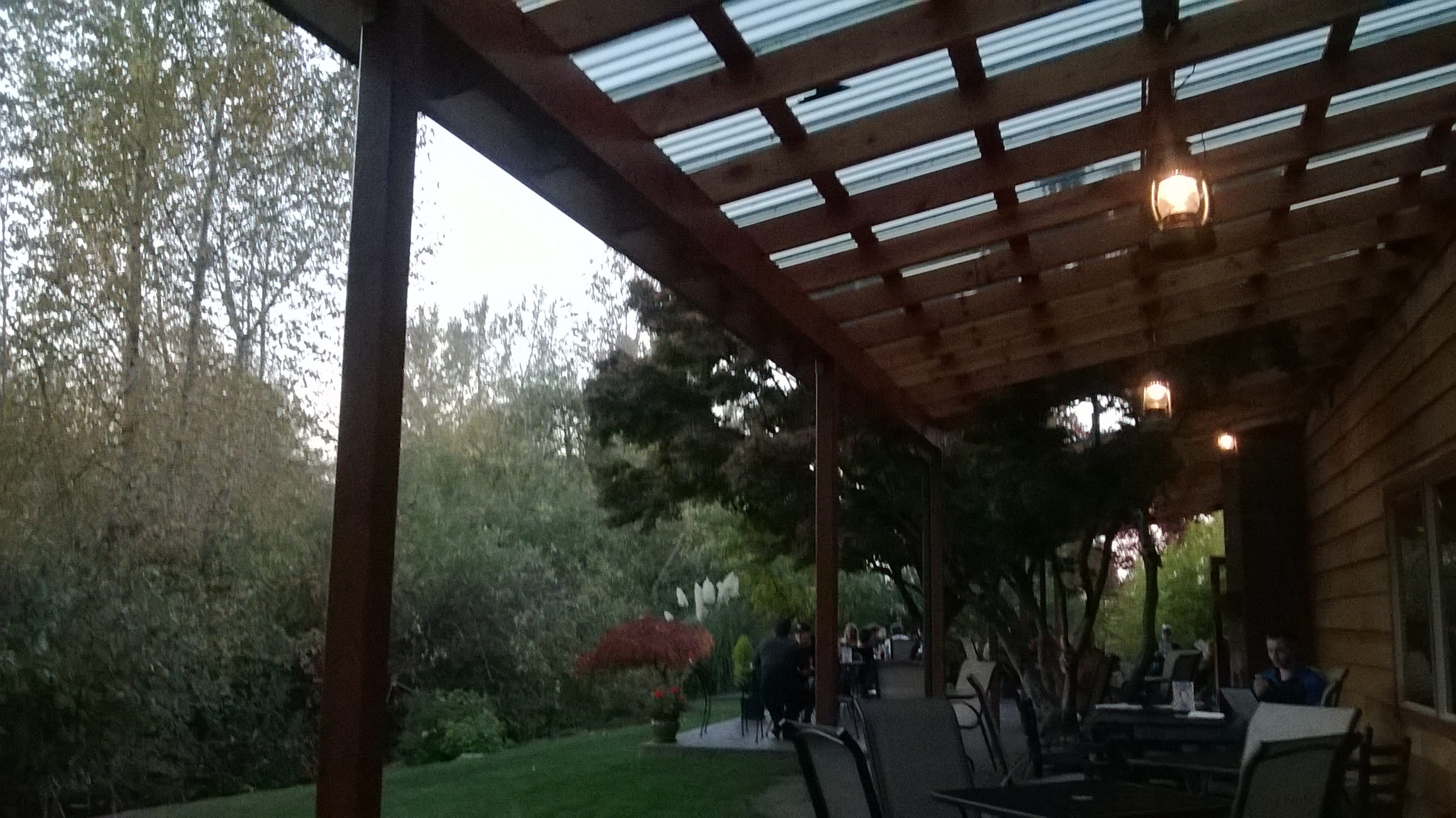
Gilgamesh Brewing Outdoor Lounge

== History ==
Gilgamesh Brewing was founded by Lee Radtke and his three sons Mike, Nick, and Matt. The family has lived in the area since the 1970s and were home brewing enthusiasts before establishing Gilgamesh Brewing. The business started in Turner, Oregon before expanding into downtown Salem.

Gilgamesh beers were available at the Winter Ale House at the Reed Opera House and the initial brewery location was at 210 Liberty Street SE, Suite 150, Salem, Oregon. In late 2012 the brewery relocated to a new 18,000 sq. ft. location on Madrona Avenue with a restaurant and pub.

The name of the company comes from the Epic of Gilgamesh, often cited as an early source for beer brewing and use.

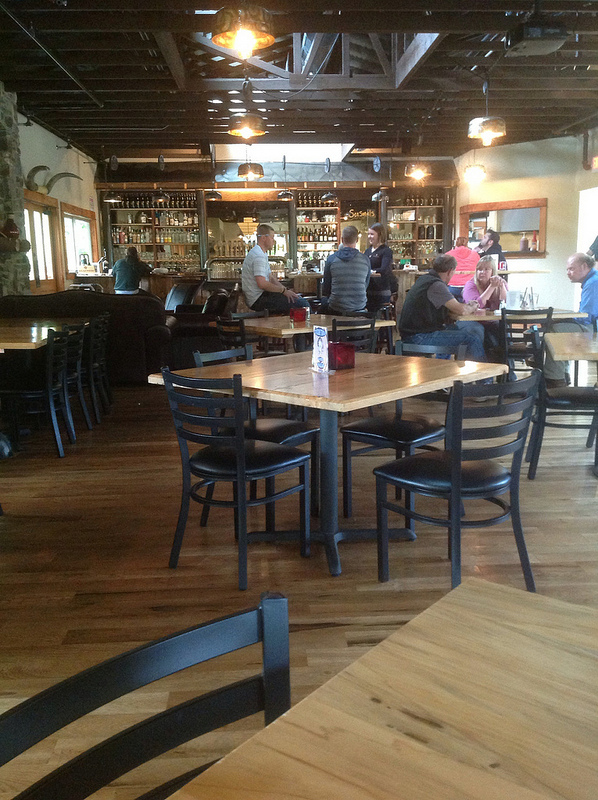
The interior of the Gilgamesh Brewing Lounge

== List beers/styles ==
Standard offerings include:

Beer Name	ABV	IBU	Description
Mamba	6.7%	0	A malt beverage defined by a black tea, bergamot, tangerine peel, and rye.
Filbert Lager	5.5%	17	A pilsner-style larger brewed with a light hop profile and Oregon hazelnuts mashed in with the grain.
DJ Jazzy Hef	5.4%	9	A light-bodied, American-style hefeweizen with a late jasmine addition. This beer has a notable floral aroma.
Pumphouse Copper	4.5%	43	A light ale crafted between an amber ale and a pale ale. This hybrid beer has a light body with a hoppy flavor.
Hopscotch Ale	8.0%	16	A hop-backed Strong (Scotch) Ale. This Scottish-influenced, malt beer has caramel notes and a mild, citrus finish.
Vader Coffee CDA	7.5%	75	A black IPA aged with lightly roasted coffee beans from local roasters, The Governor's Cup. Dark, tawny malts and gradient hop flavors.
