= Sunshine Tavern =

Defunct restaurant in Portland, Oregon, U.S.

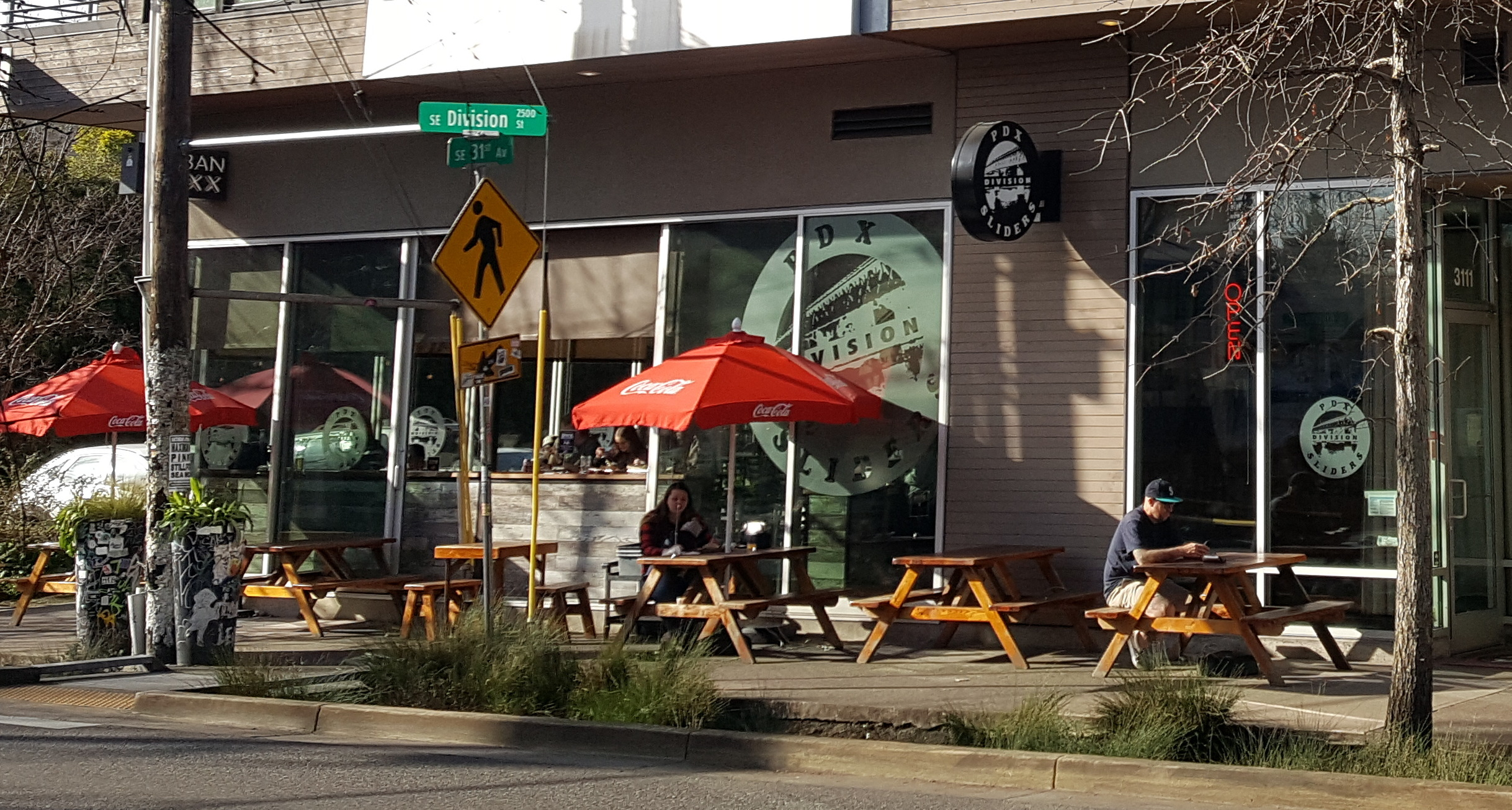
- 2022 photograph of the exterior of a PDX Sliders restaurant operating in the space previously occupied by Sunshine Tavern from 2011 to 2017
- Interactive map of Sunshine Tavern

Restaurant information
- Established: April 2011
- Closed: April 2017
- Food type: American
- Location: 3111 Southeast Division Street, Portland, Multnomah County, Oregon, United States
- Coordinates: 45.5049°N 122.6334°W

Sunshine Tavern was a restaurant in Portland, Oregon, United States. It operated from 2011 to 2017.

== Description ==
Sunshine Tavern was located on Division Street in southeast Portland's Richmond neighborhood. The menu included burgers, fried chicken, pizzas, and ice cream. The egg-dominant brunch menu included pizza with eggs and tesa; a version of Eggs Benedict featuring biscuits with ham, fried eggs, oysters, and hollandaise, and a pasta frittata with marinara and arugula. In 2018, Michael Russell of The Oregonian described Sunshine Tavern as "a lively bar with upscale pub grub".

== History ==
Jenn Louis and David Welch had secured the space which would house Sunshine Tavern by August 2010. The restaurant opened in April 2011, slightly later than previously reported opening dates of January and March. Sunshine Tavern began serving weekend brunch on September 2, 2011. Neva Knott became the owner in November 2016. The new owners closed Sunshine Tavern in April 2017, intending to reopen as Black Dog Lounge.

== Reception ==
In 2011, David Sarasohn of The Oregonian gave the restaurant a 'B' rating. In 2012, Jennifer M. Wood included Sunshine Tavern in Relish.com's list of "America's 10 Best Pizza Restaurants". Chad Walsh of Eater Portland included the restaurant in his 2016 list of "Where to Take Your Parents Out to Eat". Travel + Leisure said, "Best described as elevated pub food, standouts here are definitely the burgers—brioche bun, house-made pancetta—and spicy fried chicken and Belgian-style waffles."
