= Hood River Waterfront Park =

Park in Hood River, Oregon, U.S.

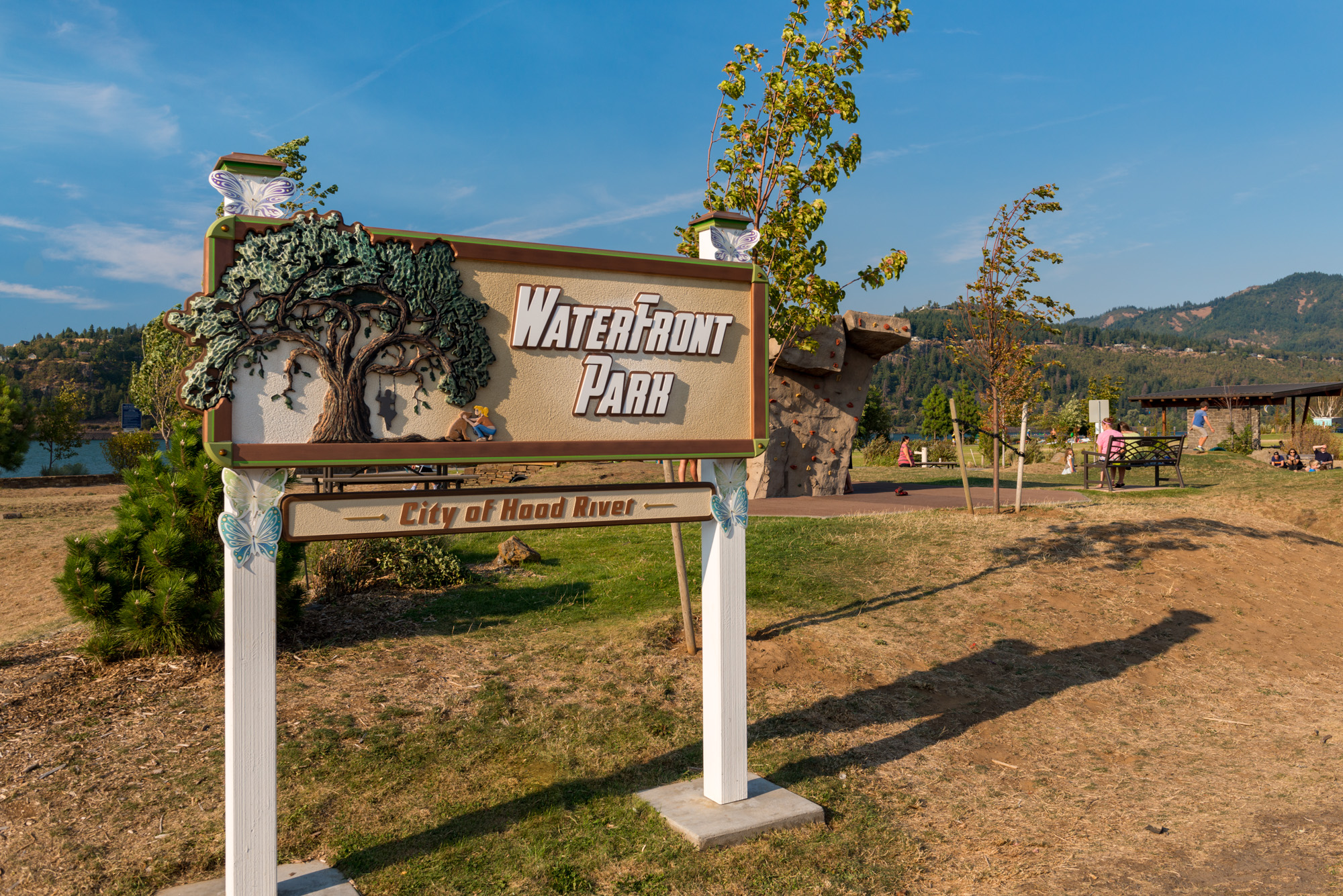
- Park sign
- Interactive map of Hood River Waterfront Park
- Location: Hood River, Oregon, U.S.
- Coordinates: 45.7153°N 121.5178°W

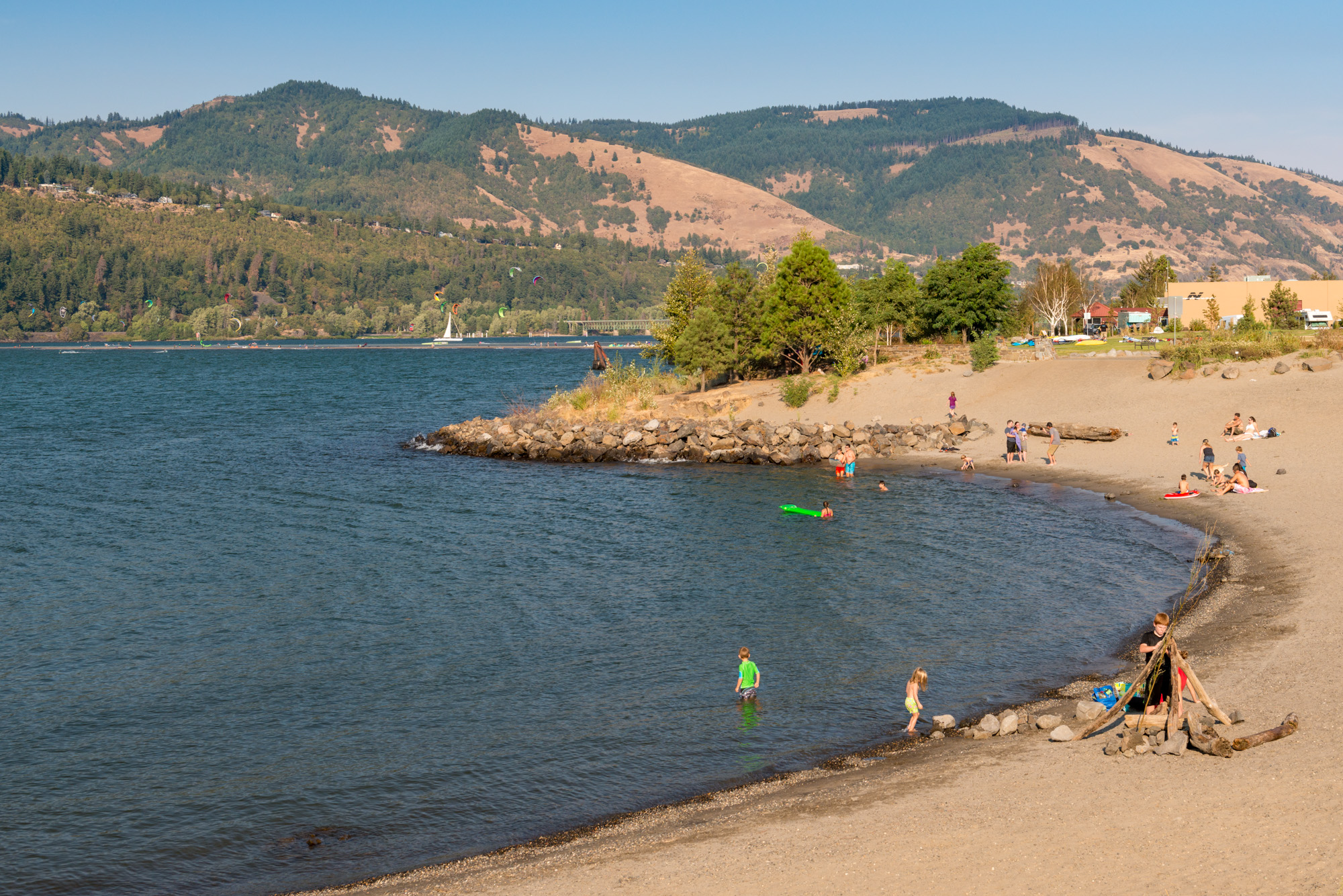
View of part of the park

Hood River Waterfront Park is a park in Hood River, Oregon, United States.

== Description ==
Hood River Waterfront Park is along the Columbia River in Hood River, Oregon. It has a playground, public art, a climbing wall, and designated sandy and swimming areas. The park serves as a launch site for kiteboarding and windsurfing. It has also been a viewing site for the city's Independence Day fireworks show.

== Reception ==
In 2023, Katrina Yentch of Eater Portland called the park one of the country's top destinations for these two activities. Outside magazine has called Waterfront Park a "summertime hangout". Portland Monthly has called the park "beautiful".
