= De Garde Brewing =

Brewery based in Tillamook, Oregon, U.S.

Coordinates: 45.4572866°N 123.8453827°W

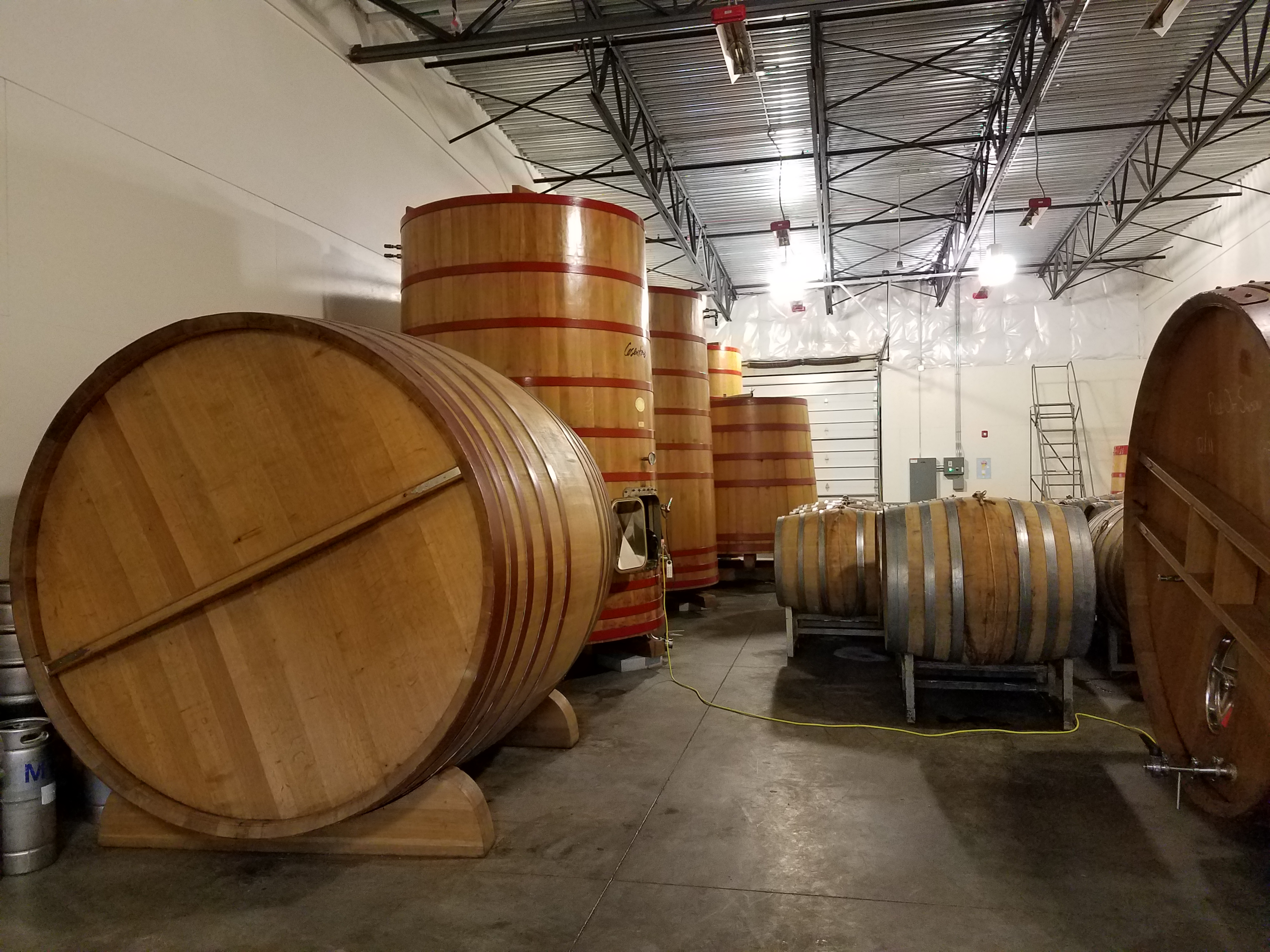
- Location: Tillamook, Oregon, U.S.

de Garde Brewing is a brewery based in Tillamook, Oregon. de Garde is one of very few breweries in the United States to use all spontaneous fermentation, in which beer in a coolship takes in wild yeasts from the air; the beer is then aged, sometimes with fruit added, in foeders. In 2016, they won the fifth best brewery in the world award from RateBeer, and were named the best brewer in Oregon.

== History ==
The brewery was started by a husband and wife, Trevor Rogers and Linsey (Hamacher) Rogers. Trevor had been working as an Assistant Manager at Pacific City's Pelican Brewing, and Linsey worked for the Tilllamook Cheese Factory. They started the brewery out of their garage in Tillamook, and sought to brew using wild yeasts from the coastal air. Trevor tried placing wort samples along the Oregon Coast to determine the best location for spontaneous fermentation; Tillamook won out.

As demand grew, they moved production facilities to several different places within Tillamook. Their production facility is currently located at 114 Ivy Ave in Tillamook.

== Beers ==
They offer a rotating list of wild ales — lambics, gueuzes, and krieks similar to those you would find in Belgium. On-premises sales account for 95% of their bottle sales, and they rarely sell kegs outside the tasting room. Most of their beers are produced in quantities of fewer than 1,000 bottles.
