= Hair of the Dog Brewing Company =

Brewery in Portland, Oregon, U.S.

Coordinates: 45.5160°N 122.6655°W

Hair of the Dog

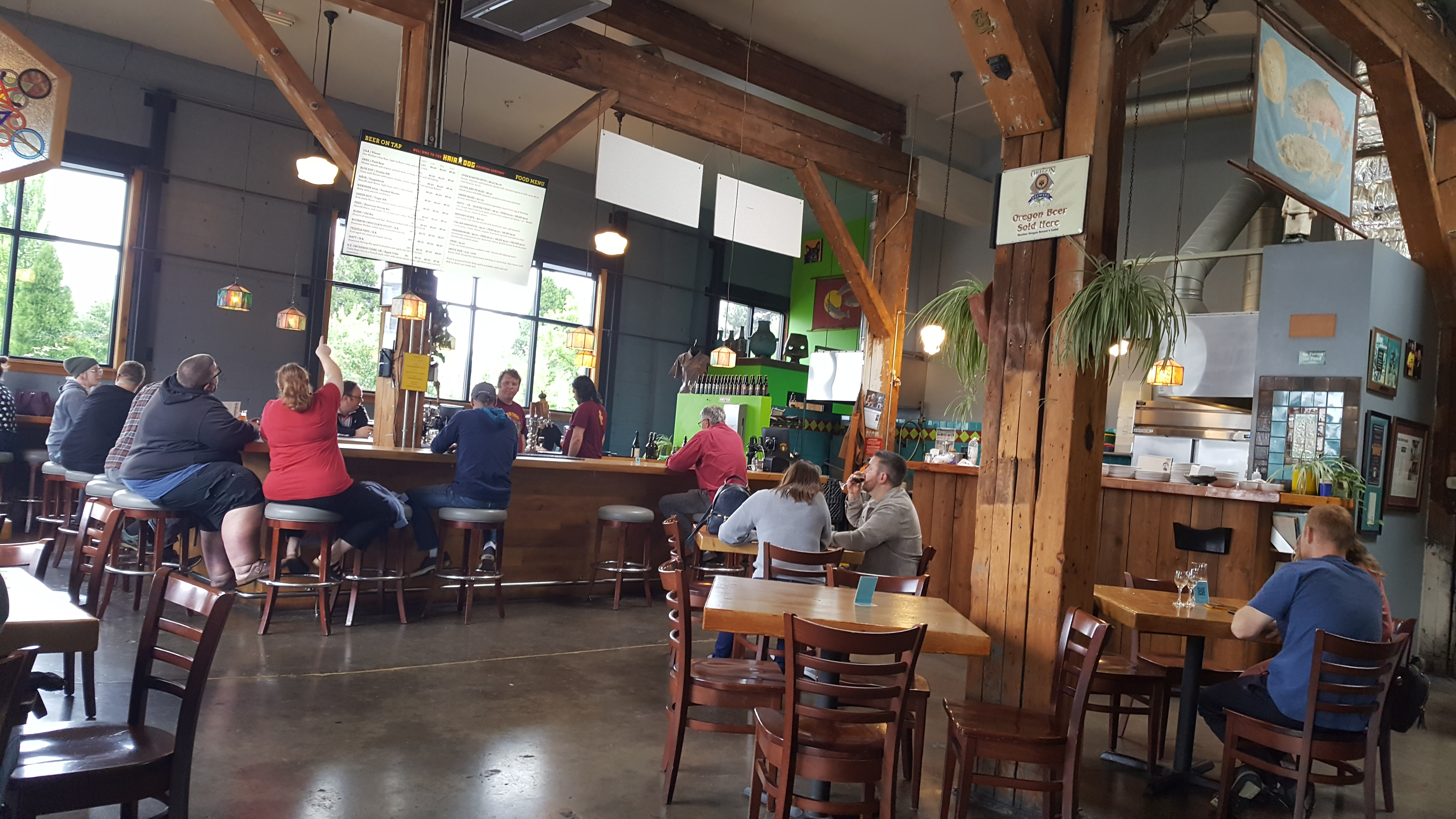
- Interior of the tasting room in 2022
- Industry: Alcoholic beverage
- Founded: 1993
- Defunct: 2022
- Headquarters: Portland, Oregon, U.S.
- Products: Beer
- Website: www.hairofthedog.com

Hair of the Dog Brewing Company was a brewery in Portland, Oregon, United States. Several of its beers were bottle conditioned. The brewery closed its doors on June 26, 2022.

The brewery was known for its uncommon beer styles at the time, such as Adambier and very strong barley wines.

== See also ==
- Brewing in Oregon
