= PFriem Family Brewers =

Craft brewery in Hood River, Oregon

pFriem Family Brewers
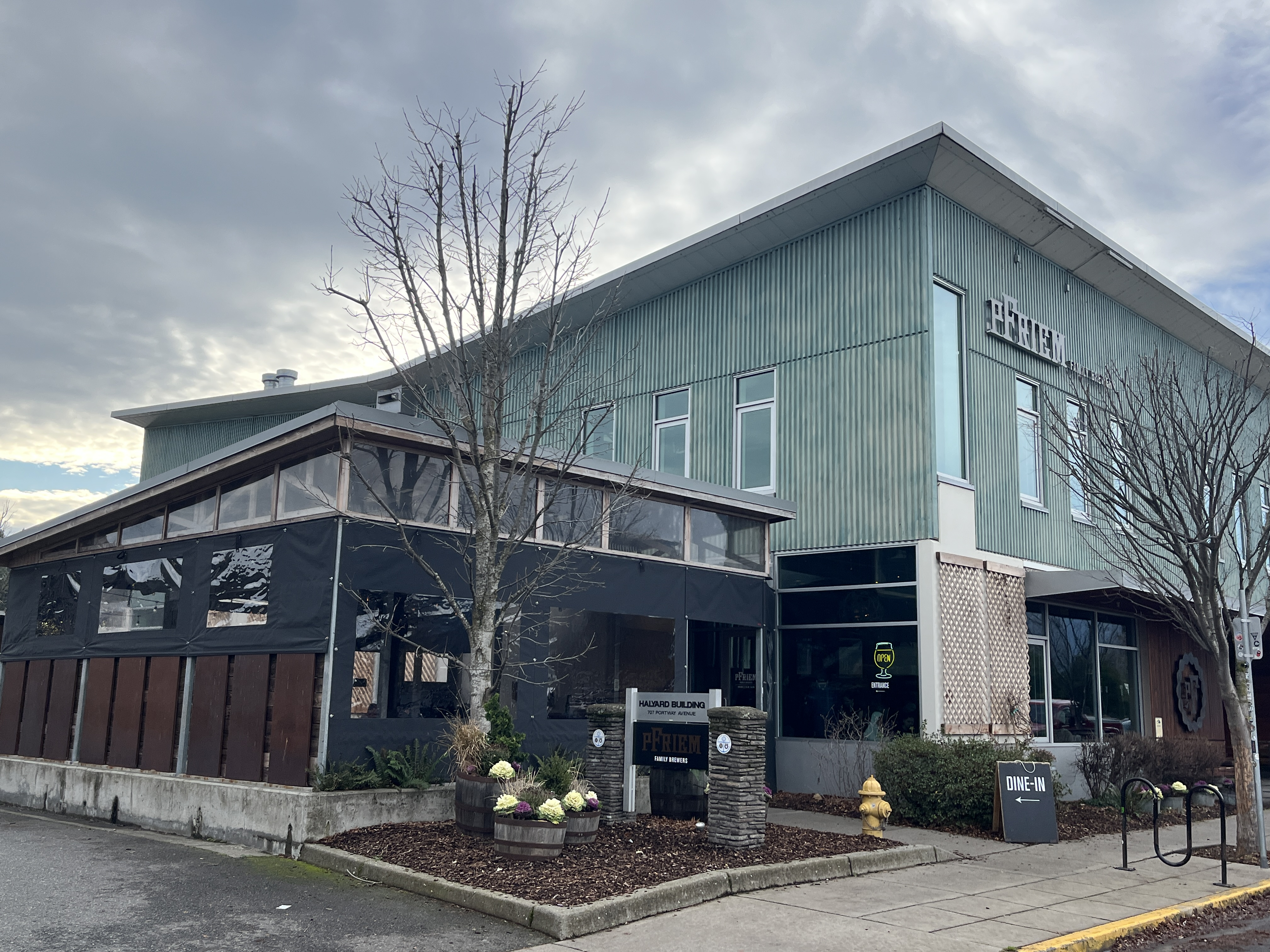
- Location: Hood River, Oregon, United States
- Opened: 2012
- Annual production volume: 15,305 US beer barrels (17,960 hl) (2017)
- Website: pfriembeer.com

pFriem Family Brewers (/ˈfriːm/) is a craft brewery in Hood River, Oregon, known for its Belgian and Northwest-style ales.

== History ==
The company was founded in 2012 by three former employees of Hood River-based Full Sail Brewing Company, including brand namesake and brewmaster Josh Pfriem. pFriem beers include an India pale ale (IPA), pilsner, Belgian, Belgian Strong Dark and a Flanders red ale, as well as seasonal brews. As of 2018, pFriem operates a tasting room in Hood River and is distributed in Oregon, Washington, and British Columbia.

== Recognition ==
In September 2018, pFriem was named the best midsize brewery in the U.S. at the Great American Beer Festival. pFriem produced 15,305 barrels in 2017, just barely qualifying for the category, which recognizes companies producing between 15,000 and 6 million barrels annually. It was the second time an Oregon brewery had been so awarded, following Widmer Brothers in 2004. pFriem also won second place in the German-Style Pilsner category. pFriem's pilsner has been described as influential among other brewers and in 2017, Willamette Week called it "arguably the best all-around" brewery in the state of Oregon.
