= Laurelwood Pub and Brewery =

Restaurant and brewery chain in Oregon, U.S.

Coordinates: 45.54011°N 122.61066°W

Restaurant information
- Dress code: Casual
- Location: Portland, Oregon, Oregon, United States
- Website: www.laurelwoodbrewpub.com

Laurelwood Brewing Co is a brewery located in the state of Oregon. They previously operated five brew pub locations around the Portland metropolitan area. As of 2023 all locations have closed. It was founded by Mike De Kalb and his wife Cathy Woo-De Kalb. The brewery has run pubs in Portland International Airport.

== See also ==
- List of restaurant chains in the United States
