= Full Sail Brewing Company =

Craft brewery in Oregon, US

- Interactive map of Full Sail Brewing Company
- Location: Hood River, Oregon, United States
- Coordinates: 45.710°N 121.516°W
- Opened: 1987
- Key people: Andrew Lamont Jamie Emmerson Irene Firmat
- Annual production volume: 130,000 US beer barrels (150,000 hl) (2007)
- Owner: Encore Consumer Capital
- Website: fullsailbrewing.com

Active beers
- Tropic Supreme
- Cosmic Gorge Hazy Pale Ale
- Amber Ale
- Session Premium Lager
- Blood Orange Wheat Ale
- Hood River Hazy IPA
- Shortest Day
- Haze of the Gods
- West Coast Style IPA
- Lazy Summer Haze
- Imperial Stout
Name	Type

Seasonal beers
- Wreck the Halls
- Cool like the cold IPA
- Believing is Seeing Double IPA
- Wassail
- Session Cerveza
- Session Hefeweizen Wheat
- Bad Daddy's Amber Ale
- Blood Orange Hefeweizen
Name	Type

Other beers
- Harrington Barrel Aged Series
- Kentucky Cream Barrel Aged Pale Ale
- Top Sail Bourbon Barrel Aged Imperial Porter 2017
- Bourbon Barrel Aged Imperial Stout 2016
- Bourbon Barrel Wheatwine Ale 2016
- Slipknot IPA (Brewmasters Reserve)
Name	Type

Full Sail Brewing Company was a craft brewery in Hood River, Oregon, United States. Founded in 1987, Full Sail was the first commercially successful craft brewery to bottle beer in the Pacific Northwest for retail sale, and one of Oregon's early microbreweries. The first beer packaged was Full Sail Golden Ale, followed in 1988 by Full Sail Imperial Porter, Full Sail Amber Ale, and Wassail Winter Ale.

Full Sail was acquired by Sazerac, the parent company of big brands such as Buzzballz and Svedka Vodka, in 2026. Monday November 2, 2026, Full Sail announced their day-of closure.

== History ==
Oregon ranks second nationally in craft breweries per capita.

The first year's total production of 287 barrels was brewed by four employees, followed by 2,200 barrels the next year. In 2007, Full Sail brewed more than 120,000 barrels.

Based upon beer sales volume, Full Sail is the ninth largest craft brewery in the United States, the second largest craft brewer in Oregon, and the seventeenth largest brewery in the United States.

Full Sail became employee-owned in July 1999 through an employee stock ownership plan with the 47 employees. In March 2015, the employees voted to sell to Oregon Craft Brewers Co., an investment group formed by San Francisco-based private equity firm Encore Consumer Capital. Their rebranding was led by a Portland-based design and strategy firm called Sandstrom.

In 2022, Full Sail brought on head brewmaster Andrew Lamont, formally the brewmaster at Old Town Brewing in Portland.

== Products and locations ==
In May 2005, Full Sail introduced Session Premium Lager, a tribute to pre-Prohibition beers and bottled in a stubby bottle. In 2007, Full Sail introduced a line of limited edition lager beers, called LTD#1 and LTD#2. LTD#3, a pilsner, debuted in May 2009. In July 2009 Full Sail added a new beer to their session line releasing Session Black Lager, also in the stubby 11 oz bottle.

The brewery is known for its quality microbrewed beers, most notably its trademark Amber Ale. Full Sail is located in the Columbia River Gorge in the city of Hood River, Oregon. The Full Sail brewery, pub, and tasting room are all located at the same site in downtown Hood River. Brewery tours are available daily, free of charge.

In July 2003, Full Sail began contract brewing three beers for SABMiller under the almost 150-year-old Henry Weinhard's brand: Henry Weinhard's Hefeweizen, Northwest Trail Blonde Lager, and Amber Light. SABMiller had purchased the brands from Stroh's in 1999, and for a few years had moved their production to its Tumwater, Washington brewery until it closed in 2003.

There is also a smaller Full Sail brewhouse in Portland, Oregon which serves as their research and development center and is where the small batch Brewmaster Reserve and Brewer's Share beers are concocted.

An arrival route into Portland International Airport, the TMBRS (Timbers) has successive waypoints named FFULL, SSAIL, MYCRO, BBREW, and PUBBB (Full Sail microbrew pub).

Full Sail was purchased by Sazerac and closed its Taproom on November 2, 2026.

== Awards ==
The Full Sail brewery has earned many honors for its beers, some of which include:

- Twelve gold medals for Amber Ale at the World Beer Championships
- Four gold medals and six silver medals for Pale Ale at the World Beer Championships
- Five gold medals for India Pale Ale at the World Beer Championships
- Three gold medals for LTD 01 at the World Beer Championships
- Session Premier Lager named World's Best Premium Lager at the World Beer Awards
- Session Black Lager was awarded a gold medal at the 2009 Great American Beer Festival
- Session Black Lager was awarded a gold medal at the 2010 World Beer Cup
