= Mount Pisgah, Polk County, Oregon AVA =

American Viticultural Area in Oregon

Coordinates: 44°52′29″N 123°17′33″W

Mount Pisgah, Polk County, Oregon
- Wine region
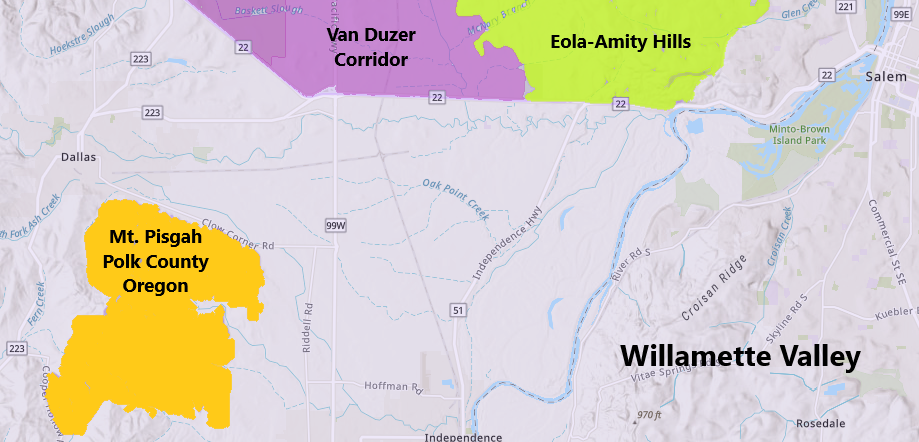
- Other names: Mt. Pisgah, Polk County, Oregon
- Type: American Viticultural Area
- Year established: 2022
- Years of wine industry: 45
- Country: United States
- Part of: Oregon, Willamette Valley AVA
- Other regions in Oregon, Willamette Valley AVA: Chehalem Mountains AVA, Dundee Hills AVA, Eola-Amity Hills AVA, Laurelwood District AVA, Lower Long Tom AVA, McMinnville AVA, Ribbon Ridge AVA, Tualatin Hills AVA, Van Duzer Corridor AVA, Yamhill-Carlton District AVA
- Growing season: 182 days
- Climate region: Region II
- Heat units: 2,543 GDDs units
- Precipitation (annual average): 40 inches (1,000 mm)
- Soil conditions: Marine silty clay loams, including Bellpine, Jory, Nekia, Rickreall, Willakenzie soil series
- Total area: 5,850 acres (9 sq mi)
- Size of planted vineyards: 695 acres (281 ha)
- No. of vineyards: 10
- Grapes produced: Chardonnay, Pinot blanc, Pinot gris, Pinot noir, Tempranillo
- No. of wineries: 2

Mount (or Mt.) Pisgah, Polk County, Oregon is an American Viticultural Area (AVA) located in the vast Willamette Valley landform within Polk County, Oregon. It surrounds the 835-foot (255 m) Mount Pisgah among the hills of the Willamette Valley located southwest of Eola Hills, Amity Hills and 15 miles (24 km) west from the state capital of Salem. It was established as the nation's 263^{rd}, the state's 23^{rd} and the valley's twelfth appellation on June 3, 2022 by the Alcohol and Tobacco Tax and Trade Bureau (TTB), Treasury after reviewing the petition submitted by representatives of local vineyards and wineries proposing a viticultural area in the Willamette Valley AVA named "Mount Pisgah, Polk County, Oregon."

The AVA encompasses approximately 5,850 acres (9 sq mi) and, at the outset, contained ten commercial vineyards cultivating about 648 acres (262 ha) sourcing two wineries. It is the southernmost sub-appellation within the Willamette Valley viticultural area. The petition notes that vineyard owners plan to expand four of the existing vineyards by 164 acres (66 ha).

== History and name ==
There are at least three geographic features in Oregon known as "Mount Pisgah." A local resident in an August 1927 compiler noted that Colonel Cornelius Gilliam, who crossed the Oregon Trail in 1844 and settled in Dallas, Oregon, the following year, named the little butte, covered with grass and trees, "Mt. Pisgah", for a butte so named near his old home in Missouri and his veneration for biblical names. Mount Pisgah (Hebrew: פִּסְגָּה, 'pɪz.ɡə PIZ-gah) is a mountain of Abarim, Moab, northeast of the Dead Sea, usually referring to Mount Nebo. The word פִּסְגָּה literally means "summit."

The TTB believes that it is important to clarify to which feature the wine label refers. Although the commenters stated that the proposed AVA is the only "Mount Pisgah" in Oregon where viticulture has been active since 1981, consumers might not be aware of this, and assume that the AVA name refers to one of the other regions. Therefore, the TTB believed that including the county in the proposed AVA name was necessary in order to reduce the chance of consumer confusion. Additionally, because "Polk County" is a common county name within the U.S., and multiple states have geographic features known as "Mount Pisgah," the TTB did not believe that shortening the proposed AVA name to "Mount Pisgah, Polk County" would sufficiently identify the proposed AVA's location. For these reasons, they did not consider establishing the AVA with an abbreviated shortened name. The long name is meant to avoid confusion with another "Mount Pisgah" in a different county or state; therefore, the viticultural area is described is "Mount Pisgah, Polk County, Oregon." The word "Mount" may be abbreviated as "Mt." in the AVA name. Consequently, wine bottlers using the name "Mount (or "Mt.) Pisgah, Polk County, Oregon" in a brand name, including a trademark, or in another label reference as to the origin of the wine, will have to ensure that the product is eligible to use the AVA name as an appellation of origin.

== Terroir ==
=== Topography ===
The distinguishing features of Mount Pisgah, Polk County, Oregon AVA are its topography, climate, geology, and soils. Its location, only six miles (9.7 km) from the Willamette River, takes advantage of the warmth near the Willamette Valley, the mild influence of the Van Duzer winds and the rain shadow of Laurel Mountain to the west. The AVA is located on a small mountain, Mount Pisgah, formed 65 million years ago as a sea floor volcano, covered by marine sediment and pushed up out of the ocean, among the hills of the Willamette Valley rising 260 to 835 feet (79–255 m) from the foothills to its peak. The foot of the mountain marks the boundary of the AVA and the peak is within the range of elevation for typical wine grape production in the region. All wine grape production in the AVA occurs between 260 and 750 ft (79–229 m) elevations, which allows for adequate heat accumulation and cold air drainage. The area also contains several creeks, including Fern Creek, Cooper Creek, and multiple forks of Ash Creek. The elevations and topography of the Mount Pisgah AVA help protect the vineyards from frost damage in the spring and fall, as cool air drains down the hillsides and creeks to the lower-elevation areas that occur in all directions outside of the AVA.

Mount Pisgah, Polk County, Oregon AVA has south-facing slopes. By contrast, the region to the south of the AVA, on the slopes of Fishback Hill, faces north. The difference in slope direction has an effect on viticulture. According to the petition, "On a south-facing slope and a north-facing, plants grow differently. Even if the soils are the same, there is different response to temperatures, different emergence times, and different development rates. The temperature variation across the field itself may be on the order of 5 °F (−15 °C). In growing degree days over a seven-month season, this could change the total by more than 500 GDDs at 5 °F (for only half the day) very significant considering the yearly totals mentioned earlier in this document." The petition states that grapes in Oregon are rarely planted on north-facing slopes for that reason.

=== Climate ===
According to the petition, temperatures within Mount Pisgah, Polk County, Oregon AVA are cooler than the regions to the east and north-northeast, with average annual growing degree day 1 (GDD) accumulation of 2,543 GDDs. The average annual GDD accumulations favor the production of grape varietals such as Pinot noir, Pinot gris, and Chardonnay, which are the most commonly grown grape varietals in the AVA. In comparison, GDD accumulations in the city of Salem, approximately 18 miles (29 km) east of the AVA, averaged 2,903 GDDs, and the town of McMinnville, 23 miles (37 km) to the north-northeast of the AVA, averaged 2661 GDDs. The AVA also has lower average wind speeds than the regions to the east and north-northeast. The average wind speed within Mount Pisgah, Polk County, Oregon AVA is 2.3 miles per hour (3.7 km/h), while winds in the city of Salem average 6.1 mph (9.8 km/h), and winds in the town of McMinnville average 5.2 mph (8.4 km/h). According to the petition, high winds can break new grapevine shoots and desiccate grapes. The USDA plant hardiness zone is 8b.

=== Soils ===
The geology of Mount Pisgah AVA affects the composition of the soils. The petition states that the weathered soils in the upper layers of the Mount Pisgah, Polk County, Oregon AVA contain fine to coarse grains with calcareous concretions, and are carbonaceous and micaceous. These soils are generally classified as marine sediments and have a combination of shallow topsoil and clayey and silty subsoils. The main soil series in the AVA are marine silty clay loams, including Bellpine, Jory, Nekia, Rickreall, Willakenzie, and others. Silty clay loams make up 92.1 percent of all soils within the AVA. In his Grape Grower's Handbook, Ted Goldammer writes, "The primary soil property in determining a suitable site is soil texture. Texture affects the water holding capacity of the soils and internal water drainage."

The petition states that soil drainage class is important to grape growth during the growing season. According to a USDA soil drainage classification map included in the petition, approximately 92 percent of the soils within the AVA are well drained or moderately well drained. The USDA defines well drained soils as soils in which water is removed readily, but not rapidly. Well drained soils are commonly medium textured. Water is available for plants throughout most of the growing season, and soil wetness does not inhibit the growth of roots for significant periods. The USDA defines moderately well drained soils as soils in which water is removed somewhat slowly during some periods. Grapes are particularly sensitive to high water levels. However, grapes do need some water in the summer months, and, according to the petition, available water capacity in the AVA is moderately high. A map of available water capacity of the soils of the AVA and the surrounding regions shows the values of the soils in the AVA range narrowly from 0.06 to 0.05 in (0.16–0.12 cm) of water to one centimetre (0.39 in) of soil, which enables dry farming. Hydraulic conductivity of soil is a linear measurement that describes the ease with which water moves through soil when it is saturated. It is measured in K_{sat}. According to the petition, a balanced K_{sat} value allows for root penetration at slow but acceptable rates. According to a map of K_{sat} values of the soils of the AVA and surrounding regions that was included in the petition, the AVA has K_{sat} ratings between 3.0 and 4.7, which constitutes a balanced distribution when it comes to hydraulic conductivity.

The areas surrounding the Mount Pisgah, Polk County, Oregon AVA have different soil characteristics, as they all contain alluvial deposits from the recent Quaternary period, instead of sedimentary deposits. To the north of the AVA, soils are clayey alluvium, have a lower K_{sat} rating, and are more poorly drained. To the west, the soils are alluvial loam, have a lower K_{sat} rating, and are more poorly drained. To the south of the AVA, soils are silty alluvial and have a lower K_{sat} rating. Soils to the south of the AVA are also not as well drained as the soils within the AVA, even though the differences in soil drainage are not as easily visible on the soil drainage map as they are in other surrounding regions. And to the east of the AVA, soils are silty alluvium and alluvial loam, have a higher K_{sat} rating and also more poorly drained.

== Viticulture ==
The pioneering work of the Freedom Hill Vineyard on the Mount Pisgah slopes began in 1981. As the Valley's second smallest AVA, Mount Pisgah is also its most densely planted, as up to 10 vineyards have since emerged, taking advantage of the warmth near the Willamette, the mild influence of the Van Duzer winds, and the rain shadow of Laurel Mountain to the west. The area has become an idyllic alternative to the established paths of Oregon's wine country. The elevated vineyards at 350 to 600 ft (110–180 m) allow cold air to drain to the valley, and benefit from heat rising from the valley floor. The soils are from 97% colluvial and residual geological parent material over a paleocene rock formation, leaving 92% marine silty clay loams which drain well and retain water in the summer. Nowhere else within the Williamette Valley AVA does this specific combination of geology and soils exist. Its topography, including creek beds and hill formations, distinguishes it from surrounding lower areas and the hills to the south.

Chardonnay, Pinot blanc, Pinot gris, Pinot noir, and Tempranillo are the most common grape varieties cultivated here.
