= Dundee Hills AVA =

American Viticultural Area in Oregon

Coordinates: 45°16′49″N 123°03′48″W

Dundee Hills
- Wine region
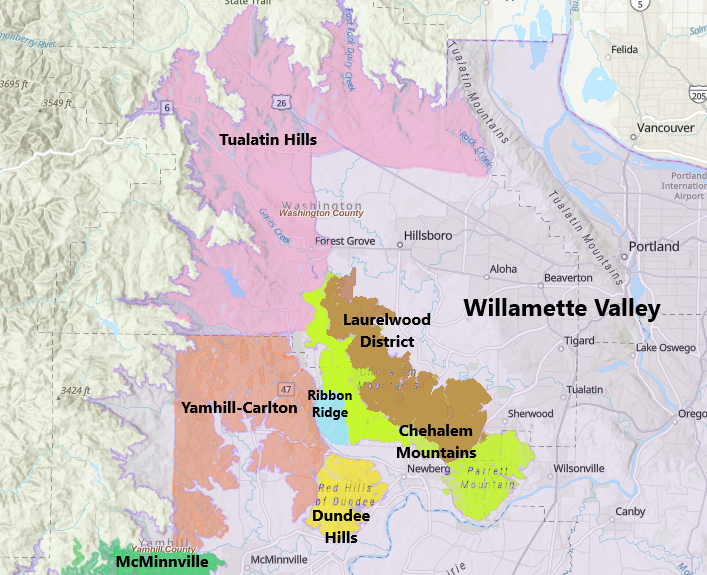
- Northern AVAs
- Type: American Viticultural Area
- Year established: 2004
- Years of wine industry: 60
- Country: United States
- Part of: Oregon, Willamette Valley AVA
- Other regions in Oregon, Willamette Valley AVA: Chehalem Mountains AVA, Eola-Amity Hills AVA, Laurelwood District AVA, Lower Long Tom AVA, McMinnville AVA, Mount Pisgah, Polk County, Oregon AVA, Ribbon Ridge AVA, Tualatin Hills AVA, Van Duzer Corridor AVA, Yamhill-Carlton District AVA
- Growing season: 223 days
- Climate region: Region Ib-II
- Heat units: 2,282-2,601 GDD units
- Precipitation (annual average): 30 to 45 inches (760–1,140 mm)
- Soil conditions: Jory series reddish silt, clay and loam soils
- Total area: 6,490 acres (10 sq mi)
- Size of planted vineyards: 1,300 acres (526 ha)
- No. of vineyards: 28
- Grapes produced: Chardonnay, Melon, Müller-Thurgau, Pinot Blanc, Pinot Gris, Pinot Noir, Riesling
- No. of wineries: 3

Dundee Hills is an American Viticultural Area (AVA) located within Yamhill County, Oregon and the Willamette Valley landform lying approximately 28 miles (45 km) southwest of Portland and 40 miles (64 km) inland from the Pacific Ocean near the town of Newberg. It was established as the nation's 156^{th}, the state's eighth and the valley's second wine appellation on November 30, 2004 by the Alcohol and Tobacco Tax and Trade Bureau (TTB), Treasury after reviewing the petition submitted by Alex Sokol Blosser, secretary of the North Willamette Valley AVA Group, proposing a viticultural area in Yamhill County named "Red Hills." The petitioner subsequently amended the area's name to "Dundee Hills."

The Dundee Hills are a north–south oriented range of hills on the western side of the Willamette River valley. The soil is Jory series reddish silt, clay and loam, moderately fertile and well-drained suitable for grape cultivation. The region gets 30 to 45 inches (760–1,140 mm) of rainfall per year. The Chehalem Mountains to the north protect the region from the cool breezes that enter Willamette Valley from the Columbia Gorge. Dundee Hills has been a grape growing region since 1966, when David Lett established Eyrie Vineyards, planting Pinot Noir and Pinot Gris. At the outset, the 6,940-acre (2,809 ha) viticultural area cultivated 1,500 acres (610 ha) with over 25 wineries and independent vineyards producing over 44,000 cases of wine.

== Terroir ==
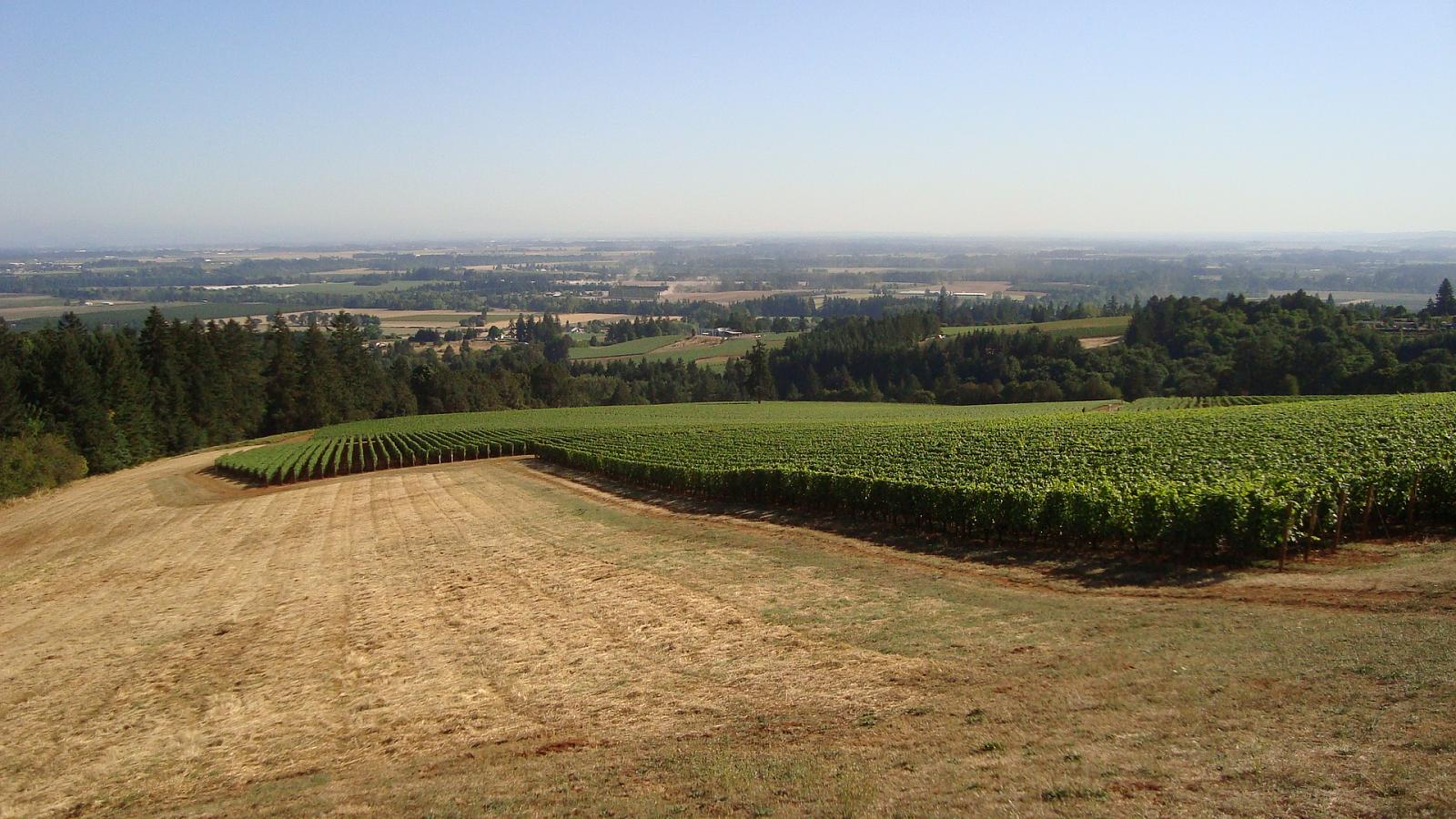
Dundee Hills' Domaine Drouhin vineyards

=== Topography ===
Elevation, terrain, climate, and soil factors distinguish the Dundee Hills viticultural area from the grape-growing regions found on the surrounding valley floors. Its elevation rises from the 200-foot (61 m) contour line to the highest hill's peak of 1,067 feet (325 m) and used for most of the boundary between the Dundee Hills viticultural area and the surrounding, lower and flatter valley floors. These heights contrast with the lower elevation Chehalem and Willamette Valleys, which flank the north, east, and south sides of the viticultural area. The area's western boundary, along Abbey and Kuehne Roads, is marked by a natural depression with drainage south to the Yamhill River via Millican Creek, while a smaller unnamed drainage flows north into the Chehalem Valley. The Dundee Hills viticultural area's topography consists of a north-south spine with ridges and small valleys on the east, south and west 1sides of the landmass. This hilly area is above the Willamette and Chehalem Valleys' flood plains. Numerous small streams originate in the Dundee area's higher elevations and the area is dotted with small reservoirs. Light-duty and unimproved roads service the Dundee Hills area.
The geological history of the Dundee Hills area dates back 66 million years with the uplifting of the North American tectonic plate, which formed the Coast Range mountains and the inland ridges and valleys. Lava flows, dating back 15 million years, pushed into the area from northeast Oregon, depositing Columbia River basalts and restructuring the landscape with hills and broken ridges. To the west, the huge uplifted mass of the Coast Range parallels the Pacific coastline. Between the Coast Range on the west, and the Dundee Hills to the east, is the inland Yamhill-Carlton viticultural area. The Yamhill-Carlton area has small uplifted slopes that drain entirely into the Yamhill River system, while only the west side of the Dundee Hills area drains into this watershed. To the north, the Chehalem Mountains, with an east to west orientation, have a large footprint and cover more surface area than Dundee Hills. These taller mountains provide the Dundee Hills viticultural area with some protection from the climatic extremes found further to the north. To the east and immediate south of the Dundee Hills viticultural area, the lower-elevation Willamette Valley floor has different soils and growing conditions, and is subject to standing water in the winter and spring. The Eola Hills, 20 miles (32 km) south of the Dundee area, have a north-south orientation, a large footprint, and a strongly marine-influenced climate.

=== Climate ===
The Dundee Hills viticultural area, with warmer nights and less frost than the adjacent valley floors, is protected from great climatic variations by surrounding geographic features. To the north, the tall Chehalem Mountains buffer the climatic influence of the Columbia River Gorge, which funnels cold air in the winter and warm air in the summer into the Willamette Valley from the interior of northern Oregon. In addition, the Willamette Valley, located to the east and south of the Dundee Hills area, has spring and fall fog and frost, which is created as cool night air drains from the hillsides onto the valley floor.
The Coast Range, to the west of the Dundee Hills area, lessens the harsh effects of the Pacific Ocean's heavy rains and windstorms, and causes a rain shadow effect in the Dundee Hills area. Annually, the Coast Range receives 90 to 135 inches (2,286–3,429 mm) of rain, while the Dundee Hills area gets about a third that much, 30 to 45 inches (762–1,143 mm) annually.
The Yamhill-Carlton viticultural area, located between the Coast Range and the Dundee Hills area, has a stronger marine-influenced climate, with more wind and rainfall, than the Dundee Hills viticultural area. The Yamhill-Carlton region averages 60 inches (1,524 mm) of annual precipitation and has 150 fewer degree-growing days than the Dundee area. The Eola Hills, 20 miles to the south of the Dundee Hills, receive a strong cooling marine influence that pushes inland from the Pacific Ocean through the Van Duzer Corridor, an opening in the Coast Range. This marine effect loses most of its cooling benefit before reaching the Dundee Hills viticultural area. The plant hardiness zone ranges from 8b to 9a.

=== Soils ===
The "Soil Survey of the Yamhill Area, Oregon," issued by the U.S. Department of Agriculture's Soil Conservation Service in January 1974, documents that the reddish color in the Dundee Hills area's soil is derived from the Columbia River basalt lava, including the Jory soil series, which cover approximately 80 percent of the area. These lava-based soils decompose quickly with the high rain amounts found in northwestern Oregon, which helps produce the area's Jory series of reddish silt, clay, and loam soils. This soil series, found predominantly on the Dundee Hills' eastern side, is moderately fertile and well drained, with slight to moderate erosion levels. The sedimentary Willakenzie soil series covers the steeper slopes of the Dundee Hills area's western side. This soil series is categorized as well drained with moderate to high erosion levels. A smaller amount of the Jory soil series exists on the area's western side where the Columbia River lava flows cover the sedimentary formations. Outside the Dundee Hills viticultural area's boundary, the soils of the Coast Range, the Yamhill-Carlton area, the Chehalem Mountains, the Willamette Valley floor, and the Eola Hills contrast with the soils found within the Dundee Hills area. The Coast Range to the west has marine volcanic and sedimentary soils, with high water holding capacity silts and basalt layers sandwiched between marine sediments. The Yamhill-Carlton region, to the Dundee area's west and northwest, has soils derived from marine sediments and ocean floor volcanic basalt with high water holding capacity. The Chehalem Mountains, to the north and northeast, have the Columbia River basalt, ocean sedimentation, and wind-blown loess derivation soil types. The Willamette Valley floor, to the east and south, has deep, alluvial soils with high water holding capacity. In the Eola Hills region to the south, low water holding capacity, slow permeability, and moderate erosion levels characterize the predominant Gelderman and Ritner basalt soil series found there.

== See also ==
- Red Hills of Dundee
