= McMinnville AVA =

American Viticultural Area in Oregon

Coordinates: 45°08′24″N 123°17′35″W

McMinnville
- Wine region
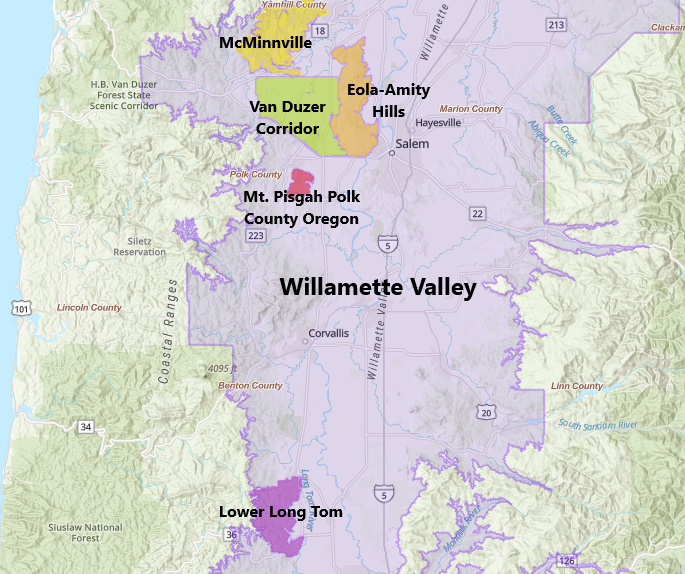
- Southern AVAs
- Type: American Viticultural Area
- Year established: 2005
- Country: United States
- Part of: Oregon, Willamette Valley AVA
- Other regions in Oregon, Willamette Valley AVA: Chehalem Mountains AVA, Dundee Hills AVA, Eola-Amity Hills AVA, Laurelwood District AVA, Lower Long Tom AVA, Mount Pisgah, Polk County, Oregon AVA, Ribbon Ridge AVA, Tualatin Hills AVA, Van Duzer Corridor AVA, Yamhill-Carlton District AVA
- Growing season: 145-200 days
- Climate region: Region Ib
- Heat units: 2,178 GDD units
- Precipitation (annual average): 41.66 inches (1,100 mm)
- Soil conditions: Marine sandstone and mudstone with intrusions of marine basalts
- Total area: 40,500 acres (63 sq mi)
- Size of planted vineyards: 750 acres (304 ha)
- No. of vineyards: 16
- Grapes produced: Pinot Blanc, Pinot Gris, Pinot Noir, Riesling
- No. of wineries: 4

"'McMinnville"' is an American Viticultural Area (AVA) located in Yamhill County, Oregon within the vast Willamette Valley landform approximately 40 miles (64 km) southwest of Portland, just west of the city of McMinnville and north of the village of Sheridan. It was established as the nation's 159^{th}, the state's eleventh and the valley's fourth appellation on January 18, 2005 by the Alcohol and Tobacco Tax and Trade Bureau (TTB), Treasury after reviewing the petition submitted by Kevin Byrd of Youngberg Hill Vineyards proposing a viticultural area in Yamhill County to be named "McMinnville."
The viticultural area is named for the city of McMinnville, the county seat of Yamhill County, which is located at its northeastern boundary. McMinnville is one of few appellations whose boundaries only designate acreage between elevations, 200 to 1,000 feet (61–305 m) above sea level, where the soil and rock formations differ from surrounding areas. Primarily uplifted marine sedimentary loams and silt, the top soil is shallow and relatively infertile. According to the petitioner, there were 14 wineries and 523 acres (212 ha) under vine. McMinnville is the third sub-appellation established within the Willamette Valley viticultural area.

== History ==
Historical information on the name "McMinnville" is noted from Oregon Geographic Names by Lewis A. McArthur (Oregon Historical Society, 1982). Mr. McArthur stated:

McMinnville was named by William T. Newby, who was born in McMinnville, Warren County, Tennessee, in 1820, and came to Oregon in 1843. He settled near the present site of McMinnville early in 1844, and in 1853 built a grist mill and founded the town. In 1854 he started a store. He was county assessor in 1848 and state senator in 1870. McMinville post office was established on May 29, 1855, with Elbrige G. Edson postmaster. The name was later changed to the present spelling.

== Terroir ==
=== Topography ===
The McMinnville viticultural area's boundaries encompass Gopher Valley, Dupee Valley, Muddy Valley, and the surrounding hills, all geographically part of the eastern foothills of the Coast Range. All land within the viticultural area is above the 200-foot (61 m) elevation. According to the petitioner, this higher elevation causes the McMinnville viticultural area to have distinctive soils and climate when compared to the lower parts of the Willamette Valley. Below the 200-foot (61 m) elevation line the Willamette silt-based soils create growing conditions substantially different from those in the viticultural area. The greater depth, water-holding capacity, and fertility of soils at these lower elevations extends the vegetative period of the vine and delays ripening of vineyards planted at those elevations. In addition, the petitioner noted that elevations below 200 feet (61 m) are more prone to frost when compared to the higher elevations. Initially, the petitioner proposed to exclude from the McMinnville viticultural area any land above 800 feet (244 m) in elevation falling within the proposed boundaries, due to climatic differences with land below that elevation. In particular, the petitioner stated that land above 800 feet (244 m) experiences fewer degree growing days than lower elevations do, thus preventing the reliable ripening of wine grapes. Because of the unusual nature of the boundary proposal, TTB specifically asked for comments regarding the proposed McMinnville viticultural area boundaries. Mystic Mountain Vineyards submitted two comments disagreeing with the proposed elevation limitation—one signed by Linda Lindsay, the other by Arthur Lindsay. Mr. Lindsay noted that he and his wife own a vineyard within the proposed McMinnville viticultural area's boundary, but at an elevation of 1,200 feet (366 m). He stated that their records, dating back to 1999, show that their vineyard's degree growing days are sufficient to ripen their yearly crop. While Mr. Lindsay acknowledged that their vineyard's daily high temperatures are lower than those of vineyards at lower elevations, he argued that their nighttime temperatures are generally higher than those at lower elevations during the growing season. He pointed out that since degree growing days are calculated on a 24-hour basis, the degree growing days for their vineyard's elevation are as high as those found at lower elevations.
TTB believes that the information presented by the commenters provides an adequate basis for amending the McMinnville viticultural area boundary originally proposed. Accordingly, the proposed restriction limiting the McMinnville viticultural area to land below 800 feet within the described boundary has been eliminated in this final rule. All land within the described boundary is included within the McMinnville viticultural area regardless of elevation.

=== Climate ===
The McMinnville viticultural area's location just east of the Coast Range and northeast of the Van Duzer Corridor greatly affects its growing season temperatures and precipitation. The petitioner submitted temperature and precipitation data from the Oregon Climate Service comparing McMinnville with two other sites in the western Willamette Valley—Dallas, Oregon, to the south of McMinnville, and Scoggins Dam, to the north. The submitted data showed that McMinnville is, on average, warmer and drier than Dallas and Scoggins Dam McMinnville averaged 2,178 degree growing days above 50 degrees (each degree that a day's mean temperature is above 50 degrees F counts as one degree day) during the growing season for the years 1971–2000, with average yearly precipitation of 41.66 inches (1,058 mm). Dallas, for the same period, averaged 2,116 degree growing days above 50 degrees, with precipitation of 49.13 inches (1,248 mm). Scoggins Dam, for the period, averaged 1,974 degree growing days above 50 degrees, with precipitation of 50.68 inches (1,287 mm). The petitioner explained that cooler and wetter conditions south of McMinnville viticultural area are due to the Van Duzer Corridor, a pass through Oregon's Coast Range. Cool, wet marine air flows inland through this pass, causing cooler, wetter growing conditions in areas east of the pass. North and west of McMinnville, at Scoggins Dam for example, the petition stated that the land makes a rapid transition to the slopes of the Coast Range, which has much cooler temperatures and greater rainfall. The USDA plant hardiness zones are 8b and 9a.

=== Soils ===
According to the petitioner, the soils and geology of the McMinnville viticultural area are different from those in surrounding areas, thus providing distinctive growing conditions for the area's grapes. To demonstrate the soil differences, the petitioner submitted soil survey maps published by the Soil Conservation Service of the U.S. Department of Agriculture. Several types of shallow, less than 40-inch deep (102 cm), silty clay and clay loams that exhibit low total available moisture characterize the McMinnville viticultural area. These soils, primarily Yamhill, Nekia, Peavine, Willakenzie, and Hazelair, all have a typical depth to base materials of between 20 and 40 inches (51–102 cm), while the average total available moisture for these soils ranges from 4.8 to 6.3 inches (12–16 cm).
To the west and northwest of the McMinnville viticultural area, the petition notes, the soils transition to those of the Olyic and Hembre associations. While these soils are also shallow silty clay and clay loams, they tend to be acidic. To the north of the McMinnville area (within another viticultural area named Yamhill-Carlton District), a greater percentage of the soils are of the Woodburn-Willamette association. These soils are of greater depth, 60 inches (152 cm), and have higher available moisture (12 to 13 inches (30–33 cm)). The Woodburn-Willamette soils also predominate to the south and southwest of the McMinnville area. The petitioner stated that the most distinctive geological feature within the McMinnville viticultural area is the Nestucca Formation, a 2,000-foot (610 m) thick bedrock formation that extends west from the city of McMinnville to the slopes of the Coast Range. This formation contains marine sandstone and mudstone with intrusions of marine basalts. These intrusions differentiate the formation from the pure basaltic parent materials found under the Red Hills and Chehalem Mountains and the pure marine sedimentary materials of the Yamhill Formation found on the valley floor. Because of these marine basalts, the petition notes that the ground water composition of the McMinnville viticultural area is significantly different from that of areas to the east. According to data obtained from Oregon State University's Drinking Water Program, it contains greater dissolved sodium (66 mg/L vs. 16 mg/L), less dissolved potassium (0.9 mg/L vs. 3.8 mg/L), and greater dissolved boron (230 μg/L vs. 20 μg/L) than the ground water east of McMinnville. The petitioner asserts that significant variations in these component materials can result in grapes with unique flavor and development characteristics.
