= Eola-Amity Hills AVA =

American Viticultural Area in Oregon

Coordinates: 45°03′31″N 123°06′20″W

Eola-Amity Hills
- Wine region
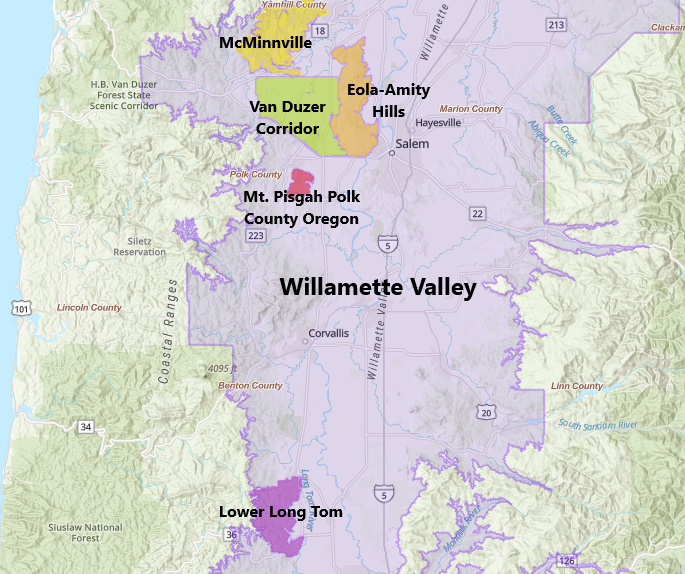
- Southern AVAs
- Type: American Viticultural Area
- Year established: 2006
- Country: United States
- Part of: Oregon, Willamette Valley AVA
- Other regions in Oregon, Willamette Valley AVA: Chehalem Mountains AVA, Dundee Hills AVA, Laurelwood District AVA, Lower Long Tom AVA, McMinnville AVA, Mt. Pisgah, Polk County, Oregon AVA, Ribbon Ridge AVA, Tualatin Hills AVA, Van Duzer Corridor AVA, Yamhill-Carlton District AVA
- Growing season: 173 days
- Climate region: Region I
- Heat units: 2,300-2,500 GDD units
- Precipitation (annual average): 40 to 45 inches (1,016–1,143 mm)
- Soil conditions: Swallow well-drained basalt-derived
- Total area: 37,900 acres (59 sq mi)
- Size of planted vineyards: 2,850 acres (1,153 ha)
- No. of vineyards: 138
- Grapes produced: Chardonnay, Gamay Noir, Pinot Blanc, Pinot Gris, Pinot Noir, Riesling
- No. of wineries: 58

Eola-Amity Hills is an American Viticultural Area (AVA) located in Polk and Yamhill Counties, Oregon entirely within the Willamette Valley landform whose acreage extends from the city of Amity in the north to Salem in the south. It was established as the nation's 178^{th}, the state's fourteenth and the valley's sixth wine appellation on July 17, 2006 by the Alcohol and Tobacco Tax and Trade Bureau (TTB), Treasury after reviewing the petition submitted by Mr. Russell Raney of Evesham Wood Vineyard and Mr. Ted Casteel of Bethel Heights Vineyard, both of Salem, proposed the viticultural area to be named "Eola Hills."
After careful consideration of the evidence submitted in support of the petition and the public comments received, TTB ruled that there is a substantial basis for the establishment of the viticultural area under the name "Eola-Amity Hills."
At the outset, the AVA had about 1,244 acres (503 ha) under vine of the overall 37,900 acres (59 sq mi), however, as of 2025, cultivation has increased to 2,850 acres (1,153 ha). Like most of the Willamette Valley, the Eola-Amity Hills experiences a maritime climate that includes mild winters but summers that are cooler and wetter than the continental climate experienced by Washington State's wine regions to the north and the Mediterranean climate experienced by many of California's wine regions to the south.

The Eola and Amity Hills cover an area west of the Willamette River approximately 15 miles (24 km) long by six miles (10 km) wide. The Eola-Amity Hills area benefits from steady winds off the Pacific Ocean that reach the Willamette Valley through the Van Duzer Corridor, a gap in the Oregon Coast Range, moderating the summer temperatures. The Eola Hills were named after the community of Eola, whose name was derived from Aeolus, the Greek god of the winds The climate is influenced by the Pacific currents that escape through the Van Duzer corridor gap between the Oregon Coastal Range and the Cascade Range to the east which keeps many weather currents from going much further east. Through the Van Duzer, cool Pacific air comes more than 30 miles (48 km) from the west in the afternoon to cool down the region, allowing the grapes to retain higher levels of acidity.

The majority of the year's rainfall comes between October and April with the peak months of growing season being relatively dry. However, harvest time in late September and October can bring the hazard of rain, grape rot and dilution caused by the vines absorbing too much water from the wet soils and funneling that into the grape berries. Additionally, migrating birds heading south for the winter will often prey upon ripening grape clusters as a food source.

The vineyard soils of the Eola-Amity hills include volcanic soils and shallow Nekia series over ancient basalt beds. Throughout the AVA are soil deposits left over from the Missoula floods.

== Terroir ==
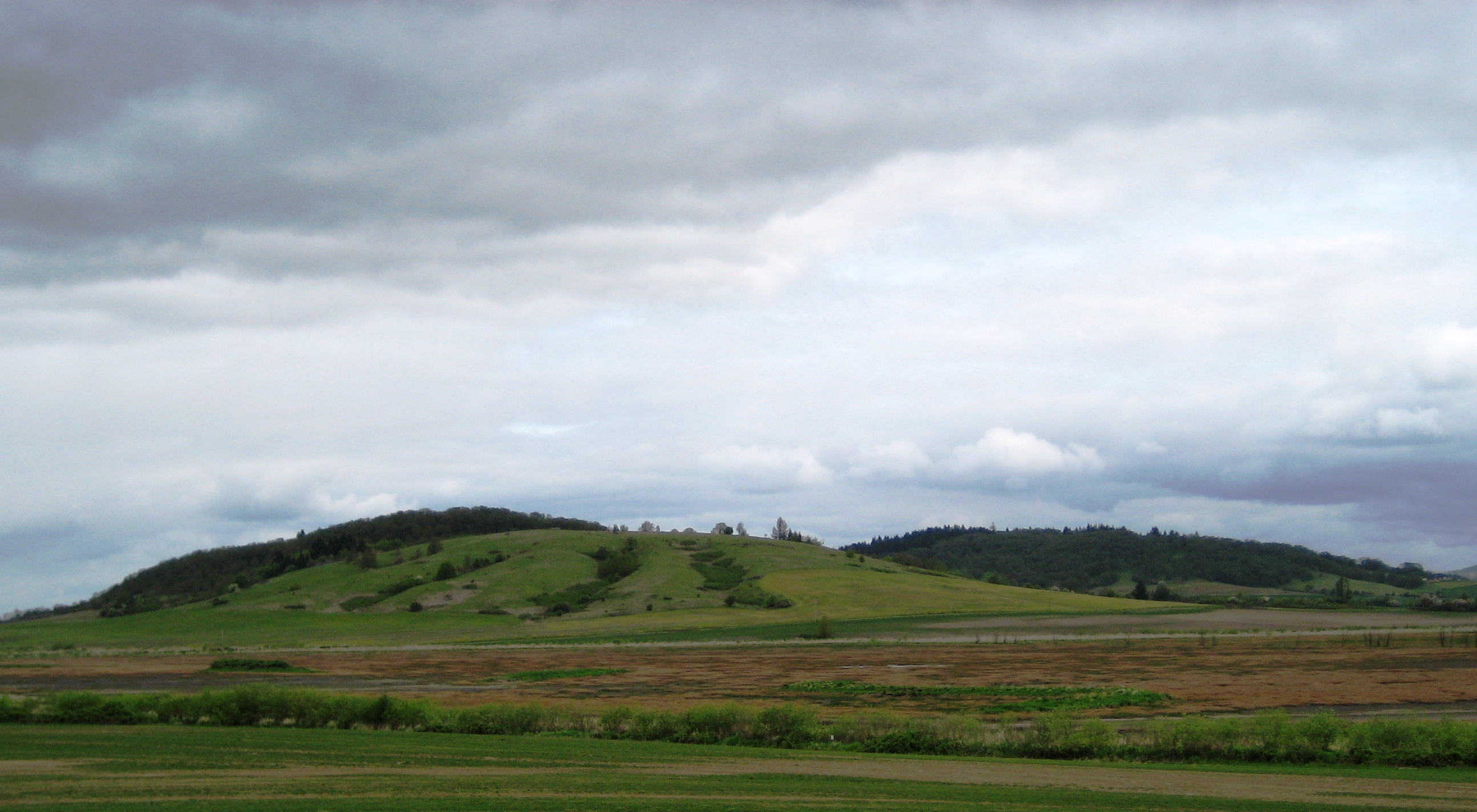
Eola Hills north of Dallas in Polk County

=== Topography ===
The main ridge of the Eola Hills runs north-south and has numerous lateral ridges that run east-west on both sides. Slopes on the west side of the ridge tend to be somewhat steeper and pocketed, and they fall away below an elevation of 200 feet (61 m) more abruptly than the slopes on the east side, which tend to be gentler and more extensive. Both sides, however, provide vineyard sites with very similar soils and growing conditions. The highest point in the south end of the hills is 1,093 feet (333 m). In the central area, near the Polk-Yamhill County line, the ridge peaks at around 1,160 feet (354 m); in the north, it peaks at 863 feet (263 m). The majority of vineyards in the Eola Hills are at elevations ranging from 250 to 700 feet (76–213 m), although suitable sites, given proper sun exposure and microclimate, are found above these elevations. Most vineyards in the Eola Hills have a southern, southwestern, or southeastern orientation. However, on gently sloping terrain, east- and west-facing sites are also capable of producing high quality wine grapes.

=== Climate ===
The Eola Hills are blessed with a temperate climate. Summers are warm, but seldom excessively hot; winters are mild, and in winter, temperatures are usually above freezing. Annual rainfall ranges from under 40 inches (1,016 mm) on the southeastern edge of the Eola Hills to more than 45 inches (1,143 mm) in the higher elevations. More important, only about 15 percent of the total annual rainfall in the mid-Willamette Valley occurs from April through September. Thus, rainfall averages during the growing season are uniform throughout the Eola Hills. The petitioners state that the Eola Hills are influenced more by their position due east of the Van Duzer corridor than by their location in the rain shadow of the Coast Range. Summer ocean winds vented through the corridor often cause dramatic late afternoon drops in temperature, which further distinguish the area from the hills further north. During the growing season, average maximum temperatures at the middle elevations range from 62 °F (17 °C) in April to 83 °F (28 °C) in July. These factors contribute to the ideal conditions for the "cool-climate" grape varieties that dominate in Eola Hills vineyards, such as Pinot Noir, Pinot Gris, and Chardonnay. The petitioners note that due to the effects of thermal inversion, during the growing season heat accumulation is greater on the slopes of the Eola Hills than on the floor of the surrounding Willamette Valley. Cool air, which drains toward the valley floor during the night, layers warmer air on the lower slopes. The petitioners submitted monthly heat accumulation data that compared a site at the Salem, OR airport on the valley floor with a site at the Seven Springs Vineyard in the Eola Hills for the years 1992–95. The data showed that, for those years, seasonal heat accumulation at the Seven Springs Vineyard site was consistently higher than that at the Salem airport site. Typically, the Seven Springs Vineyard site in the Eola Hills has, during the growing season (April 1 to October 31), a heat accumulation range of 2,300–2,500 degree days, with a base of 60 °F (16 °C). Based on standards for determining climatic regions using temperature summation, this heat accumulation range places the vineyard high in the Region 1 category (2,500 degree days or less). The USDA plant hardiness zone is 8b.

=== Soils and Geology ===
The petitioners state that the soils and geology of the Eola Hills, compared to those of the surrounding areas, are distinctive in two regards. The petitioners note that the prevailing basalt-derived soils of the Eola Hills are shallower than the soils of other hills in the north Willamette Valley, and that these well drained basalt soils are very different from the alluvial soils of the surrounding valley floor. As evidence of these differences, the petitioners submitted two geologic maps issued by the State of Oregon's Department of Geology and Mineral Industries. One is entitled Geologic Map of the Rickreall and Salem Quadrangles, Oregon; the other is entitled Preliminary Geologic Map of the Amity and Mission Bottom Quadrangles, Oregon. According to these documents, volcanic basalt rock from the lava flows of the Miocene epoch underlies the Eola Hills, and marine sedimentary rock of the Oligocene epoch underlies areas at the lower elevations of the ridge. The soils at the middle and higher elevations of the Eola Hills are largely well drained silty clay loams weathered from basalt; those on the lower slopes are silt loams weathered predominantly from sedimentary rock, particularly on the west-facing slopes. According to soil survey maps issued by the U.S. Department of Agriculture, Soil Conservation Service, the dominant basalt-derived soils on the Eola Hills are Nekia soils (recently reclassified as Gelderman soils) and Ritner and Jory soils. The preponderance of the shallower Nekia and Gelderman soils in the Eola Hills differentiates the Eola Hills from the Red Hills farther north, where Jory soils are predominant. Nekia and Gelderman soils have a much lower available water capacity than Jory soils. The most common sedimentary soils on the Eola Hills are Steiwer, Chehulpum, and Helmick soils, especially on the west side of the ridge. Also in the Eola Hills are soils formed in alluvial deposits, the most common of which are the silt loam Woodburn soils. Such alluvial soils generally are only at the lowest elevations of the viticultural area below 300 ft (91 m). Like the soils mentioned above, these alluvial soils also are suitable for wine grapes if they are on slopes steep enough for good water drainage. Finally, the Eola Hills are surrounded on almost all sides by, and are easily distinguished from, terraces of the Willamette Valley. With few exceptions, the terraces lie below the 200-foot (61 m) elevation line and are characterized by less drained alluvial soils. According to the petitioners, the soils on these terraces generally are not suitable for the cultivation of premium wine grapes. Therefore, land below an elevation of 200 feet (61 m) is not included within the Eola Hills boundary.

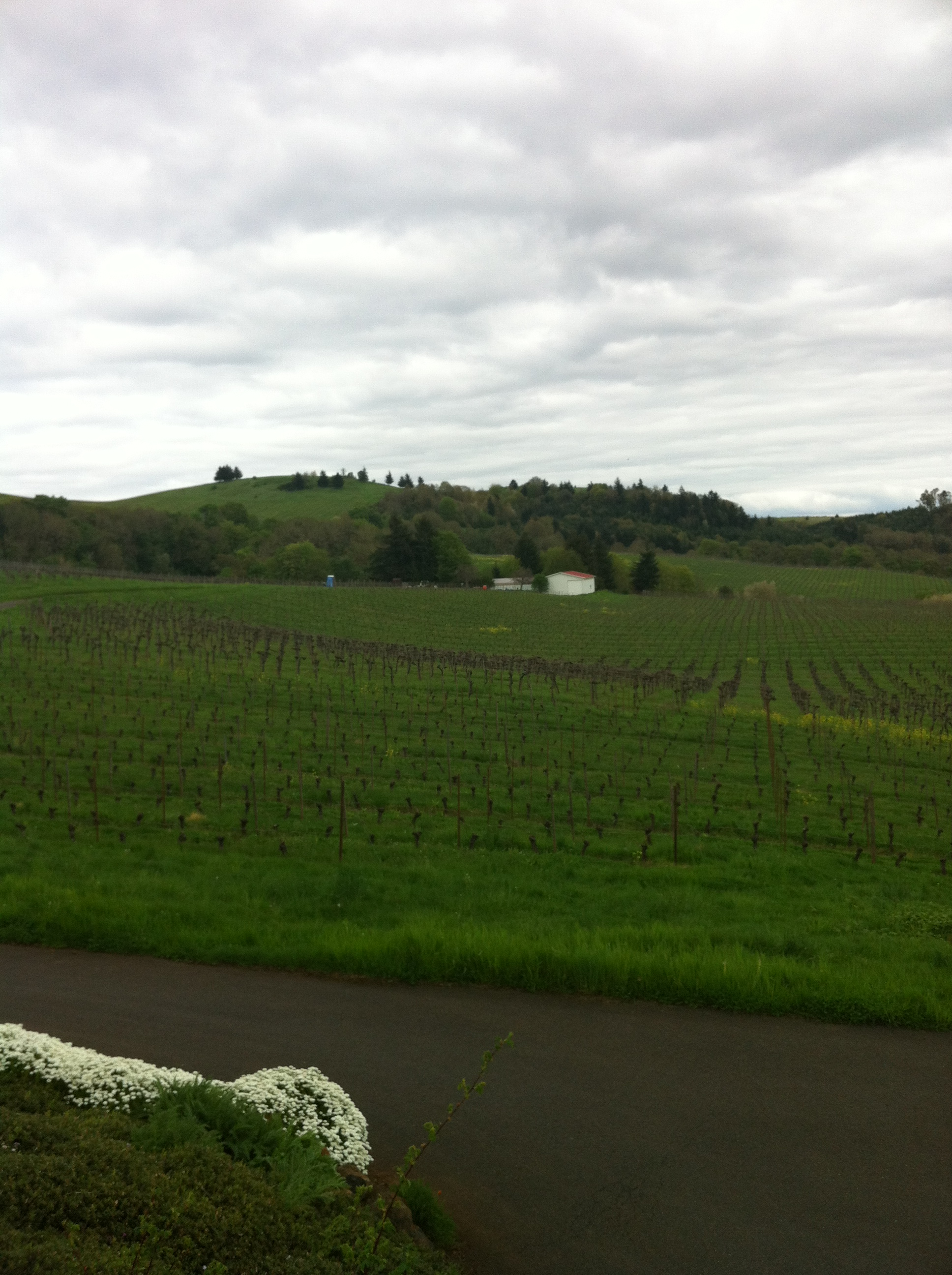
A vineyard block at Bethel Heights in the Eola-Amity Hills AVA.

== Vineyards ==
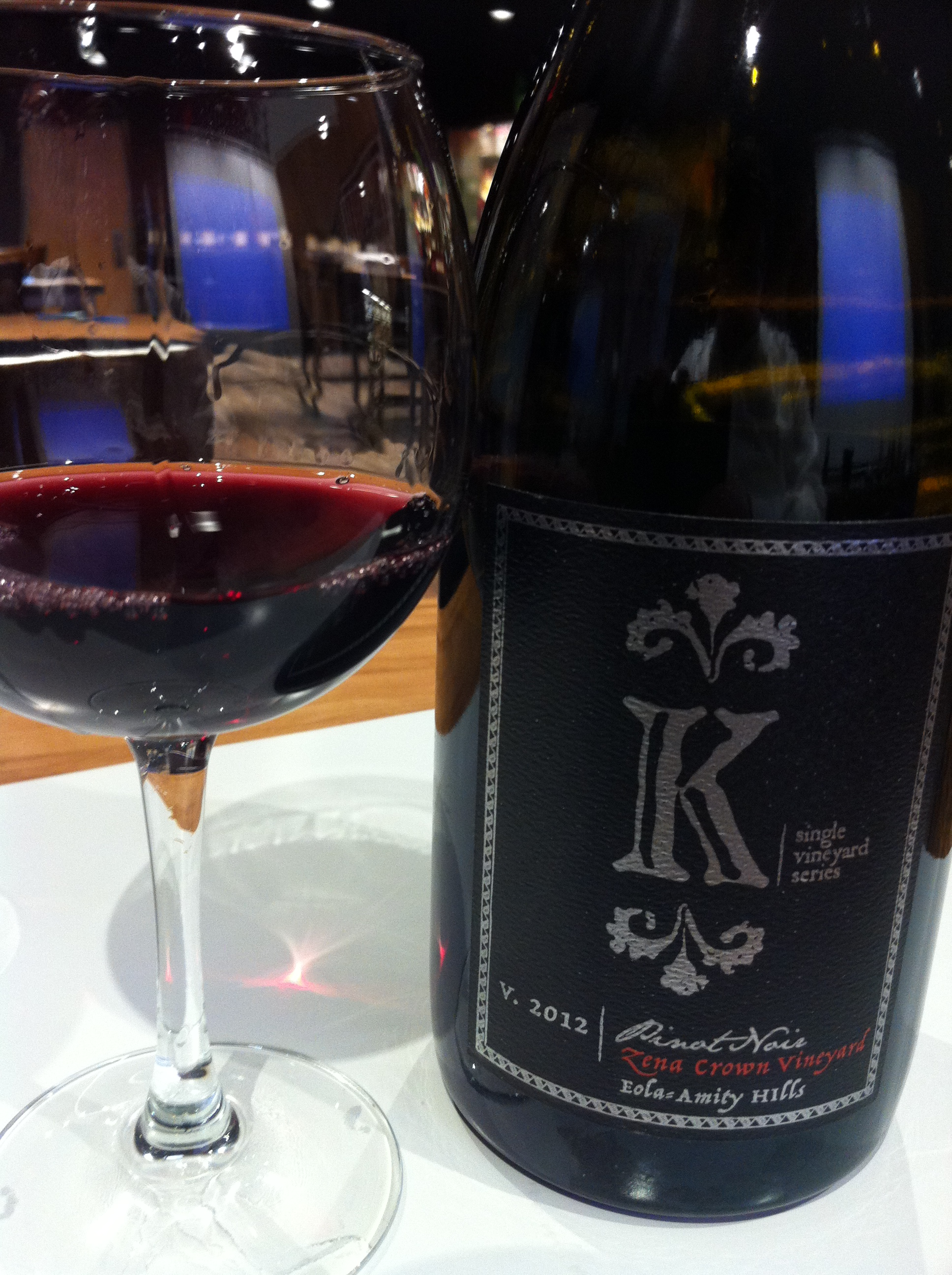
Pinot noir from the Zena Crown vineyard in the Eola-Amity Hills.

Eola-Amity Hills include several notable vineyards that have been provided grapes to wineries in other Oregon AVAs for years. One of the first vineyards planted in the region was Bethel Heights Vineyard, northwest of Salem, planted by pioneer grape grower, Victor Winquist, in 1977. Among the Eola-Amity Hills vineyards that will appear on vineyard designated wines include Temperance Hill Vineyard with 100 acres (40 ha) located northwest of Salem, Zenith Vineyard that was first planted in 1982; Zena Crown located centrally in the Eola-Amity Hills with 83.5 acres (34 ha) that were first planted in 2003.

In 2013, Jackson Family Wines announced it had purchased the Zena East and Zena Middle vineyards, consisting of 42.5 acres (17.2 ha) of Pinot noir grapes; the purchase was part of the "first large-scale acquisition of Oregon vineyard lands by a California winemaker."

As of 2025, there are 138 vineyards and 58 wineries with numerous tasting rooms in the Eola-Amity Hills. Pinot noir is the most widely planted variety with over 2,850 acres (1,153 ha); there are 66.4 acres (27 ha) of Chardonnay; 48 acres (19 ha) of Pinot gris and platings of Riesling, Muscat, Syrah, Dolcetto, Tempranillo, Auxerrois, Viognier, Pinot blanc, Gewürztraminer and Carmine - each less than 10 planted acres.
