= Yamhill-Carlton AVA =

American Viticultural Area in Oregon

Coordinates: 45°25′10″N 123°11′19″W

Yamhill-Carlton
- Wine region
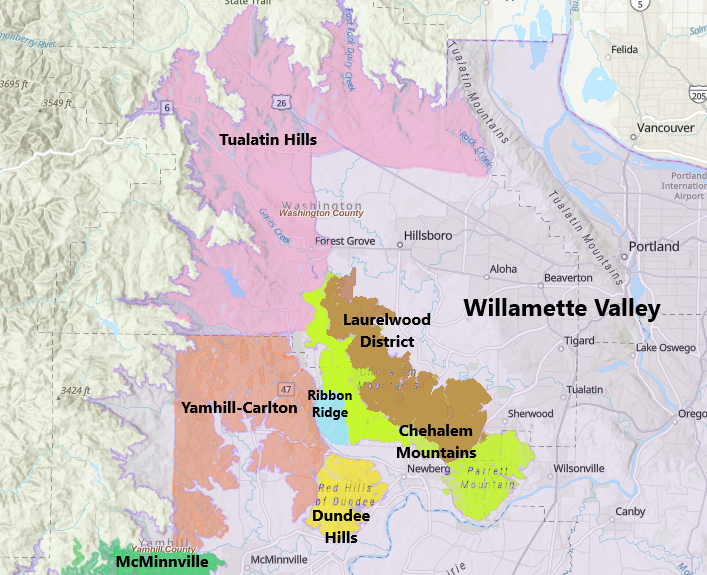
- Type: American Viticultural Area
- Year established: 2004; 2010 Amend
- Years of wine industry: 52
- Country: United States
- Part of: Oregon, Willamette Valley AVA
- Other regions in Oregon, Willamette Valley AVA: Chehalem Mountains AVA, Dundee Hills AVA, Eola-Amity Hills AVA, Laurelwood District AVA, Lower Long Tom AVA, McMinnville AVA, Mount Pisgah, Polk County, Oregon AVA, Ribbon Ridge AVA, Tualatin Hills AVA, Van Duzer Corridor AVA
- Growing season: 197 days
- Climate region: Region Ib
- Heat units: 2,300 GDD units
- Precipitation (annual average): 42 inches (1,067 mm)
- Soil conditions: Coarse-grain, ancient marine sedimentary silt-loam
- Total area: 8,500 acres (13 sq mi)
- Size of planted vineyards: 2,844 acres (1,151 ha)
- No. of vineyards: 127
- Grapes produced: Chardonnay, Dolcetto, Melon de Bourgogne, Muscat, Muller Thurgau, Pinot Blanc, Pinot Gris, Pinot Noir, Viognier
- No. of wineries: 63

Yamhill-Carlton is an American Viticultural Area (AVA) located in Yamhill and Washington Counties, Oregon within the vast Willamette Valley landform about 35 miles (56 km) southwest of Portland, and 25 miles (40 km) inland from the Pacific Ocean. It was established as the nation's 158^{th}, the state's tenth and the valley's third wine appellation on December 9, 2004 by the Alcohol and Tobacco Tax and Trade Bureau (TTB), Treasury after reviewing the petition submitted by Alex Sokol-Blosser, Secretary of the North Willamette Valley AVA Group, on behalf of Yamhill-Carlton District winegrowers, proposing a new viticultural area to be called the "Yamhill-Carlton District."

The appellation lies entirely within the Willamette Valley AVA and emcompasses the towns of Carlton and Yamhill. The surrounding mountain ridges are a series of horseshoe-shaped eroded hills composed of sedimentary parent material where most of the vineyards are located on south-facing slopes. The area only includes acreage between 200 and 1,000 feet (61–305 m) above sea level yielding a size of 8,500 acres (13 sq mi).

In 2010, the TTB favorably ruled on a 2008 petition submitted by Mr. Ken Wright, of Ken Wright Cellars, to change the name of the viticultural area from "Yamhill-Carlton District" to "Yamhill-Carlton." In the petition, Wright asserted that when the viticultural area was originally proposed "[t]he inclusion of the word "" was completely discretionary and added only to enforce the idea of the AVA being a regionalized area." Further, he stated that "[h]istorically, the area has always been referred to as simply "Yamhill-Carlton." Additionally, the length of the current name is very difficult to fit on a [wine] label. Many wineries have found it impossible, given their current label graphics, to utilize the name."

The Yamhill-Carlton soil is some of the oldest in the Willamette Valley where ancient marine sediments creates unique conditions for viticulture. The region is in the rain shadow of the 3,500 feet (1,067 m) Oregon Coast Range, a short distance to the west. As of 2025, the appellation contains 127 vineyards cultivating 2,844 acres (1,151 ha) of primarily Pinot noir, Pinot gris, and Chardonnay sourcing 63 area wineries.

== Name Evidence ==
The "Yamhill-Carlton" (//ˈjæmhɪl-ˈkɑːrltən// YAM-hill-KARL-ton) viticultural area surrounds the towns of Yamhill and Carlton, Oregon, which lie three miles (5 km) apart along State Route 47 in Yamhill County. While the two towns operate independently, they have had strong ties since their separate incorporations over 120 years ago. The hyphenated expression of the cities' names has been used since 1853 with the establishment of the Yamhill-Carlton Pioneer Cemetery.
In modern times, the Yamhill-Carlton Union High School has existed since 1955 and operates under the supervision of the Yamhill-Carlton School . The two cities share a newspaper, the Carlton-Yamhill Review. The USGS Carlton map identifies the towns of Yamhill and Carlton and the Yamhill-Carlton Pioneer Cemetery.

== History ==
In modern times, two vineyards can lay claim to being first planted in the Yamhill-Carlton viticultural area. In 1974, Roy and Betty Wahle planted eight acres (3 ha)s of vinifera grapes, and, that same year, Pat and Joe Campbell of Elk Cove Vineyards also planted an eight-acre (3 ha) vineyard. In 1977, Elk Grove Estate produced the first commercial wine in the Yamhill-Carlton area, and as of the 2002 Yamhill-Carlton District petition, there were 26 vineyards within the area, with about 650 acres (263 ha) under vine.

== Terroir ==
=== Topography ===
Geographically, the Yamhill-Carlton viticultural area is a south- facing bowl containing a series of horseshoe-shaped eroded hills composed of sedimentary parent material. To the area's west is the higher-elevation Coast Range, to the south is a cooler maritime-influenced area, and to the east and north are natural lowland drainages. The area's western boundary is based on the change to sedimentary soils from the volcanic soils of the Coast Range. The higher elevations of the coastal hills to the west, generally ranging from 1,000 to 2,000 feet (305–610 m), are much cooler and have proven unsuitable for grape growing. At the viticultural area's southwestern boundary, the area's almost purely sedimentary parent material changes to a mix of basalt, slate, and sedimentary material. The southern boundary transitions to a valley floor that contains deep soils composed of Willamette silts. The frost-prone nature of this lower elevation region, combined with its high soil permeability and fertility, makes it unsuitable for production of quality vinifera grape varieties.
Abbey and Kuehne Roads serve as the Yamhill-Carlton viticultural area's eastern border and mark the change from its sedimentary soils to the volcanic soils of the Dundee Hills. Millican Creek, a natural drainage between the viticultural area and the Dundee Hills, runs along this boundary line, flowing from north to south and eventually joining the Yamhill River near the town of Lafayette. Chehalem Creek's drainage system separates the Yamhill-Carlton from Ribbon Ridge and the Chehalem Mountains to the northeast. The Yamhill-Carlton's sedimentary soils are generally coarser in texture and subject to more faulting, uplifts, and erosion than the Ribbon Ridge sedimentary soil.
The Wapato Lakes Bed, a large, low drainage area on the northeastern boundary of the Yamhill-Carlton, separates it from the Chehalem Mountains. The soils of these two viticultural regions are vastly different. The Yamhill-Carlton has highly eroded sedimentary parent material, while the Chehalem Mountains, which lie across the Wapato Lake Bed, have soils formed from wind-blown mixed material and overlying basalt. The northern border of the Yamhill-Carlton viticultural area coincides with the low elevation Patton Valley with its predominately wind-blown soil. Within the Yamhill-Carlton viticultural area's boundary, which is described in the regulatory text below, only land from 200 to 1,000 feet (61–305 m) in elevation is included within the viticultural area. At elevations below 200 feet (61 m), the low valley floors are prone to frost. Conversely, at elevations greater than 1,000 feet (305 m), the higher terrain is significantly cooler and lacks the necessary heat to properly ripen wine grapes.

=== Climate ===
The climate of the Yamhill-Carlton viticultural area is distinct from the surrounding areas. It is bordered on the west by the mountains of the Coast Range, which have a colder climate as measured in degree-days (a heat summation obtained by totaling each day's temperature above 50 °F (10 °C) during the growing season), and which are unsuitable for production of vinifera wine grape varietals. Also, temperatures in the Yamhill-Carlton annually average 18.3 days above 90° F, while the Coast Range has only 2 such days, making it a significantly cooler growing area. The Coast Range is also wetter than the Yamhill-Carlton viticultural area. According to data obtained from the Oregon Climate Service, average rainfall for the Yamhill-Carlton is 42 inches (1,067 mm), while the Coast Range receives between 80 and 110 inches (2,032 and 2,794 mm) per year. The regions immediately south of the Yamhill-Carlton area are influenced by the cooling effect of weather systems flowing inland from the Pacific Ocean through the Van Duzer Corridor, a mountain gap in the Coast Range, at Dallas, Oregon. This corridor funnels cooling marine summer breezes east toward Salem, which substantially lowers the average temperature during the growing season. This marine cooling effect quickly dissipates as it moves north towards the Yamhill-Carlton AVA.
The Yamhill-Carlton has a 42-inch (1,067 mm) average annual rainfall, as compared to 49.1-inch (1,247 mm) for Dallas, Oregon, to the south at the Van Duzer Corridor. Also, Dallas has 51 fewer degree-days than McMinnville, which is at the southern border of the Yamhill-Carlton, and 186 fewer degree-days than Forest Grove, Oregon which lies six miles (10 km)miles north of the viticultural area.
The Patton Valley, a large, low area just north of the Yamhill-Carlton, has an annual rainfall average difference of about two inches (51 mm) when compared with the Yamhill-Carlton viticultural area. However, the 30-year average temperature data show the area north of Patton Valley to have 135 more degree-days than the Yamhill-Carlton. The USDA plant hardiness zones are 8b and 9a.

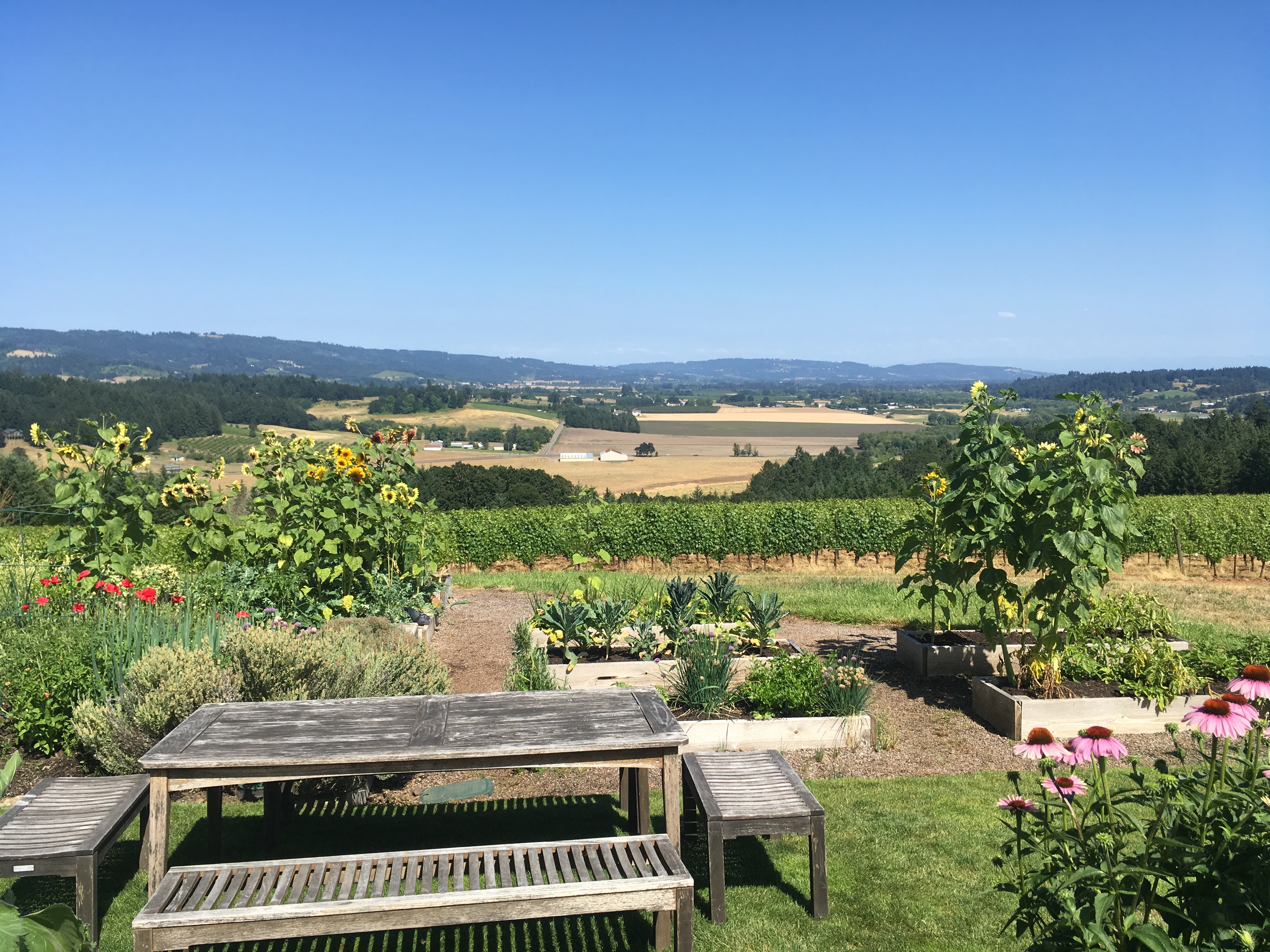
Penner Ash Winery

=== Soils ===
The most significant feature separating the Yamhill-Carlton viticultural area from nearby grape-growing regions is the area's predominant ancient sedimentary soils. Wines made from grapes grown in these sedimentary soils often contain distinct aromatic flavors (coffee, cocoa, anis, cedar, tobacco) not found in the same wine varietals grown in different soils, according to the petition. Also, the wines made from grapes grown in these ancient sedimentary soils are consistently lower in acid than wines made from grapes grown in basaltic or wind-blown soils.
According to The Roadside Geology of Oregon, by David Alt and Donald W. Hyndman, the soils of the Yamhill-Carlton, formed in the Eocene era, are derived from marine sediments and ocean floor volcanic basalt that have a high water-holding capacity with moderate to high erosion levels. Alan Campbell of NW Vineyards prepared a vineyard soils map of Yamhill County, Oregon, which shows that the western hills of the Yamhill-Carlton comprise two soil groups, Willakenzie on the lower elevation slopes and Peavine on the upper slopes. Peavine soils dominate the northern section of the viticultural area, while its eastern slopes comprise Wellsdale and Willakenzie soil series. The sedimentary soils of the Yamhill-Carlton viticultural area are millions of years older than the soils in the surrounding areas. In contrast, younger volcanic-based soils formed in the Miocene Era dominate in the Eola Hills, (south of the Yamhill-Carlton), Chehalem Mountains (north and east of the Yamhill-Carlton), and Dundee Hills (southeast of the Yamhill-Carlton). The Eola Hills have predominately basalt soil series (Neika, Gelderman, Ritner), which are characterized by their low water capacity, slow permeability, and moderate erosion level. The Chehalem Mountains have a combination of Columbia River basalt, ocean sedimentation, and wind-blown loess derivation soil types. The Dundee Hills contain soils mainly derived from Columbia River basalt lavas (largely based on the Jory series), which are moderately fertile and well drained, with slight to moderate erosion levels. The Ribbon Ridge region, immediately east of the Yamhill-Carlton viticultural area, also contains primarily sedimentary soils. However, these were formed in the Oligocene Era and are younger, finer, and more uniform than the sedimentary soils of the Yamhill-Carlton. The floor of the Willamette Valley, at elevations of 200 feet (61 m) or below, contains fine-grained soils deposited as a result of the Missoula floods, which occurred 12,000 years ago. These Willamette silt soils have greater depth, fertility, and water-holding capacity than soils of the viticultural area. The fertility and water-holding capacity of these low-elevation soils extends the vegetative period of the vine and delays the ripening of vines planted in the Willamette valley.
