= Van Duzer Corridor AVA =

American Viticultural Area of Oregon

Coordinates: 44°59′08″N 123°16′43″W

Van Duzer Corridor
- Wine region
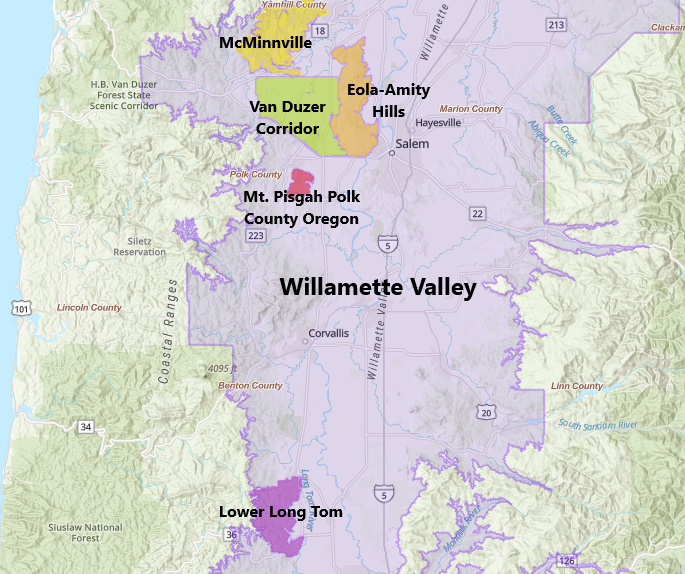
- Southern AVAs
- Type: American Viticultural Area
- Year established: 2018
- Years of wine industry: 15
- Country: United States
- Part of: Oregon, Willamette Valley AVA
- Other regions in Oregon, Willamette Valley AVA: Chehalem Mountains AVA, Dundee Hills AVA, Eola-Amity Hills AVA, Laurelwood District AVA, Lower Long Tom AVA, McMinnville AVA, Mount Pisgah, Polk County, Oregon AVA, Ribbon Ridge AVA, Tualatin Hills AVA, Yamhill-Carlton District AVA
- Climate region: Region I
- Heat units: 2,400 GDD
- Precipitation (annual average): 46 inches (1,168 mm)
- Soil conditions: Marine sediment with basalt over siltstone bedrock
- Total area: 59,871 acres (94 sq mi)
- Size of planted vineyards: 1,000 acres (405 ha)
- No. of vineyards: 18]
- Grapes produced: Chardonnay, Pinot Blanc, Pinot Gris, Pinot Noir, Riesling, Sauvignon Blanc, Viognier, Zweigelt)
- No. of wineries: 6

Van Duzer Corridor is an American Viticultural Area (AVA) located in portions of Yamhill and Polk Counties, Oregon about 20 miles (32 km) northwest of Salem within the northern half of the Willamette Valley landform bisected by the 45th parallel north. It was established as the nation's 244^{th}, the state's nineteenth and the valley's eighth appellation on December 14, 2018 by the Alcohol and Tobacco Tax and Trade Bureau (TTB), Treasury after reviewing a petition submitted by Mr. Jeff Havlin, the owner of Havlin Vineyard and chair of the Van Duzer Corridor AVA Committee, on behalf of himself and other local grape growers and vintners proposing the viticultural area named "Van Duzer Corridor."
The appellation was the seventh to designated entirely within the established Willamette Valley AVA and covers approximately 59,871 acres (94 sq mi). At the outset, there were 17 commercially-producing vineyards cultivating approximately 1,000 acres (405 ha) sourcing six resident wineries. As of 2025, there are now 18 vineyards within the AVA.

== Terroir ==
=== Topography ===
The distinguishing features of the Van Duzer Corridor AVA are its topography, climate, and soils. Topography is characterized by low elevations and gently rolling hills. The low elevations allow cool breezes to flow relatively unimpeded from the Pacific Ocean, through the Oregon Coast Range, forming a wind corridor gap known as the Van Duzer corridor. The western end of the Van Duzer Corridor wind gap is narrow and squeezed by high elevations to the north and south, leaving little room for viticulture. However, the eastern end of the Van Duzer Corridor wind gap, where the Van Duzer Corridor AVA is located, features the same low elevations and rolling hills as the western portion, with the distinction of having a wider area suitable for vineyards. Within the Van Duzer Corridor AVA, the elevation does not impede the eastward-flowing marine air, allowing higher wind speeds to flow through. In contrast, the surrounding regions all have higher elevations.

=== Climate ===
Climate is characterized by consistent high wind speeds and low cumulative growing degree-day (GDD) accumulations. The consistently high winds in the AVA contribute to thicker grape skins, and raise the levels of phenolic compounds in the fruit. In contrast, the wind speeds to the north and south southeast of the AVA are slower. The Van Duzer Corridor has lower GDD accumulations than surrounding regions to the north and southeast, indicating that its temperatures are generally cooler. The cooler temperatures ripen the fruit slowly, creating a longer hang time than for the same grape varietal grown in a region with higher GDD accumulations. The longer hang time contributes to a reduced acidity level. The USDA plant hardiness zone is 8b.

=== Soils ===
Soils are primarily uplifted marine sedimentary loams and silts with alluvial overlay, as well as some uplifted basalt. The soils are typically shallow, well-drained, and have a bedrock of siltstone. The high silt and clay levels in the soils balance the overall pH level of the soil by buffering against a sudden increase or decrease in soil pH. The buffering effect is beneficial to vineyards because it boosts the ability of the soils to maintain a stable pH level. In contrast, the soils immediately outside the northern and western boundaries contain soils from different soil series. Farther north and west, the soils contain higher concentrations of basalt and other volcanic materials. In contrast, east of the Van Duzer Corridor AVA, within the Eola-Amity Hills AVA the soils contain larger amounts of volcanic material than the AVA. Additionally, south of the AVA, the soils contain large concentrations of Ice Age loess, which is not found in the Van Duzer Corridor AVA.

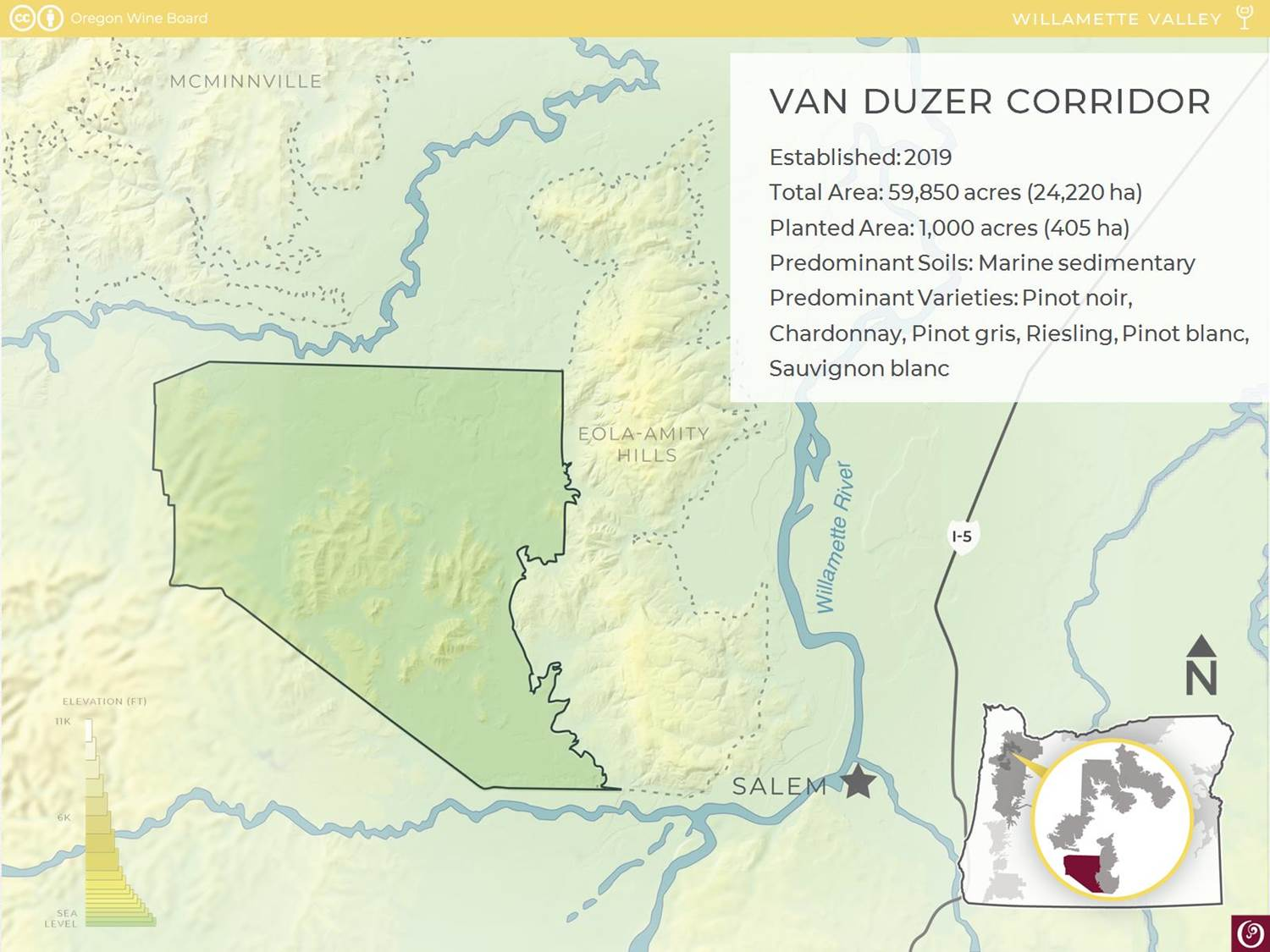
Map of the Van Duzer Corridor AVA courtesy of the Oregon Wine Board
