= Chehalem Mountains AVA =

American Viticultural Area in Oregon

Coordinates: 45°15′27″N 122°32′43″W

Chehalem Mountains
- Wine region
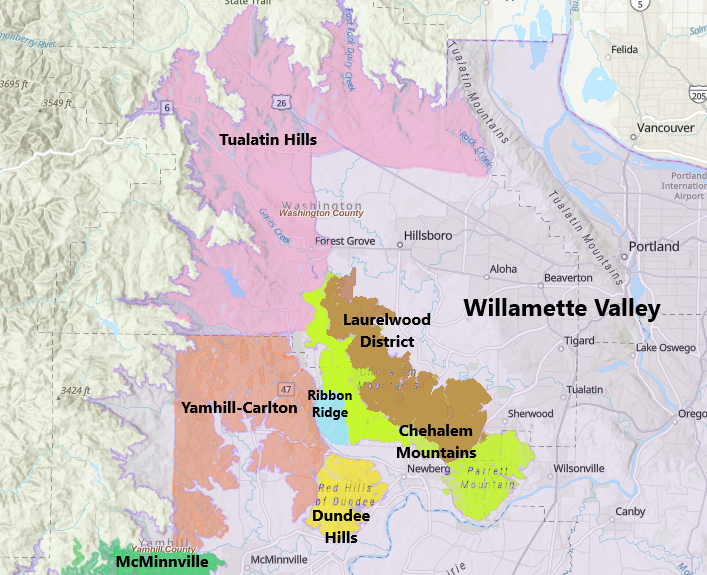
- Type: American Viticultural Area
- Year established: 2006
- Country: United States
- Part of: Oregon, Willamette Valley AVA
- Other regions in Oregon, Willamette Valley AVA: Dundee Hills AVA, Eola-Amity Hills AVA, Lower Long Tom AVA, McMinnville AVA, Mount Pisgah, Polk County, Oregon AVA, Tualatin Hills AVA, Van Duzer Corridor AVA, Yamhill-Carlton District AVA
- Sub-regions: Laurelwood District AVA, Ribbon Ridge AVA
- Growing season: 223 days
- Climate region: Region I
- Heat units: 1,800-2,200 GDD units
- Precipitation (annual average): 37 to 60 inches (940–1,524 mm)
- Soil conditions: loess, sedimentary, basaltic, and alluvial origins
- Total area: 68,265 acres (106.7 sq mi)
- Size of planted vineyards: 2,685 acres (1,087 ha)
- No. of vineyards: 36
- Grapes produced: Auxerrois, Chardonnay, Gamay Noir, Pinot Blanc, Pinot Gris, Pinot Noir, Riesling
- No. of wineries: 40
- Comments: Bald Peak, the highest in Chehalem Mountains, 1,636 ft (499 m) at the peak.

Chehalem Mountains is an American Viticultural Area (AVA) located in Washington, Yamhill and Clackamas Counties of northwestern Oregon entirely within the vast Willamette Valley landform approximately 19 miles (31 km) southwest of Portland and 45 miles (72 km) inland from the Pacific Ocean. It was established as the nation's 184^{th}, the state's fifteenth and the valley’s seventh wine appellation on November 27, 2006 by the Alcohol and Tobacco Tax and Trade Bureau (TTB), Treasury after reviewing the petition authored by David Adelsheim, Paul Hart, and Richard Ponzi, and submitted by Alex Sokol-Blosser, secretary of the North Willamette Valley AVA Group, proposing a viticultural area at the northern end of the valley named "Chehalem Mountains."
The viticultural area encompasses 68,265 acres (106.7 sq mi) and straddles the boundary between Yamhill and Washington Counties and extends well into Clackamas County. As of 2025 at least 36 vineyards, cultivating over 2,685 acres (1,087 ha), plus 40 commercial wineries exist within the boundaries of the viticultural area, with more added each year. Chehalem Mountains constitutes a single, continuous landmass measuring over twenty miles (32 km) in length and five miles (8 km) in width, uplifted above the Willamette Valley floor. The 200-foot (61 m) elevation line generally defines the perimeter of the area, which consists of a series of ridges and highpoints, including two highly delineated spurs, Ribbon Ridge and Parrett Mountain. The petitioners decided to use physical features and elevation as the primary factors in defining the boundaries of the area.
Since 2020, Chehalem Mountains contains two sub-appellations, Laurelwood District AVA and Ribbon Ridge AVA.

== History ==
The area is locally known as the Chehalem Mountains. They cite references that state the modern word "Chehalem" (/ˈtʃɛhələm/ chehay-luhm) comes from the Indian name Chahelim, which is listed under the heading Atfalati (Tualatin) in the Handbook of North American Indians. This name was given to the more than 20 bands of Indians living in the general vicinity of the Chehalem Mountains in the early 1800s. The indigenous Che-ahm-ill people of the "Yam Hills" area were a sub-group of the Kalapuyan culture. They occupied the valley at the time of Euro-American contact and for several decades afterward until their numbers dwindled and the few survivors were removed with other tribes to reservations, primarily the Grand Ronde Reservation in the Oregon Coast Range. By 1812, Pacific Fur Company traders entered the Willamette Valley under the leadership of Donald Mackenzie as the first documented contact between Kalapuyan and European settlers in the north Willamette Valley. The petitioners further state the word "Chehalem" appears to have entered the vocabulary of the early prior to 1840. Ewing Young, after leading pioneering fur brigades in California, came to Portland in 1834 and settled on the west bank of the Willamette River near the mouth of Chehalem Creek, opposite of Champoeg. Young's home is believed to be the first house built by European-Americans on that side of the river. A lumber mill was installed on Chehalem Creek in 1834, and in 1848 Joseph B. Rogers had the town of "Chehalem" platted on property he owned where Newberg, Oregon stands today. The town had one of the earliest post offices in Yamhill County, established March 14, 1851, but it closed within a year.

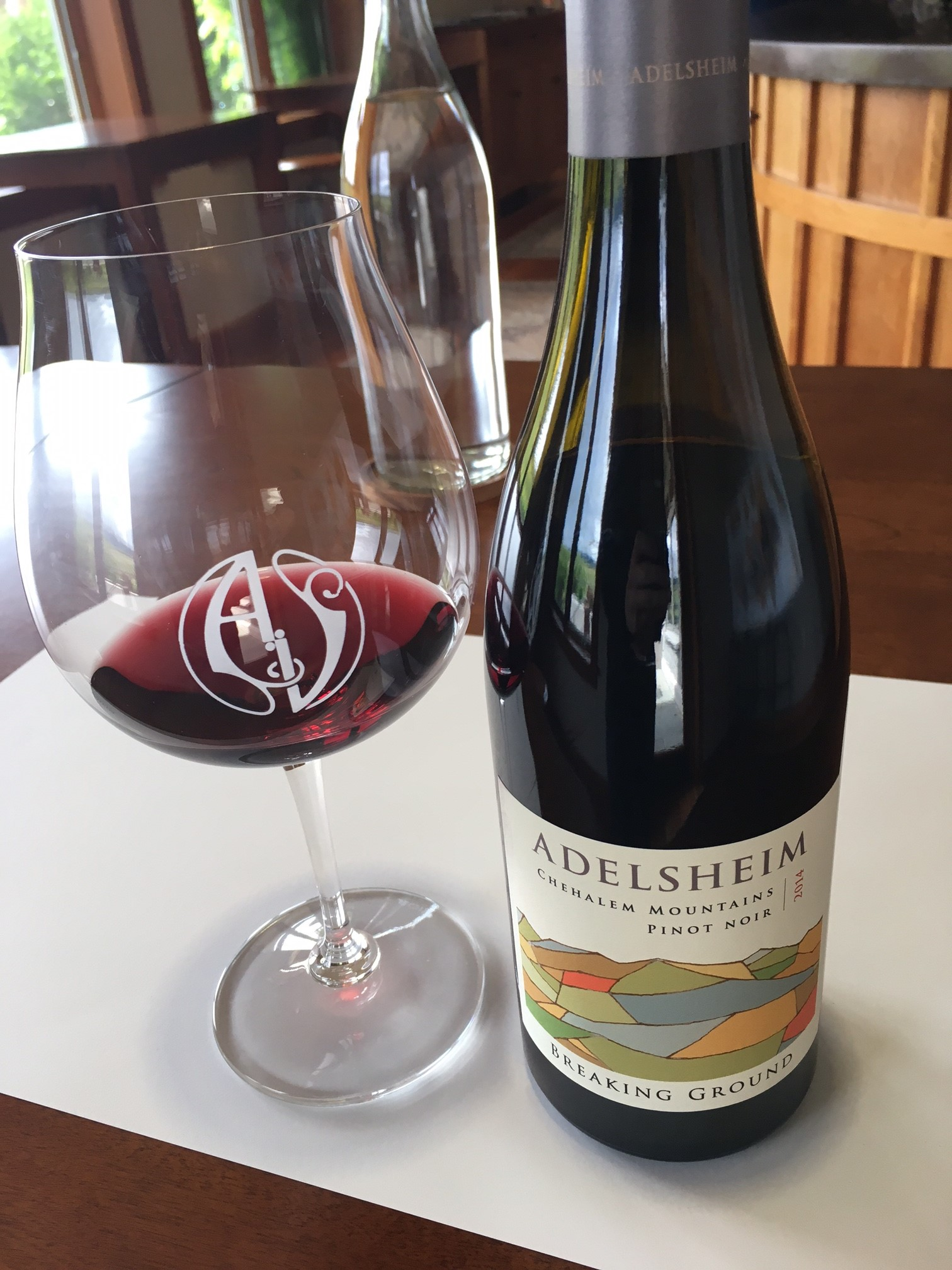
Adelsheim Vineyard's 2014 Pinot Noir of Chehalem Mountains

== Terroir ==
=== Topography ===
Chehalem Mountains AVA is associated with the Chehalem Mountains entirely within the Willamette Valley AVA boundaries. Its acreage extends 20 miles (32 km) from northwest of Wilsonville in the southeast to Forest Grove in the northwest featuring the elevations of Ribbon Ridge, Parrett Mountain and Bald Peak.
The length and towering peaks of the Chehalem Mountains landform distinguish the viticultural area from the surrounding Willamette Valley area. Viewable from the West Hills of Portland and the northern Willamette Valley floor, the Chehalem Mountains measure more than 20 miles in length and 5 miles in width. The mountains are a single continuous landmass of increasing elevation, containing a series of ridges and two highly delineated spurs, Ribbon Ridge and Parrett Mountain. The mountains also serve to separate the Tualatin River basin and the Chehalem Valley, the petition continues. The slopes of the Chehalem Mountains, both steep and gentle, significantly contrast with the almost flat Willamette Valley floor, the petition explains. On the west side of Ribbon Ridge and the southeast side of Parrett Mountain, the slopes descend steeply, according to the petition and the USGS maps of the region. At the bottom of these steep descents, the slopes become almost level and flatten into the valley floor.
The majority of the Chehalem Mountains slopes shift gradually and gently to the valley floor, as shown on USGS regional maps. Where the terrain transition lacks distinction, the petitioner uses a combination of terrain, elevation, slope, and soil criteria to determine the boundary line of the Chehalem Mountains viticultural area.
Within the Willamette Valley, the Chehalem Mountains tower in height over the surrounding landforms and terrain, according to the petition. Bald Peak, northwest of Newberg and within the Chehalem Mountains viticultural area, rises to 1,633 feet (498 m) above sea level, while the surrounding valley floor sits at or below 200 feet (61 m) in elevation, according to the USGS regional maps. Most of the vineyards in the Chehalem Mountains viticultural area, the petition states, lie between the 200 and 100 feet (61 and 30 m) contour lines. The areas below 200 feet (61 m) in elevation have alluvial soils, characterized by greater depth, fertility, and water-holding capacity, according to the petition. This combination of soil features extends the growing period of the Willamette Valley floor and delays grape ripening. Also, frost potential increases at the lower elevations of the valley floor when compared to the higher hillside and mountain elevations. As a result, the Chehalem Mountains viticultural area boundary line excludes valley floor elevations and its alluvial soils, the petition states.

=== Climate ===
Significant annual precipitation best distinguishes the climate of the Chehalem Mountains viticultural area from surrounding regions, the petition claims. As the highest mountains in the Willamette Valley the Chehalems create a large obstacle for west-to-east moving storms. When the moist air rises over the Chehalem Mountains, water vapor in the cooling air condenses and falls to earth as terrain-induced rain, the petition explains. According to data from the Atlas of Oregon, second edition (University of Oregon Press, 2001), annual rainfall within the boundaries of the viticultural area ranges from 37 inches (940 mm) in the lower elevations to almost 60 inches (1,524 mm) at the highest elevation at Bald Peak. This annual precipitation contrasts with the 36 inches (914 mm) received in Hillsboro and Beaverton to the north of the viticultural area, French Prairie to the south, and Portland International Airport to the east. To the west of the Chehalems, the Coast Range, closer to the moisture-laden air of the Pacific Ocean, annually averages over 100 inches (2,540 mm) of rain.
Several other uplifted regions within the Willamette Valley include higher rainfall levels than the surrounding valley floor, but none are as dramatic as the Chehalem Mountains. For example, to the south-southwest of the viticultural area, the Eola Hills, which peak at approximately 1,160 feet (354 m), receive 40 to 48 inches (1,016–1,219 mm) of annual precipitation, while to the south of the viticultural area, the Dundee Hills, which peak at 1,067 feet (325 m) in elevation, receive 40 to 44 inches (1,016–1,118 mm) of annual precipitation.
Temperatures vary within the Chehalem Mountains more than in any other region within the Willamette Valley, the petition explains. According to data from the Oregon Climate Service, heat accumulation during the Chehalem Mountains growing season varies from over 2,200 degree days along the mountains' south side base to less than 1,800 degree days on the northsides of their higher peaks. The annual 400 degree-day variation typically results in a three-week difference in the ripening of Pinot Noir grapes. Each degree that a day’s mean temperature is above 50 degrees Fahrenheit, which is the minimum temperature required for grapevine growth, is counted as one degree day as defined in General Viticulture, by Albert J. Winkler. Evapotranspiration, or the loss of water from soil and plants by a combination of evaporation and transpiration, averages about three inches (76 mm) less at the higher elevations of the Chehalem Mountains when compared to the surrounding valleys. This difference corresponds to the warmer growing temperatures found at the lower elevations, as compared to the cooler growing temperatures at the higher elevations of the Chehalem Mountains

=== Soils ===
The diverse Chehalem Mountains soils fail to qualify as a distinguishing feature for this viticultural area. The soils, according to the petition, include loess, sedimentary, basaltic, and alluvial origins. The Ribbon Ridge spur, within the Chehalem Mountains southwest boundary line and heavily planted to red wine grapes, includes sedimentary soil of the Willakenzie Series, the petition explains. The central and southern Chehalem Mountains, with vineyards of white grapes and extensive Pinot Noir plantings, include large deposits of basaltic soils, mainly of the Jory Series. The central Chehalem Mountains region also includes loess soils, primarily of the Laurelwood Series. The petition further states that the sedimentary western flank of the Chehalem Mountains contains similarities to the adjacent hilly region surrounding the Yamhill River Basin, beyond the boundary line. Also, the basaltic-origin soils of the Chehalem Mountains' southern slope and the Parrett Mountain spur resemble soils found further south and outside the boundary line in the Dundee Hills and on the east side of the Eola Hills. Eolian soils on the north side of the Chehalem Mountains, the petition continues, resemble those found on the hills further north and east, beyond the boundary line, in the Tualatin basin at Cooper and Bull Mountains. Finally, alluvial soils at the base of the Chehalem Mountains contain similarities to the surrounding valley flood plain soils found at elevations below the viticultural area boundary line. The petition concludes that terrain, elevation, and climatic features of the Chehalem Mountains viticultural area join to create the distinguishing features of this viticultural region. The Chehalem Mountains soils, with their variety of parent material types, lack distinction from the surrounding Willamette Valley floor and hill formations.
