= Tualatin Hills AVA =

American wine region located in Oregon

Coordinates: 45°32′51″N 123°09′27″W

Tualatin Hills
- Wine region
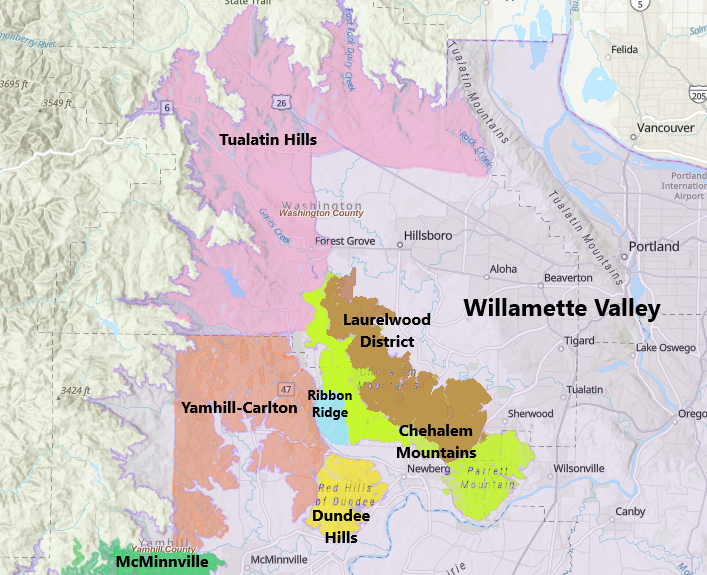
- Type: American Viticultural Area
- Year established: 2020
- Country: United States
- Part of: Oregon, Willamette Valley AVA
- Other regions in Oregon, Willamette Valley AVA: Chehalem Mountains AVA, Dundee Hills AVA, Eola-Amity Hills AVA, Laurelwood District AVA, Lower Long Tom AVA, McMinnville AVA, Mount Pisgah, Polk County, Oregon AVA, Ribbon Ridge AVA, Van Duzer Corridor AVA, Yamhill-Carlton District AVA
- Growing season: 174 days
- Climate region: Continental
- Precipitation (annual average): 43.67 inches (1,109 mm)
- Soil conditions: Weathered basalt and sedimentary loess with fine, silty soil
- Total area: 33,600 acres (53 sq mi).
- Size of planted vineyards: 975 acres (395 ha)
- No. of vineyards: 41
- Grapes produced: Chardonnay, Pinot Noir
- No. of wineries: 10

Tualatin Hills (/tuːˈɑːlətɪn/ Too-ah-lə-tin) is an American Viticultural Area (AVA) due west of Portland and just east from the Oregon Coast Range within portions of Multnomah and Washington Counties located entirely within the northernmost Willamette Valley landform in and around the towns of Gaston, Forest Grove, Sherwood and Cornelius. It was established as the nation's 247^{th}, the state's 20^{th} and the valley's tenth wine appellation on June 3, 2020 by the Alcohol and Tobacco Tax and Trade Bureau (TTB), Treasury after reviewing the petition submitted by Rudolf Marchesi, president of Montinore Estate, Alfredo Apolloni, owner and winemaker of Apolloni Vineyards, and Mike Kuenz, general manager of David Hill Vineyard and Winery, on behalf of themselves and other local grape growers and vintners, proposing the viticultural area named "Tualatin Hills."
The area lies in the upland hills of the Tualatin River watershed and encompasses elevations between 200 and 1,000 feet (61–305 m). To the south and southeast are the Chehalem Mountains with elevations of over 1,000 feet (305 m) and considered to be a separate, distinct landform from the uplands within the Tualatin Hills. The region extends over approximately 144,000 acres (225 sq mi) and, at the outset, contained 21 wineries with 33 commercially-producing vineyards cultivating approximately 860.5 acres (348 ha). The distinguishing features of Tualatin Hills are its soils, elevation, and climate.

== Terroir ==
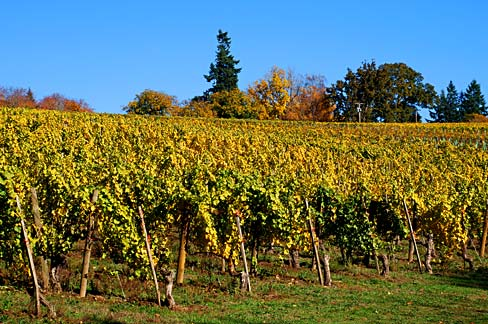
Tualatin Estates Vineyards

The Willamette Valley is full of microclimates, varying aspects and more that have a profound impact on the wines grown there. Tualatin Hills is partially adjacent at its southern end to Laurelwood District AVA which was established with Tualatin Hills. The two AVAs are both noted for the Laurelwood soils consisting of exceptionally fine loess deposited over ancient basalt. The silt-sized sediment was formed by the accumulation of wind-blown dust produced by the grinding down of basaltic and other volcanic rocks by glaciers during the last Ice Age. However, Tualatin Hills also contains Kinton and Cornelius soils mixed with the Laurelwood soil while its adjacent AVA is primarily a concentration of its namesake soil. The USDA plant hardiness zones are 8a and 8b.

== Wine Industry ==
The area lies in the heart of Oregon's Pinot Noir producing zone. It is home to some of the oldest vineyards in Oregon, including David Hill, Ponzi and Cooper Mountain. The AVA petition filed at the TTB in 2015 was led by Alfredo Apolloni of Apolloni Vineyards, Rudy Marchesi of Montinore Estate and Mike Kuenz of David Hill Vineyard and Winery.
