= Willamette Valley AVA =

Wine region in Oregon, United States

Willamette Valley
- Wine region
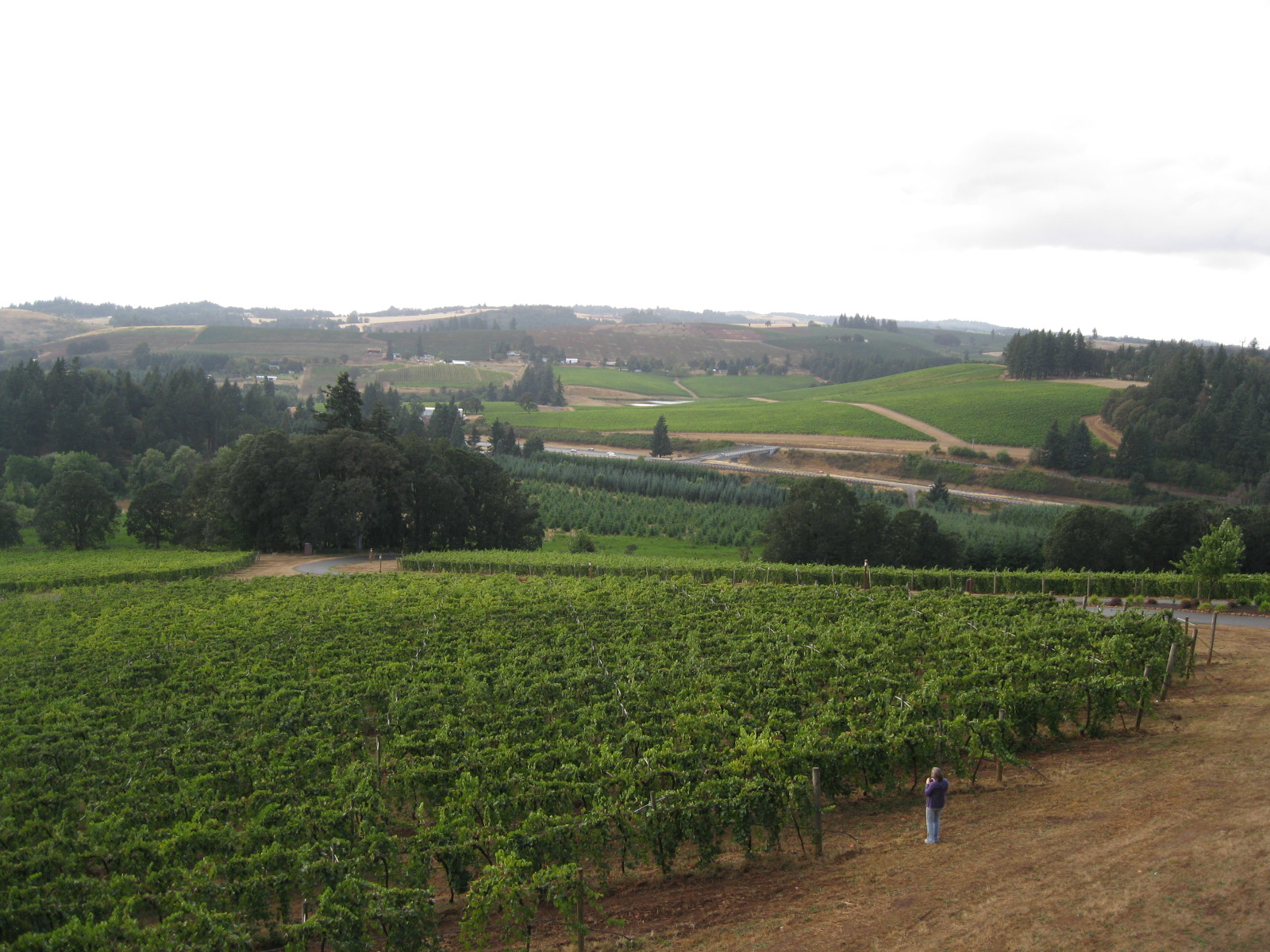
- Willamette Valley
- Type: American Viticultural Area
- Year established: 1983; 2016 Amend:
- Years of wine industry: 146
- Country: United States
- Part of: Oregon
- Sub-regions: Chehalem Mountains AVA, Dundee Hills AVA, Eola-Amity Hills AVA, Laurelwood District AVA, Lower Long Tom AVA, McMinnville AVA, Mount Pisgah, Polk County, Oregon AVA, Ribbon Ridge AVA, Tualatin Hills AVA, Van Duzer Corridor AVA, Yamhill-Carlton District AVA
- Climate region: Maritime
- Soil conditions: Volcanic origin and weathered sedimentary loam
- Total area: 3.3 million acres (5,200 sq mi); 2016: 3.4 million acres (5,360 sq mi)
- Size of planted vineyards: 27,202 acres (11,008 ha)
- No. of vineyards: 931
- Grapes produced: Auxerrois, Cabernet Franc, Cabernet Sauvignon, Cascade, Chardonnay, Dolcetto, Gamay noir, Gewurztraminer, Malbec, Marechal Foch, Melon, Merlot, Müller-Thurgau, Muscat Canelli, Muscat Ottonel, Pinot blanc, Pinot gris, Pinot noir, Riesling, Sauvignon blanc, Syrah, Tocai Friulano, Viognier
- No. of wineries: 736

Willamette Valley (/wɪˈlæmɪt/ wil-LAM-et) is an American Viticultural Area (AVA) located in the vast Willamette Valley landform of Oregon. The appellation is the wine growing region which encompasses the drainage basin of the Willamette River. It stretches on a north-south axis from the Columbia River to just south of Eugene where the Willamette Valley ends; and from the Oregon Coast Range due east to the Cascade Mountains. This region grew to fame after Eyrie Vineyard, the first vineyard in Willamette, received international recognition at the Wine Olympics of 1979. This competition featured 330 different wines. The 1975 Eyrie Pinot Noir Reserve attracted attention by placing 10th among Pinots bringing attention to the previously unknown region. With 4 years later being established as the nation's 55^{th} and Oregon’s initial wine appellation on December 1, 1983 by the Bureau of Alcohol, Tobacco and Firearms (ATF), Treasury, after reviewing the petition submitted by Mr. David B. Adelsheim, chairman, Appellation Committee, Oregon Winegrowers Association, and owner of Adelsheim Vineyard, proposing a viticultural area in northwest Oregon, as part of the Willamette River Basin, to be known as "Willamette Valley."

The 3.43-million-acre (5,360 sq mi) Willamette Valley is the largest AVA in the state, and contains most of the state's wineries, approximately 736, and vineyards, about 900, cultivating about 27,202 acres (11,008 ha) under vine, as of 2025.. Since its designation in 1983, eleven distinctly featured appellations, referred as "sub-AVA" or "sub-appellation", were established within the valley landform, with nine of them in the northern region and the Lower Long Tom AVA in the southern. The Willamette Valley has a cool, moist climate, and is recognized worldwide for its Pinot noir.

Although not officially defined, many wine connoisseurs segment the Willamette Valley into northern and southern regions with the demarcation at the latitude of Salem (approximately 45° north).

== Climate ==
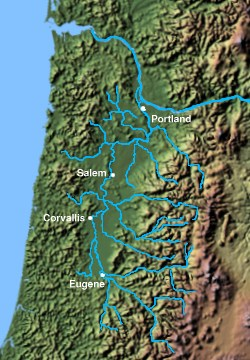
The Willamette River Valley

The climate of Willamette Valley is mild year-round. Winters are typically cool and wet, summers are dry and warm; heat above 90 °F (32 °C) only occurs 5 to 15 days per year, and the temperature drops below 0 °F (−18 °C) once every 25 years. Most rainfall occurs in the late autumn, winter, and early spring, when temperatures are the coldest. The valley gets relatively little snow (5 inches (13 cm) to 10 inches (25 cm)) per year. The USDA plant hardiness zones range from 8a to 9a.

Not all portions of the Willamette Valley are suitable for vineyards, however, the greatest concentration of wineries is found west of the Willamette River, on the leeward slopes of the Coast Range, or among the numerous river and stream valleys created by Willamette River tributaries. By far, most of wineries are in Yamhill County.

== Management Strategies ==
=== Dry Farming ===
Most viticulturalists in the region do not irrigate. This is to help support deep-rooted vines that are less susceptible to periods of drought and to enhance the quality of the wine through better expression of soil composition and micronutrients while supporting rapid ripening from some level of water stress.

=== Preventing Frost Damage ===
Pruning in this AVA is done later in winter, to remove frost-damaged wood. Another way of preventing damage is using cane burial techniques where the rootstock is buried under 4 inches of soil.

=== Site Selection ===
Most vineyards sit on southeast-facing slopes where maximizing sun exposure and air movement when establishing rows is critical. The region is generally known for its marine sedimentary, volcanic, and loess soils.

== Sub-Appellations ==
There are eleven American Viticultural Areas within the Willamette Valley. These sub-AVAs define regions within the valley that contain distinctive climate, soil, elevation and other physical features that make them noteworthy for wine production. (By establishment date)

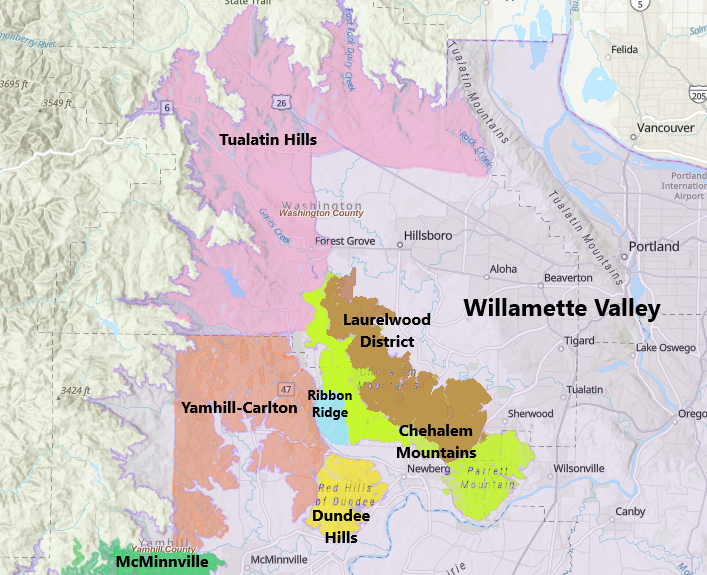
Northern AVAs

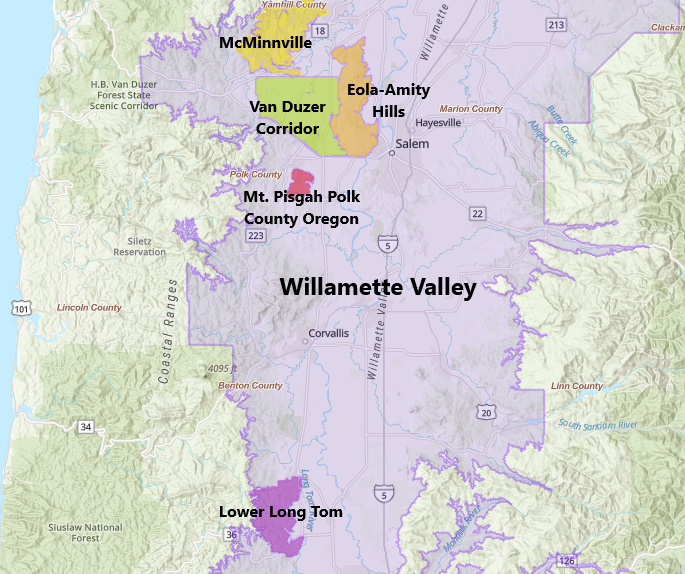
Southern AVAs

=== Dundee Hills ===
Dundee Hills is the valley's second AVA and the initial sub-appellation established in November 2004. It is located in the hills northwest of Dundee encompassing about 6,940 acres (11 sq mi) cultivating 1,300 acres (526 ha) of grapes. Over 25 wineries and independent vineyards in this region produce over 44,000 cases of wine. The area is particularly noted for its Pinot noir; several wineries in the AVA have won international recognition for their wines.

=== Yamhill-Carlton District ===
Yamhil-Carlton District is located in the area surrounding the towns of Yamhill and Carlton. Only grapes grown in vineyards with elevations ranging from 200 feet (100 m) to 1,000 feet (300 m) may be used to produce wines that bear the appellation name on their labels. The AVA includes over 2,844 acres (1,151 ha) of vineyard, as of 2025, and is in the rain shadow of the 3,500 feet (1,100 m) Oregon Coast Range, a short distance to the west. The AVA was established in 2004.

=== McMinnville ===
McMinnville was established in 2005 and is located in the hills to the southwest of McMinnville expanding toward Sheridan. The AVA includes 14 wineries and 523 acres (211.7 ha) of vineyards and includes only acreage in elevations ranging from 200 to 1,000 feet (100–300 m).

=== Ribbon Ridge ===
Ribbon Ridge, located between Newberg and Gaston, is a ridge containing uplift of ocean sediment. It lies at 45°21′N 123°04′W at the northwest end of the Chehalem Mountains. The name originates in the 19th century. Oregon's smallest AVA is approximately 3.5-mile long (6 km) and 1.7-mile wide (3 km) on a north–south axis covering 3,350 acres (5 sq mi) with 620 acres (251 ha) under vine on 36 vineyards. It is estimated that between 1,000 to 1,400 acres (405–567 ha) are suitable for cultivating premium wine grapes.

=== Eola-Amity Hills ===
Eola-Amity Hills stretches from the town of Amity in the north to Salem in the south within Polk and Yamhill Counties. The hills cover an area west of the Willamette River approximately 15 miles (24 km) long by 6 miles (10 km) wide. The Eola-Amity Hills area benefits from steady winds off the Pacific Ocean that reach the Willamette Valley through the Van Duzer corridor, a gap in the Oregon Coast Range, moderating the summer temperatures. The name Eola is a tribute to the windy conditions in the area, and is derived from Aeolus, the Greek god of wind.

=== Chehalem Mountains ===
Chehalem Mountains, established in 2006, stretches 20 miles (32 km) from Wilsonville in the southeast to Forest Grove in the northwest. The Chehalem Mountains includes Ribbon Ridge, Parrett Mountain, and Bald Peak. The petition process for the creation of the AVA began in 2001 and was led by David Adelsheim of Adelsheim Vineyard. It contains two sub-regions, Laurelwood District AVA and Ribbon Ridge AVA.

=== Van Duzer Corridor ===
Van Duzer Corridor is located in Polk County just west of Eola-Amity Hills AVA encompassing approximately 59,871 acres (94 sq mi). The AVA is known for its low elevations, gently rolling hills, cool breezes from the Pacific Ocean and soils which are primarily uplifted marine sedimentary loams and silts with alluvial overlay. The AVA was established in 2018.

=== Laurelwood District ===
Laurelwood District is located west of the city of Portland and lies entirely within the Willamette Valley and Chehalem Mountains AVAs since it was established in May 2020. It covers approximately 33,600 acres (13,597 ha) and contains 25 wineries and approximately 70 commercially-producing vineyards that cover a total of approximately 975 acres (395 ha). The distinguishing feature of the Laurelwood District is the predominance of the Laurelwood soil series.

=== Tualatin Hills ===
Tualatin Hills was established the same day as Laurelwood District and located in the upland hills of the Tualatin River watershed encompassing elevations between 200 and 1,000 feet (61 and 305 m). To the south and southeast are the Chehalem Mountains, which includes elevations of over 1,000 feet (305 m), are considered to be a separate, distinct landform from the Tualatin Hills. The AVA is approximately 144,000 acres (225 sq mi) with 33 commercially-producing vineyards cultivating approximately 860.5 acres (348 ha) sourcing 21 wineries.

=== Lower Long Tom ===
Lower Long Tom was established in 2021. It is located in the southern Willamette Valley in Lane and Benton Counties, near the towns of Junction City and Monroe. Its coverage is approximately 25,000 acres (39 sq mi) and contains 12 wineries and 24 commercially-producing vineyards that plant approximately 575 acres (233 ha). As of 2022, the Lower Long Tom is the only nested appellation located in the southern Willamette Valley AVA, in contrast to nine nested appellations in the north. The region is primarily known for its Pinot noir and Pinot gris.

=== Mount Pisgah, Polk County, Oregon ===
Mount Pisgah, Polk County, Oregon viticultural area surrounds the city and county seat of Dallas in Polk County. It was established on June 3, 2022 by the TTB as the state's 23^{rd} and eleventh sub-appellation in the Willamette Valley AVA. It encompasses approximately 5,850 acres (9 sq mi) and contains 10 commercial vineyards cultivating about 648 acres (262 ha) under vine sourcing two wineries. The viticultural area surrounds Mount Pisgah which was formed 65 million years ago as a sea floor volcano, covered by marine sediment and pushed up out of the ocean, among the hills of the Willamette Valley rising 260 to 835 feet (79–255 m) from the foothills to its peak. The landform was so named in 1844 by an early settler after a similar wooded and grass covered butte near his childhood Missouri home and his veneration for biblical names. Mount Pisgah (Hebrew: פִּסְגָּה, 'pɪz.ɡə PIZ-gah), is a mountain of Abarim, Moab, northeast of the Dead Sea usually referring to Mount Nebo. The word פִּסְגָּה literally means "summit." The long AVA name was assigned to avoid confusion with another "Mount Pisgah" in a different county or state.
