= Auxerrois =

Auxerrois is a historical province of France. Named after the city of Auxerre in Burgundy, it gives its name to several grape varieties:

- Auxerrois Blanc, a white wine grape that is widely grown in Alsace, and also in Lorraine, Germany and Luxembourg
- Malbec (or Côt), a red wine grape grown in the Cahors region of France, where it is known as Auxerrois
- Pinot gris, sometimes called Auxerrois Gris in France
- Valdiguié, known as Gros Auxerrois in the South of France
