= Amity Hills =

Eola Hills
- Location within Oregon Location within the United States

Highest point
- Elevation: 241 m (791 ft)

Geography
- Country: United States
- State: Oregon
- District: Yamhill County
- Range coordinates: 45°7′52″N 123°9′49″W
- Topo map: USGS McMinnville

The Amity Hills are a range of hills northeast of Amity, in Yamhill County, Oregon, United States. A northern spur or extension of the Eola Hills, they are separated from them by a pass between Amity and Hopewell. They stretch about four miles from Amity towards Dayton Prairie. With the Eola Hills they make up the Eola-Amity Hills AVA wine region. They are sometimes called the Yamhill Mountains.
