= Red Hills of Dundee =

Mountain range in Oregon, United States

- Location within Oregon

Highest point
- Elevation: 249 m (817 ft)

Geography
- Country: United States
- State: Oregon
- District: Yamhill County
- Range coordinates: 45°17′8.421″N 123°3′7.370″W
- Topo map: USGS Dundee

The Red Hills of Dundee is a mountain range in Yamhill County, Oregon.
