= Laurelwood District AVA =

American wine region located in Oregon

Coordinates: 45°22′48″N 122°56′09″W

Laurelwood District
- Wine region
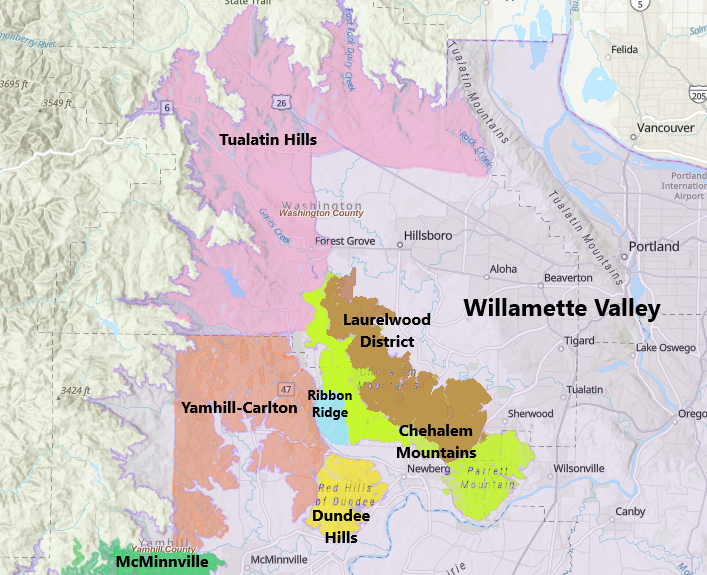
- Type: American Viticultural Area
- Year established: 2020
- Country: United States
- Part of: Oregon, Willamette Valley AVA, Chehalem Mountains AVA
- Other regions in Oregon, Willamette Valley AVA, Chehalem Mountains AVA: Ribbon Ridge AVA
- Soil conditions: Fine glacial loess
- Total area: 33,600 acres (53 sq mi).
- Size of planted vineyards: 975 acres (395 ha)
- No. of vineyards: 70
- Varietals produced: Chardonnay, Pinot Noir
- No. of wineries: 25

Laurelwood District is an American Viticultural Area (AVA) located within the northern end of Willamette Valley landform west of the city of Portland and lies entirely in the Willamette Valley AVA and the smaller nested Chehalem Mountains AVA. The Chehalem Mountains are a main defining feature along with the area's unique soil profile, and the area includes portions of the towns of Cornelius, Scholls and Sherwood in Washington County. It was established as the nation's 248th, the state's 21st and the valley's ninth wine appellation on June 3, 2020, by the Alcohol and Tobacco Tax and Trade Bureau (TTB), Treasury after reviewing the petition submitted by Luisa Ponzi, then-winemaker of Ponzi Vineyards, Maria Ponzi, then-president of Ponzi Vineyards, and Kevin Johnson, winemaker of Dion Vineyards, on behalf of themselves and other local grape growers and vintners, proposing the viticultural area to be known as "Laurelwood."

At the request of TTB, the petitioners agreed to add the word "District" to the proposed name, in order to avoid a potential impact on current label holders who are using "Laurelwood" as a brand name or fanciful name on their wine labels. Its acreage is approximately 33,600 acres (53 sq mi) with, at the outset, is resident to 25 wineries and approximately 70 commercially-producing vineyards cultivating approximately 975 acres (395 ha).
The Laurelwood District's main distinguishing feature is the predominance of Laurelwood soil, a windblown loess over fractured Jory basalt. The district contains the highest concentration of the namesake soil in Oregon. Other defining features of the AVA are its location among the Chehalem Mountains - granting it the highest planted sites in the Willamette Valley, and its proximity to warm wind influence from the Columbia River Gorge.

== Terroir ==
The northern boundary is adjacent to Tualatin Hills AVA established on the same date and also partially noted for the Laurelwood soil consisting of exceptionally fine wind-blown loess deposited over ancient basalt. Silt-sized sediment was formed by the accumulation of wind-blown dust and produced by the grinding down of basaltic and other volcanic rocks by glaciers during the last Ice Age. The soil sits atop a fractured basalt subsoil that provides quick drainage and produces deeply rooted vines and wines that show distinctive spice and elegance. The USDA plant hardiness zones are 8b and 9a.

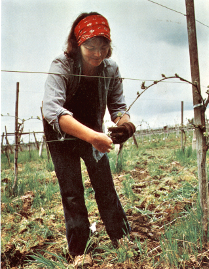
Nancy Ponzi, of Ponzi Vineyards, a pioneer in the Oregon wine industry.

== Wine Industry ==
The district lies in the heart of Oregon's Pinot Noir producing zone. Some of the wineries found within its boundaries are Ponzi Vineyards, Alloro Vineyards, Raptor Ridge and Rex Hill.
