= Ribbon Ridge AVA =

American Viticultural Area of Oregon

Ribbon Ridge
- Wine region
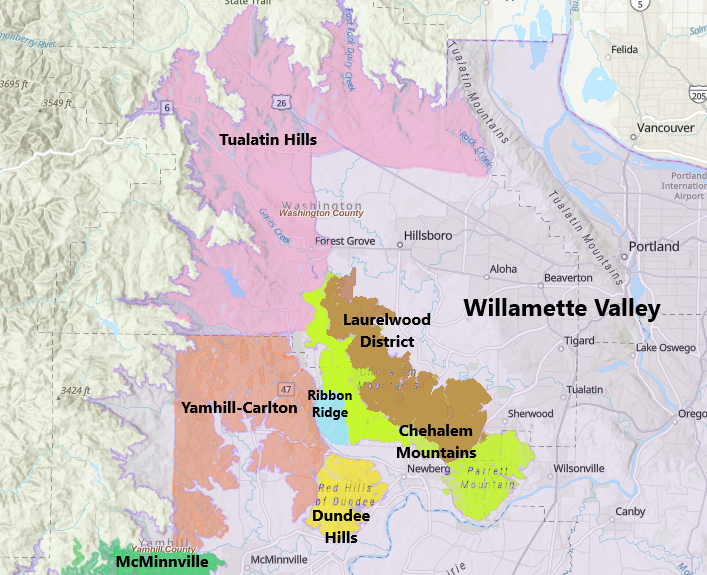
- Northern AVAs
- Type: American Viticultural Area
- Year established: 2005
- Years of wine industry: 46
- Country: United States
- Part of: Oregon, Willamette Valley AVA, Chehalem Mountains AVA
- Other regions in Oregon, Willamette Valley AVA, Chehalem Mountains AVA: Laurelwood District AVA
- Growing season: 233 days
- Climate region: Region Ib
- Heat units: 2,487 GDD units
- Precipitation (annual average): 10 inches (254 mm)
- Soil conditions: Marine sediment (mainly Willakenzie series)
- Total area: 3,350 acres (5 sq mi)
- Size of planted vineyards: 620 acres (251 ha)
- No. of vineyards: 36
- Grapes produced: Auxerrois Blanc, Chardonnay, Muscat Canelli, Pinot gris, Pinot noir, Gamay Noir

Ribbon Ridge is an American Viticultural Area (AVA) located in Yamhill County, Oregon within the vast Willamette Valley landform about 22 miles (35 km) southwest of Portland and 40 miles (64 km) inland of the Pacific Ocean. It was established as the nation's 161^{st}, the state's twelfth and the valley's fifth appellation on June 1, 2005 by the Alcohol and Tobacco Tax and Trade Bureau (TTB), Treasury after reviewing the petition submitted by Alex Sokol-Blosser, secretary of the North Willamette Valley AVA Group, on behalf of local wineries and growers proposing the viticultural area named "Ribbon Ridge."

Oregon's smallest AVA is entirely contained within the Chehalem Mountains AVA and both are sub-appellations within the Willamette Valley AVA. The 3,350-acre (5 sq mi) Ribbon Ridge lies midway between the towns of Newberg and Gaston, at the northwest end of the Chehalem Mountains cultivaing about 620 acres (251 ha) under vine on 36 vineyards sourcing a dozen wineries. It is estimated that between 1,000 and 1,400 acres (405–567 ha) are suitable for cultivating premium wine grapes. The appellation is known for its exceptional Pinot Noir wine, with 90% of its vineyards planted with that varietal.

The appellation is known for its exceptional Pinot noir wine, and 90% of its vineyards are planted with that grape variety. As Wine Enthusiast commented, "the area creates aromatic Pinots with exceptional structure, balance and dark red and black fruits, driven by bright acidity, often with an underpinning of salty seashell minerality."

== History ==
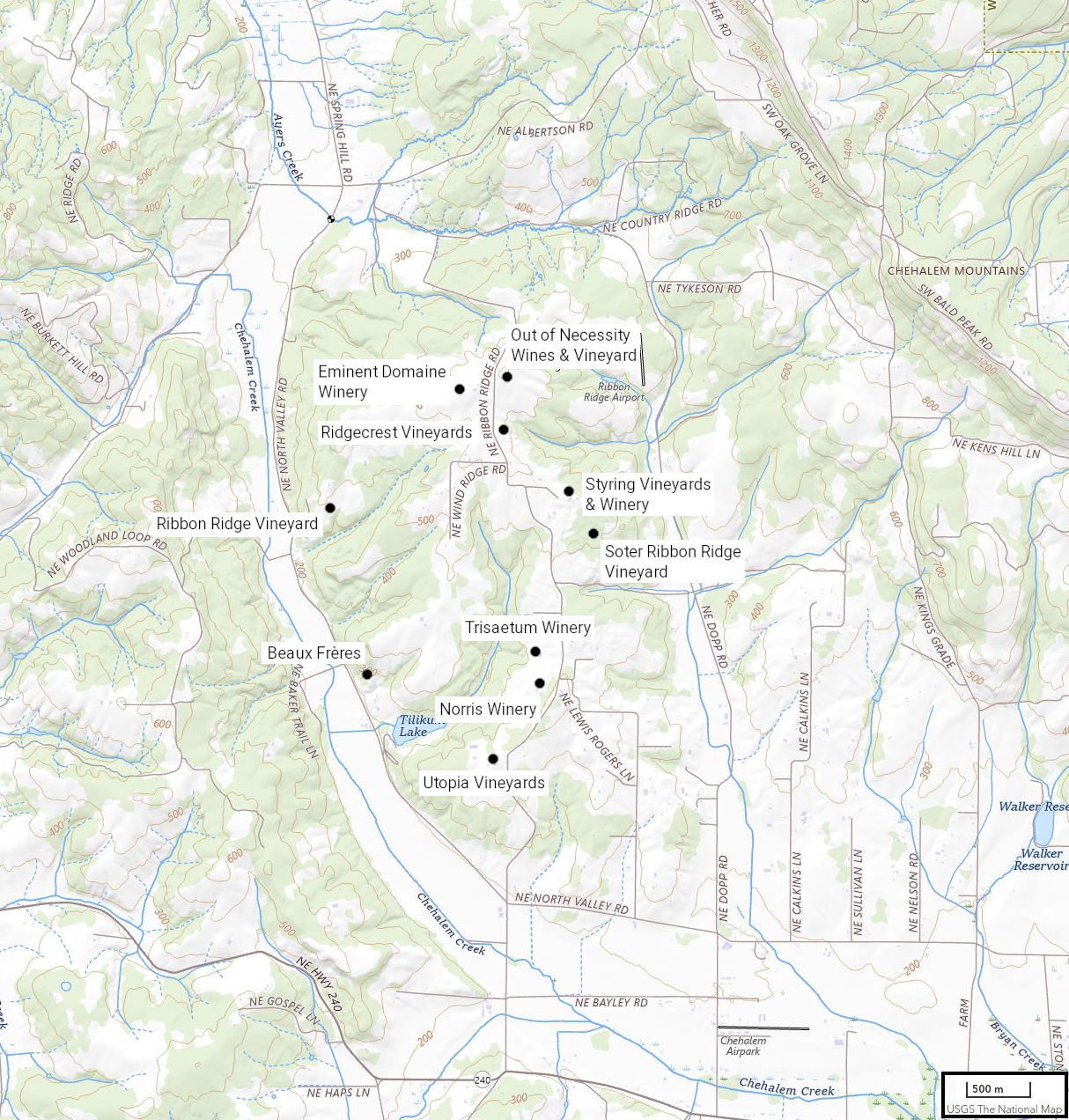
Ribbon Ridge, located between Newberg and Gaston, is isolated from other nearby hills by creek valleys. Its 36 vineyards and wineries are indicated.

Ribbon Ridge was named in 1865 by Colby Carter, an early settler from Missouri, and known by that name ever since. The first official use of the name dates to 1888 with the creation of Ribbon Ridge School District No. 68 by Yamhill County Schools. The school opened its doors in 1889 with 24 pupils from the farms and cabins atop the ridge that lies between Chehalem Creek to the west and the creek known locally as Dopp Creek to the east. In 1891, Yamhill County School Superintendent L.H. Baker told a McMinnville newspaper that Ribbon Ridge School District No. 68 "is making a good start. A comfortable and well-furnished schoolhouse has been built." The school was still in use through at least 1953. Ribbon Ridge School is referenced on several maps submitted as evidence supporting this petition.
Vineyard activity began on Ribbon Ridge in 1980 with the establishment of Ridgecrest Vineyards by Harry Peterson-Nedry beginning with 12 acres (5 ha). The first commercial vineyard was established in 1982 with the planting of 54 acres (22 ha) of Pinot Noir and Chardonnay. Yamhill Valley Vineyards first used grapes from these vineyards in wine production in 1985. It is estimated that between 1,000 to 1,400 acres (405–567 ha) in Ribbon Ridge is suitable for cultivating premium wine grapes. Fourteen vineyards and three wineries are currently located on Ribbon Ridge, with 286 acres currently planted. Four additional vineyards and three additional wineries are currently in the planning stage and should be developed within the next 3 years. Vineyards or winery operations now own in excess of 700 acres (283 ha) on Ribbon Ridge. In 1965, David Lett planted the first Pinot Noir vines in the Willamette Valley despite its risk at the time. As Peterson-Nedry commented in 2023, "The general wisdom was that Ribbon Ridge was too far west to get ripe, too much into the Coast Range shadow and too high in elevation, being just shy of 700 feet." Peterson-Nedry's vineyard, called Ridgecrest Vineyards, at the time had 40 planted acres (16 ha). By 2023, the area had 12 commercial wineries and 36 vineyards with 620 cultivated acres (251 ha).

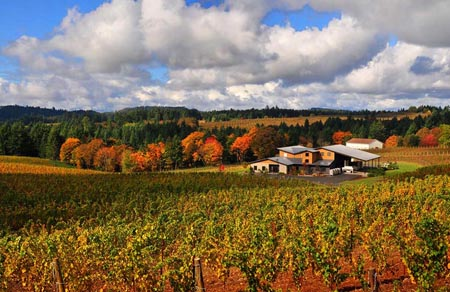
Trisaetum Winery in the Ribbon Ridge of Willamette Valley

== Terroir ==
=== Topography ===
Ribbon Ridge is 3.5-mile long (6 km) and 1.7-mile wide (3 km) on a north–south axis. It is geographically separated from the adjacent hills by creek valleys and defined by local geographic boundaries and an uplift of ocean sediment. The Ridge is located at about 45°21′N 123°04′W, with an elevation about 700 feet (213 m) and is noted for its "topographic isolation" and "island-like appearance—a distinct geological formation of eastward-tilted, marine sedimentary strata that dates to the upper Eocene geological era." From climate and geographical considerations, the vineyard sites face southeast and southwest. In this orientation, the morning fogs tend to linger on the Ridge, allowing for milder temperatures in the summer.
The petitioners state the Ribbon Ridge viticultural area extends southward from the Chehalem Mountains and rises above the floor of the Chehalem Valley from approximately 200 to 683 feet (61–208 m). The area is defined as 240 feet (73 m) in elevation or higher and is enclosed by a 9.85-mile (16 km) county road loop. The area contains south-sloped plantings at elevations over 240 feet (73 m) to avoid valley soils but beneath the cooling effects of higher elevation where the maximum height is 683 feet (208 m). The area between these two elevation lines receives maximum heat accumulation, as well as good air and water drainage.
Degree-day accumulations in the area average 2,455, as compared to 2,541 at McMinnville (southwest of Ribbon Ridge) and 2,650 at Portland (northeast of Ribbon Ridge). The data on Ribbon Ridge is typical of hillside sites with earlier starts to warming, less nighttime temperature drops, and clipped heat spikes in midsummer that provide a consistent climate for adequate ripening. According to the petitioners, these features allow longer, cooler growing seasons, which are ideal for delicate varietals like Pinot Noir, Chardonnay, and Pinot Gris. To the best of their knowledge, the petitioners state that all of the existing vineyards in the viticultural area are located between 240 to 680 feet (73–207 m). Further, they believe the 240-foot (73 m) contour line minimum height boundary will exclude alluvial soils, which are not best suited for viticulture.

=== Climate ===
Ribbon Ridge's island-like characteristics and the proximity of surrounding landmasses tend to shield and uniquely protect the area from many of the extremes that affect the other agricultural microclimates in the northern Willamette Valley. Air and water drainage exist on all sides. Low clouds tend to accumulate on the surrounding hilltops; fog tends to settle on the valley floor in early and late parts of the growing season. The Coast Range and Yamhill mountains to the west encourage weather systems to drop moisture before reaching Ribbon Ridge and to moderate wind extremes from Pacific storms. The Chehalem Mountains, Bald Peak, and Portland hill systems to the north tend to protect this area from the Columbia Gorge and eastern Oregon weather systems that deliver cold in the winter and heat or winds in the summer. The Dundee Hills to the south shield Ribbon Ridge from extreme winds that funnel coastal weather systems through the Van Duzer corridor, whether hot, cold, or wet in the summer or winter. The petitioners provided an analysis of compiled daily weather data comparing exposed valley floor weather stations such as Salem (south of Ribbon Ridge), McMinnville (southwest of Ribbon Ridge), and Portland Airport (east of Ribbon Ridge) to hillside vineyard stations on Ribbon Ridge (Whistling Ridge). The analysis indicates a tendency towards slightly warmer and drier conditions on grape- growing hillsides of the northern valley, such as the Ribbon Ridge viticultural area. These apparent differences are even more significant during the grape-growing season (April–October), when the nature of hillside warming is especially important in achieving ripening similar to that of warm valley sites without the risk of frost or the problems of excess soil moisture. Specifically, hillside data showed higher minimum (2–3 °F) and maximum (2–7 °F) daily temperatures during early and late growing seasons than those of exposed valley floor sites. This moderation permits early growth in the spring, consistent and even ripening with retention of acids over the summer, and a long, full ripening in the fall. The petitioners supplied data suggesting precipitation on protected hillsides in the Ribbon Ridge area is up to 10 inches (254 mm) less, approximately 25 percent, than it is on unprotected valley sites. Growing season precipitation is reduced even farther, with 7.7 inches (196 mm) accumulated April–October on average, or approximately 35 percent reduction from the Coast Range or valley floor sites. For example, the annual rainfall at Whistling Ridge in the Ribbon Ridge viticultural area averages 29 inches (737 mm)as compared to 36 inches (914 mm) for the Portland International Airport, (located east of the area), 39 inches (991 mm) for Salem (south of Ribbon Ridge), while the Coast Range, located west of the Ribbon Ridge, has an average range of 80 inches (2,032 mm) to more than 100 inches (2,540 mm) per year. Further, the petitioners state that Ribbon Ridge's annual rainfall is less than other wine growing regions in the immediate vicinity, such as Yamhill-Carlton District's 42 inches (1,067 mm), Chehalem Mountains' 37 to 60 inches (940–1,524 mm), and Dundee Hills' 30 to 45 inches (762–1,143 mm). The USDA plant hardiness zone is 8b.

=== Soils ===
Ribbon Ridge soils are relatively uniform, all being marine sedimentary and fine-textured (mainly Willakenzie series) at plantable elevations, without significant alterations from slides and erosion. Specifically, Ribbon Ridge is a distinct, natural, geological formation of eastward-tilted marine sedimentary strata dated to the upper Eocene. The Keasey Formation, exposed on the western side of the Ridge, is laminated to massive, pale gray, tuffaceous mudstone, to fine tuffaceous sandstone. The overlying Pittsburg Bluff Formation, exposed in the central and eastern side of the Ridge, is a massive to thick-bedded gray to tan, weathering, feldpathic litharenite with tuffaceous mudstone and sandstone. The petitioners assert that within the region Ribbon Ridge is unusual in the presence of only these two geological strata and the intact nature of these formations. Further, they contend that, because the ridge is ancient and stable, the soils from these fine sedimentary parent materials are well weathered and consequently are, on average, deeper in profile and more finely structured than soils in surrounding areas. As a consequence of its geological history, the soils of Ribbon Ridge are distinct from those of adjacent vineyards in several significant ways. Unlike the Chehalem Mountains to the north and east, the soils of ribbon Ridge are entirely derived from marine sedimentary parent materials. They are distinctly different from the alluvial sedimentary soils that constitute, in part or entirely, areas to the east of Ribbon Ridge or to the south in the Chehalem Valley flood plain. They are different from the adjacent volcanic soils in the Chehalem Mountains and Red Hills of Dundee American viticultural areas. The petitioners also offered evidence that the soils of Ribbon Ridge are related but distinctly different from the marine sedimentary hillsides (mainly Willakenzie and Peavine Series) to the west of Chehalem Creek Gorge in the Yamhill-Carlton area in that they are younger, finer, and more uniform due to finer parent materials of sandstone, siltstone, and mudstone.

== See also ==
- Eyrie Vineyards, originator of Oregon Pinot noir
- Oregon wine
- List of Oregon wineries and vineyards
