= Growing degree-day =

Heuristic tool in phenology

Growing degree days (GDD), also called growing degree units (GDUs), are a heuristic tool in phenology. GDD are a measure of heat accumulation used by horticulturists, gardeners, and farmers to predict plant and animal development rates such as the date that a flower will bloom, an insect will emerge from dormancy, or a crop will reach maturity. GDD is credited to be first defined by Réaumur in 1735.

== Introduction ==
In the absence of extreme conditions such as unseasonal drought or disease, plants grow in a cumulative stepwise manner which is strongly influenced by the ambient temperature. Growing degree days take aspects of local weather into account and allow gardeners to predict (or, in greenhouses, even to control) the plants' pace toward maturity.

Unless stressed by other environmental factors like moisture, the development rate from emergence to maturity for many plants depends upon the daily air temperature. Because many developmental events of plants and insects depend on the accumulation of specific quantities of heat, it is possible to predict when these events should occur during a growing season regardless of differences in temperatures from year to year. Growing degrees (GDs) is defined as the number of temperature degrees above a certain threshold base temperature, which varies among crop species. The base temperature is that temperature below which plant growth is zero. GDs are calculated each day as maximum temperature plus the minimum temperature divided by 2, minus the base temperature. GDUs are accumulated by adding each day's GDs contribution as the season progresses.

GDUs can be used to: assess the suitability of a region for production of a particular crop; estimate the growth-stages of crops, weeds or even life stages of insects; predict maturity and cutting dates of forage crops; predict best timing of fertilizer or pesticide application; estimate the heat stress on crops; plan spacing of planting dates to produce separate harvest dates. Crop specific indices that employ separate equations for the influence of the daily minimum (nighttime) and the maximum (daytime) temperatures on growth are called crop heat units (CHUs).

== GDD calculation ==
GDD are calculated by taking the integral of warmth above a base temperature T_{base} (dependent on the plant type; see baseline section):

$$\text{GDD} = \frac{T_\mathrm{max}+T_\mathrm{min}}{2}-T_\mathrm{base}.$$

If the minimum temperature T_{min} is below T_{base}, there exist two variants:

- Variant A: Do not change $T_\mathrm{min}$. Only if $(T_\mathrm{max}+T_\mathrm{min})/2 < T_\mathrm{base}$, set $(T_\mathrm{max}+T_\mathrm{min})/2 = T_\mathrm{base}$. The resulting GDD is 0. This can be written more compactly as $\text{GDD} = \max\left\{\frac{T_\mathrm{max}+T_\mathrm{min}}{2}-T_\mathrm{base},0\right\}$
- Variant B: Change $T_\mathrm{min}<T_\mathrm{base}$ to $T_\mathrm{min}=T_\mathrm{base}$.

GDDs are typically measured from the winter low. Any temperature below T_{base} is set to T_{base} before calculating the average. Likewise, the maximum temperature is usually capped at 30 °C because most plants and insects do not grow any faster above that temperature. However, some warm temperate and tropical plants do have significant requirements for days above 30 °C to mature fruit or seeds.

=== Example of GDD calculation ===
For example, a day with a high of 23 °C and a low of 12 °C (and a base of 10 °C) would contribute 7.5 GDDs.

$$\frac{23+12}{2}-10=7.5$$

As a second example, a day with a high of 13 °C and a low of 5 °C (and a base of 10 °C) would contribute:

- Version A: 0 GDD, as $\max\{(13+5)/2-10, 0\}=0$
- Version B: 1.5 GDDs, as $(13+10)/2-10=1.5$

== Plant development ==
Common name	Latin name	Number of growing degree days baseline 10 °C
Witch-hazel	Hamamelis spp.	begins flowering at <1 GDD
Red maple	Acer rubrum	begins flowering at 1–27 GDD
Forsythia	Forsythia spp.	begin flowering at 1–27 GDD
Sugar maple	Acer saccharum	begin flowering at 1–27 GDD
Norway maple	Acer platanoides	begins flowering at 30–50 GDD
White ash	Fraxinus americana	begins flowering at 30–50 GDD
Crabapple	Malus spp.	begins flowering at 50–80 GDD
Common broom	Cytisus scoparius	begins flowering at 50–80 GDD
Horsechestnut	Aesculus hippocastanum	begin flowering at 80–110 GDD
Common lilac	Syringa vulgaris	begin flowering at 80–110 GDD
Beach plum	Prunus maritima	full bloom at 80–110 GDD
Black locust	Robinia pseudoacacia	begins flowering at 140–160 GDD
Catalpa	Catalpa speciosa	begins flowering at 250–330 GDD
Privet	Ligustrum spp.	begins flowering at 330–400 GDD
Elderberry	Sambucus canadensis	begins flowering at 330–400 GDD
Purple loosestrife	Lythrum salicaria	begins flowering at 400–450 GDD
Sumac	Rhus typhina	begins flowering at 450–500 GDD
Butterfly bush	Buddleia davidii	begins flowering at 550–650 GDD
Corn (maize)	Zea mays	800 to 2700 GDD to crop maturity
Dry beans	Phaseolus vulgaris	1100–1300 GDD to maturity depending on cultivar and soil conditions
Sugar beet	Beta vulgaris	130 GDD to emergence and 1400–1500 GDD to maturity
Barley	Hordeum vulgare	125–162 GDD to emergence and 1290–1540 GDD to maturity
Wheat (hard red)	Triticum aestivum	143–178 GDD to emergence and 1550–1680 GDD to maturity
Oats	Avena sativa	1500–1750 GDD to maturity
European corn borer	Ostrinia nubilalis	207 – Emergence of first spring moths

== Pest control ==
Insect development and growing degree days are also used by some farmers and horticulturalists to time their use of organic or biological pest control or other pest control methods so they are applying the procedure or treatment at the point that the pest is most vulnerable. For example, when using a baseline of 10 °C:

- Black cutworm larvae have grown large enough to start causing economic damage at 166 GDD
- Boxwood leafminer adults emerge at about 139 GDD
- The first annual generation of birch leafminer adults emerge between 48 and 203 GDD and the second annual generation between 319 and 524 GDD
- The first annual generation of fall webworm larvae emerge between 350 and 749 GDD, the second between 791 and 1540 GDD, and the third between 1580 and 1790
- Mimosa webworm larvae's first appearance averages 543 GDD
- Oak lace bug's first annual egg hatch occurs between 311 and 652 GDD, the second between 869 and 1048 GDD, and the third between 1260 and 1306 GDD
- Pine needle scale's first annual egg hatch occurs between 35 and 526 GDD and the second between 1110 and 1511 GDD

== Honeybees ==
Several beekeepers are now researching the correlation between growing degree-days and the life cycle of a honeybee colony.

== Baselines ==
The optimal base temperature is often determined experimentally based on the life cycle of the plant or insect in question. Common baselines for crops are either 5 °C for cool-season plants and 10 °C for warm-season plants and most insect development.

=== Crops ===
- 4.5 °C wheat, barley, rye, oats, flaxseed, lettuce, asparagus,"canning purposes"
- 8 °C sunflower, potato
- 10 °C maize (including sweet corn), sorghum, rice, soybeans, tomato, coffee, grapes, snap beans, lima beans
- 30 °C the USDA measure heat zones in GDD above 30 °C; for many plants this is significant for seed maturation, e.g. reed (Phragmites) requires at least some days reaching this temperature to mature viable seeds

=== Pests ===
- 6 °C Stalk borer
- 7 °C Corn rootworm
- 9 °C Alfalfa weevil
- 10 °C Black cutworm, European corn borer, standard baseline for insect and mite pests of woody plants
- 11 °C Green cloverworm

=== Modified growing degree days ===
In the cases of some plants, not only do they require a certain minimum temperature to grow, but they will also stop growing above a warmer threshold temperature. In such cases, a modified growing degree day is used: the growing degree days are calculated at the lower baseline, then at the higher baseline, which is subtracted. Corn is an example of this: it starts growing at 10 °C and stops at 30 °C, meaning any growing degree-days above 30 °C do not count.

== Units ==
GDDs may be calculated in either Celsius or Fahrenheit, though they must be converted appropriately; for every 9 GDD_{F} there are 5 GDD_{C}, or in conversion calculation:

$$\text{GDD}_\text{C} = \frac{5}{9} \text{GDD}_\text{F}$$

The equivalent unit compliant with the International System of Units is the kelvin-second. A quantity of kelvin-seconds is four orders of magnitude higher than the corresponding degree day (1 Celsius degree-day is 8.64×10^{4} K·s; 1 Fahrenheit degree-day is 4.8×10^{4} K·s).

== See also ==
- Degree day
- Growing season
- Heating degree day
- Weather derivative
- Winkler scale
- Phenology
