= Little Applegate River =

River in the United States of America

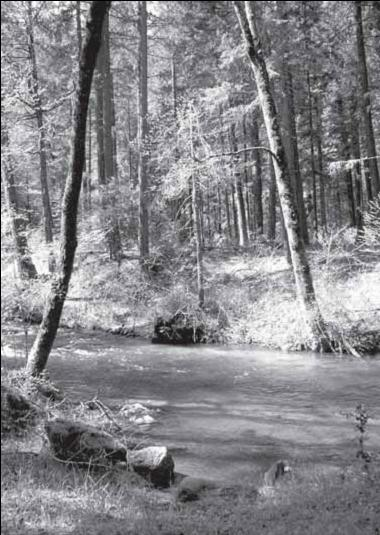
- The Little Applegate River

- Location of the mouth of the Little Applegate River in Oregon
- Etymology: Named after the Applegate River, which in turn was named after Lindsay Applegate

Location
- Country: United States
- State: Oregon
- County: Jackson

Physical characteristics
- Source: Near Siskiyou Peak
  - location: Siskiyou Mountains, Jackson County, Oregon
  - coordinates: 42°03′06″N 122°48′15″W
  - elevation: 5,735 ft (1,748 m) (Note: Source elevation derived from Google Earth search using Geographic Names Information System (GNIS) source coordinates.)
- Mouth: Applegate River
  - location: about 3 miles (4.8 km) northwest of Buncom, Jackson County, Oregon
  - coordinates: 42°11′55″N 123°02′43″W
  - elevation: 1,440 ft (440 m)
- Length: 21 mi (34 km)
- Basin size: 113 mi^{2} (290 km^{2})
- Discharge
  - location: Mouth
  - average: 226 cu ft/s (6.4 m^{3}/s)

The Little Applegate River is a 21-mile-long (34 km) tributary of the Applegate River located in the U.S. state of Oregon. It is part of the Rogue River watershed, draining approximately 113 square miles (293 km^{2}) of Jackson County. Rising in the Siskiyou Mountains, the river flows generally northwest to meet the Applegate about 3 miles (4.8 km) northwest of Buncom and 2 miles (3.2 km) south of Ruch.

The Little Applegate River's watershed was originally settled about 11,000 years ago by the Latgawa, Shasta, and Dakubetede Native American tribes. The first non-indigenous settlers arrived in the early 19th century. Two boomtowns—Sterlingville and Buncom—were founded in the 1850s and grew rapidly as gold and other precious metals were discovered. They slowly declined in population as the supply of gold was exhausted; only three buildings remain in Buncom, while Sterlingville was abandoned and later destroyed.

The Little Applegate watershed supports populations of coho and Chinook salmon, along with 138 known and 134 suspected species of other vertebrates. Sixty-four percent of the watershed is forested, although its health is slowly declining due to fire suppression.

== Course ==
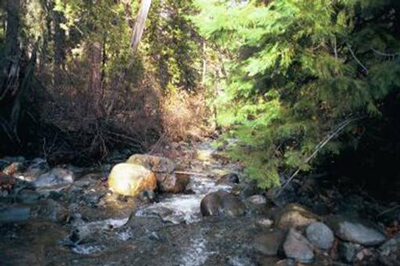
Glade Creek, a tributary of the Little Applegate River

The Little Applegate River arises at several springs near Siskiyou Peak, in the Siskiyou Mountains. It flows north, receiving McDonald Creek on the right, and Glade Creek on the left. Water was diverted into Sterling Ditch near the Little Applegate's confluence with Glade Creek. Sterling Ditch is an approximately 23-mile-long (37 km) aqueduct, built in 1877 to provide water for hydraulic mining in the now destroyed town of Sterlingville.

About one mile downstream of the location where stream flow was diverted from the Little Applegate River into Sterling Ditch, the river turns northwest. Five miles downstream of the diversion is the confluence with another major tributary, Yale Creek, on the left. Yale Creek drains nearly 24 square miles (62 km^{2}), making it the largest of the Little Applegate's tributaries by watershed area. From Yale Creek, the Little Applegate flows northwest, receiving water from Sterling Creek on the right. The town of Buncom is located at the mouth of Sterling Creek.

The stream empties into the Applegate River about 2 miles (3.2 km) northwest of Buncom and 2 miles (3.2 km) south of Ruch, 34 miles (55 km) above the Applegate's confluence with the Rogue River. For fish swimming upstream, the Little Applegate is the last major tributary of the Applegate before the unpassable Applegate Dam. The Little Applegate River's average discharge is 226 cubic feet per second (6.40 m^{3}/s), but can range anywhere from 25 to 424 cubic feet per second (0.708 to 12.0 m^{3}/s) depending on the season and the amount of precipitation.

== Watershed ==
The Little Applegate drains approximately 113 square miles (293 km^{2}) of southern Oregon. It makes up just under 15 percent of the Applegate River's watershed, and just over 2 percent of the Rogue River basin. The Bureau of Land Management controls 40 percent of the watershed, and another 32 percent is owned by the United States Forest Service. Twenty-seven percent is privately owned, and the state of Oregon controls less than one percent. Approximately 96 percent of the land is either forested or woodlots, while farmland and rural areas make up the remaining 4 percent.

The Little Applegate watershed experiences a Mediterranean climate; the average annual precipitation in the watershed is 38 inches (970 mm), however as much as 55 inches (1,400 mm) and as little as 20 inches (510 mm) have been recorded. Precipitation in the area consists of mostly rain, and occasionally snow in the higher elevations.

The primary rock types in the watershed are early Mesozoic metamorphosed sediments and volcanics, ultramafic deposits, and granitoid intrusions, like much of the Siskiyou Mountains. Elevations range from 1,440 feet (438.9 m) at the river's mouth to 7,418 feet (2,261 m) at Dutchman Peak. Streams above about 5,500 feet (1,700 m) have lower gradients because those areas were heavily eroded by glaciers; they then drop quickly until they reach the Little Applegate Valley at about 2,500 feet (760 m), which is fairly flat due to a high amount of alluvial deposits.

== Flora and fauna ==
The watershed is covered predominantly by temperate coniferous forest, which makes up approximately 64 percent of the total area. The primary species in these areas are Douglas-fir, ponderosa pine, madrone, and incense-cedar. Buckbrush and manzanita grow in the drier chaparral regions. Several rare plants including Gentner's fritillary, oblongleaf stonecrop, Siskiyou lewisia, clustered lady's slipper, and splithair Indian paintbrush also grow in the watershed. Seven species of noxious weeds have been identified: three species of thistles, medusahead rye, Scotch broom, St. Johns wort, and tansy ragwort.

Prior to the 1940s, wildfires burned through the Little Applegate River watershed frequently. The United States Forest Service began fire suppression efforts in the 1920s, and a smokejumper station was built about 20 years later. Species that depend on fire to reproduce—such as ponderosa pine—declined in population, while Douglas-fir and white fir spread. Buckbrush and manzanita, normally chaparral plants, encroached on the oak savanna regions. The vegetation in the watershed continues to grow denser, making it more susceptible to insect infestations and disease.

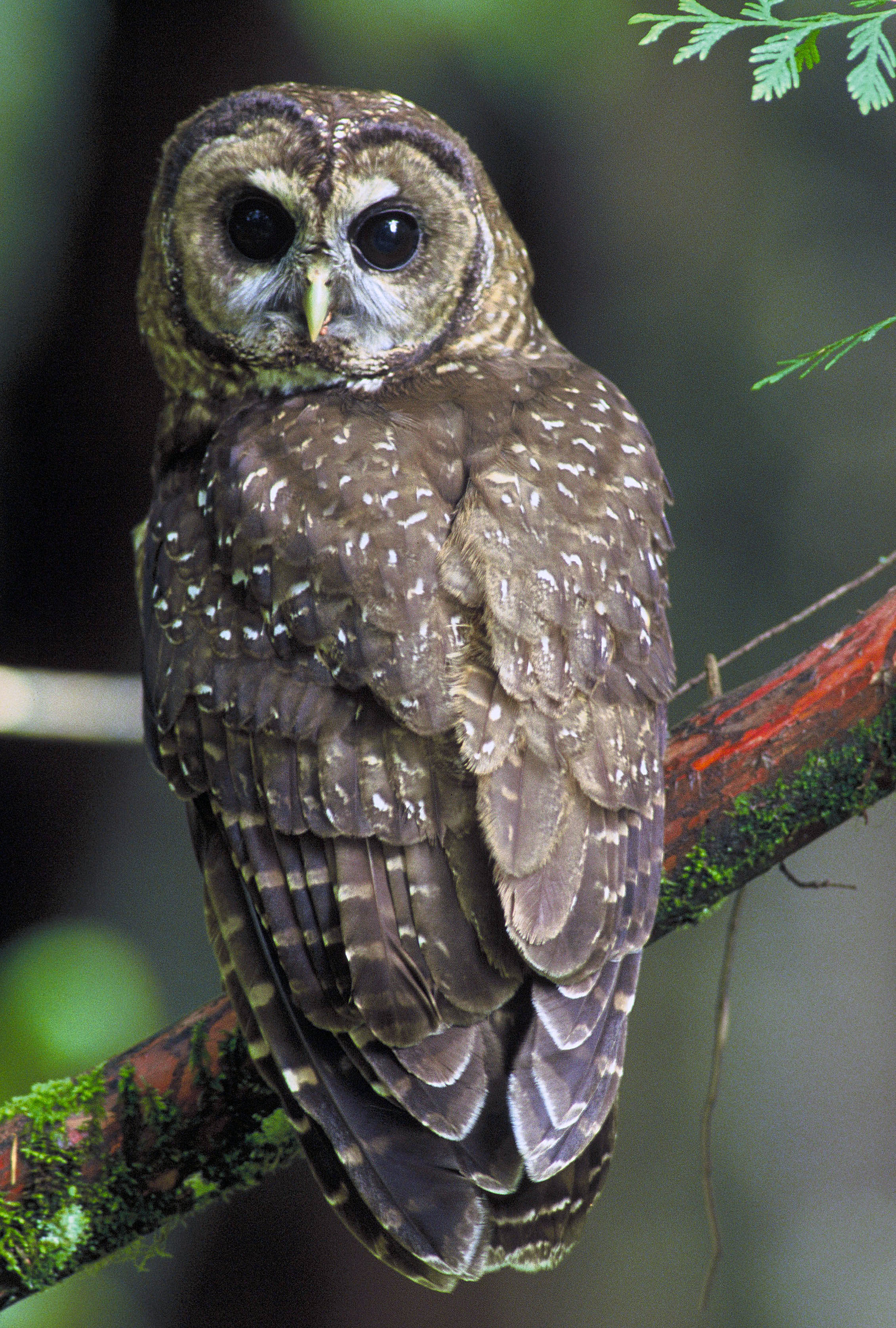
The northern spotted owl

One hundred thirty-eight species of vertebrates are known to live in the Little Applegate's watershed, while another 134 are suspected. Some 37 square miles (96 km^{2}) of the watershed have been designated as Critical Habitat Units for the northern spotted owl, a critically endangered species. Two other species known to live in the watershed are included in the IUCN Red List: the endangered Siskiyou Mountains salamander, and the vulnerable western pond turtle. Bighorn sheep, gray wolves, grizzly bears, and pronghorns once inhabited the region, but are now considered extirpated.

The most common fish inhabiting the river include Chinook salmon, threatened coho salmon, and rainbow trout. Fish populations are declining, however, due to low water quality and barriers such as dams and culverts.

== History ==
Humans have lived in the Little Applegate River watershed for approximately 11,000 years, based on Clovis points discovered in the area. The first inhabitants were most likely the Latgawa, Shasta, and Dakubetede tribes of Native Americans, descendants of the first humans who traveled across the Bering land bridge from Siberia. They fished for salmon, trout, and lamprey, and hunted for deer and elk. They also often set fires to clear brush from prairies and oak savannas, and to promote the growth of certain crops. The fires were limited by the Native Americans, creating a patchwork of burned and unburned land, thus increasing the biodiversity of the watershed.

The first European Americans to visit the area were a group of fur trappers led by Peter Skene Ogden in 1827. The community of Buncom was founded by Chinese miners in 1851 when gold, silver, cinnabar, and chromite were discovered in nearby Jacksonville. In the spring of 1854, James Sterling and Aaron Davis discovered gold in the Sterling Creek area, and hundreds of miners soon arrived. The town of Sterlingville was founded, and by October its population had risen to over 1,500. Mining lasted through the 1850s and 1860s, and much of the riverbeds of Sterling Creek and the lower Little Applegate River were excavated. The Sterling Ditch and several other ditches were constructed in the 1870s, providing water to large hydraulic mining operations in Sterlingville and surrounding regions. The Sterlingville mine quickly became the largest hydraulic mine in Oregon, and possibly the entire western United States.

The mining washed hundreds of thousands of tons of earth and sediment into the Little Applegate and its tributaries, devastating the landscape. The Sterlingville post office opened in 1879, but was closed four years later as the town's population declined. Buncom's post office opened in 1896. By 1910, however, most mining operations had ended, and it was closed in 1918. Hydraulic mines were reopened from 1933 to 1957 during the Great Depression. Three buildings remain in Buncom, but Sterlingville was abandoned and destroyed.

In the late 1990s, 41 irrigators in the lower watershed agreed to transfer their water rights to the nearby Applegate River (supplemented by Applegate Lake), allowing for the removal of two large fish barriers on the Little Applegate River. The first, the Buck and Jones irrigation dam near Buncom, was removed in 2006. The second, the Farmers Ditch irrigation dam, was removed in 2012. Altogether, the removal of the two dams returned 15 cubic feet per second (0.42 m^{3}/s) of water back to the Little Applegate River and opened up 35 miles (56 km) of streams to migrating fish.

== Water quality ==
The water quality of the Little Applegate River watershed is mildly warmer due to some occasional sedimentation, and higher oxygen levels which can occur throughout the region. Some of these issues are created by human activity, some naturally; several forest areas and riparian zones have been cleared to make way for agriculture during the turn of the previous century, and unmaintained road densities have caused slope failures. Hydraulic mining, also at the turn of the previous century near Sterlingville had, in the surrounding landscape, left some slopes bare and sent rocks and gravel downstream. However, the area has recovered over the decades. Cattle and sheep were introduced to the area in the late 19th century. They have in some areas overgrazed areas of the watershed, reducing native grasses and allowing noxious weeds to spread.

A past century contributor to the sedimentation of the Little Applegate River was McDonald Ditch, an irrigation ditch near McDonald Creek. Built in 1918 and 1919 to provide water to residents of nearby Wagner Creek, the ditch has failed several times, sending several tons of dirt and mud downstream. The Talent Irrigation District approved purchasing a $10,300 monitoring system for the ditch in September 2010, and applied for a $100,000 United States Bureau of Reclamation grant to replace the ditch with pipes.

== See also ==
- List of rivers of Oregon
