= Buncombe =

Buncombe may refer to:

- Buncombe (surname)
- Buncombe County, North Carolina
- Buncombe, Illinois
- An alternative spelling of Buncom, Oregon
- wikt:buncombe or wikt:bunkum, a term meaning "nonsense", derived from 19th-century American politics
