= McKee Bridge, Oregon =

Unincorporated community in the state of Oregon, United States

- Unincorporated community
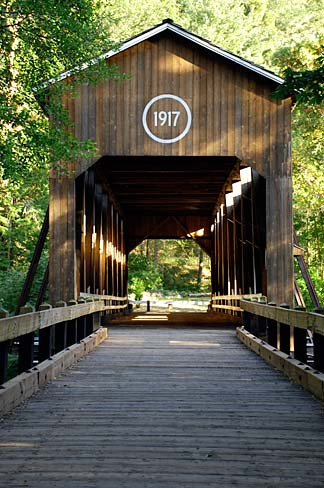
- Pedestrian bridge over the Applegate River at McKee Bridge

- Location within Oregon Location within the United States
- Coordinates: 42.128°N 123.076°W
- Country: United States
- State: Oregon
- County: Jackson
- Elevation: 1,676 ft (511 m)
- Time zone: UTC-8 (Pacific (PST))
  - Summer (DST): UTC-7 (PDT)
- ZIP code: 97530
- Area codes: 458 and 541
- GNIS feature ID: 1135061
- Coordinates and elevation from Geographic Names Information System

McKee Bridge is an unincorporated community in Jackson County, Oregon, United States. It lies south of Ruch along Upper Applegate Road off Oregon Route 238. The Applegate River flows by the community, in the Rogue River – Siskiyou National Forest.

A covered bridge called McKee Bridge crosses the river at this point. McKee Picnic Ground, a national forest site, is at the west end of the bridge along the river.
