= Sturgis Fork =

Stream in Oregon, U.S.

Coordinates: 42°04′26″N 123°12′38″W

Sturgis Fork is a stream in the U.S. state of Oregon. It is a tributary to Carberry Creek.

Sturgis Fork was named in 1900 after one Alonzo J. Sturgis.
