= Harold Turpin =

Harold Turpin could refer to:

- Hal Turpin (1903–1997), American minor league baseball player
- Harold John Turpin, British draughtsman and one of the inventors of the Sten gun
