= McKee Bridge =

Covered bridge in Oregon, US

- U.S. National Register of Historic Places
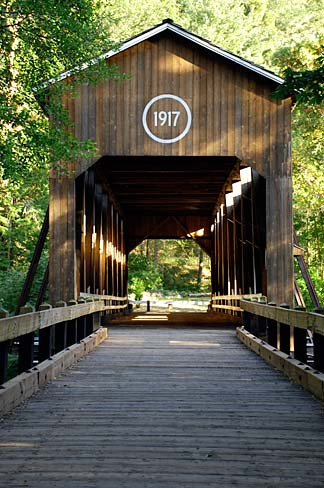
- McKee Bridge over the Applegate River

- Location within Oregon Location within the United States
- Coordinates: 42°07′33.0″N 123°04′21.2″W
- Built: 1917
- Architect: Jason Hartman
- Architectural style: Howe truss
- MPS: Oregon Covered Bridges TR
- NRHP reference No.: 79002074
- Listed: November 29, 1979

The McKee Bridge is a covered bridge in Jackson County in the U.S. state of Oregon. Built on land donated by Adelbert (Deb) McKee, a stage station operator, the bridge originally carried a road over the Applegate River that linked the Blue Ledge Copper Mine to Jacksonville. The site originally included an ore-hauler rest stop, about halfway between the mine and the city, where relief horses were stationed. The bridge, about 8.3 miles (13.4 km) north of the California border, carried mining and logging traffic from the year of its construction, 1917, through 1956. An unincorporated community, McKee Bridge, is near the bridge.

Since 1956, area residents, assisted at times by government funding, have maintained the bridge, which is used by pedestrians but not by motor vehicles. McKee Picnic Ground in the Rogue River – Siskiyou National Forest is at the west end of the bridge along the river. The picnic ground and bridge are about 8.5 miles (13.7 km) south of Ruch along Applegate Road.

The McKee Bridge Historical Society, a nonprofit organization dedicated to maintaining the pedestrian bridge, lists the height of the bridge at 45 feet (14 m), which makes it the highest of the four remaining covered bridges in Jackson County. It is also the longest and oldest of the four.

Closed completely for three years because of rot in structural components as well as damage to the roof, the bridge reopened in June 2015 after major renovations. Grants totaling about $600,000 from the Federal Highway Administration, supplemented by matching funds of about $60,000 raised by the McKee Bridge Historical Society, paid for the project. Mowat Construction Company of Woodinville, Washington, carried out the rehabilitation.

== See also ==
- List of bridges on the National Register of Historic Places in Oregon
- List of Oregon covered bridges
