= Ana Delfosse =

Argentine race-car driver and Formula One mechanic

- Born: Anneliese Hartenau; 1931; Punta Arenas, Chile
- Died: 23 April 2017 (aged 85–86); San Diego, United States
- Occupations: Race-car driver and mechanic
- Spouse: Curt Delfosse

Anneliese Delfosse (née Hartenau; 1931 – 23 April 2017) was an Argentine race-car driver and Formula One mechanic who worked for Grand Prix champion Juan Fangio and later became the first woman to win a pure-speed auto race in Argentina. Born in 1931 near Punta Arenas, Chile, she grew up on a sheep farm in Argentina. Enamored of speed at an early age, she rode a horse called Blitz (German for "lightning"). Watching Fangio driving by the ranch in his racing car led to her involvement with racing cars. At the age of 16, she became part of Fangio's pit crew and later became a driver, racing in the Andes and elsewhere. On June 5, 1960, she won a race in Buenos Aires, driving a Porsche Gordini.

== Biography ==
Ana Delfosse was born Anneliese Hartenau in Punta Arenas, Chile, of German parents. She met her husband, Curt Delfosse, a race-car designer, while working in Fangio's garage in Buenos Aires, and they married in 1955. In 1963, she and her husband immigrated to the United States, where they established an automotive business, Delfosse Racing, in San Diego, and another in Idyllwild. Retiring in 1977, they moved to southern Oregon and built a home along the Little Applegate River. Facing economic problems after the buyer of their California business defaulted on payments, they sold their home and moved to Ashland where they leased and operated a gas station near Interstate 5.

Both died of lung problems associated with frequent exposure to leaded gasoline, asbestos from brake pads, and other toxins that posed risks to race-car mechanics and drivers in the mid-20th century. Curt died in 1998, and Ana died in 2017 while visiting her sister in San Diego. She suffered from scleroderma during her final years.
