= Sterlingville =

Sterlingville may refer to:

- Sterlingville, Oregon, an abandoned mining town, now destroyed
- Sterlingville, New York, a town that was destroyed when Fort Drum expanded
