= Buncom =

Buncom may refer to:

- Buncom, Oregon, a mining town
- Frank Buncom, an American football linebacker
