= Oliver Cromwell Applegate =

American politician (1845-1938)

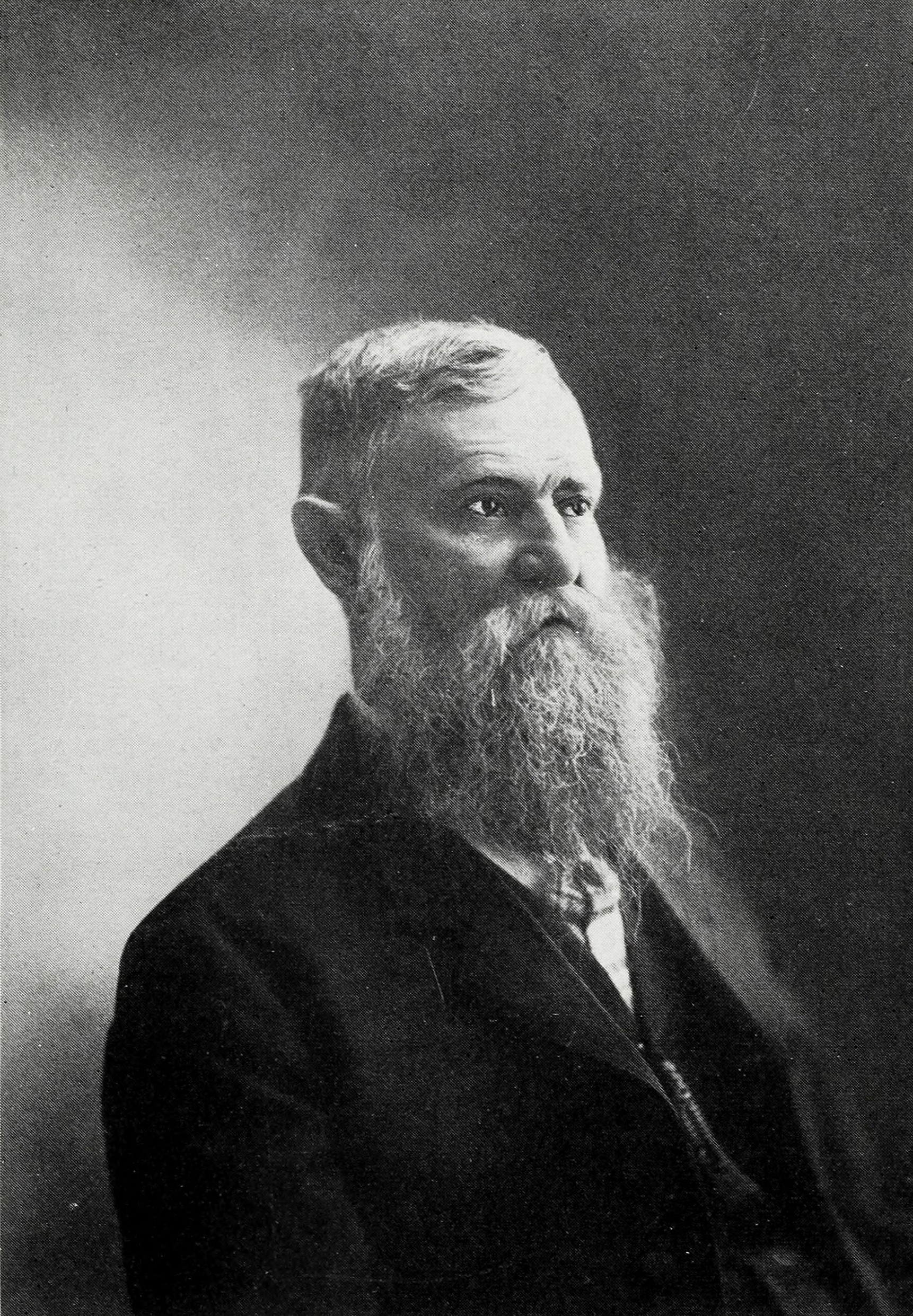
- Applegate in 1912
- Born: June 11, 1845; Yamhill County, Oregon
- Died: October 11, 1938 (aged 93); Klamath Falls, Oregon
- Occupation(s): Politician, newspaper editor, Indian agent

Captain Oliver Cromwell Applegate (June 11, 1845 – October 11, 1938) was an American politician, newspaper editor, and Indian agent in the U.S. state of Oregon. A member of the Applegate family that helped open the Applegate Trail, he was raised in Southern Oregon where he later was in charge of the Klamath Indian Reservation. He worked as a scout during the Modoc War, was an Indian agent for all of Oregon, and was editor of the Ashland Tidings and the Klamath Republican.

== Early years ==
Oliver Applegate was born in a log cabin in Yamhill District, in what is now Polk County, Oregon, on June 11, 1845. At the time the area was part of the Oregon Country, but in 1848 became part of the Oregon Territory. He was the sixth son and seventh child of the well-known pioneer, Lindsay Applegate, a native of Kentucky, and his wife, Elizabeth (Miller) Applegate, who was born in Tennessee in 1816. Lindsay Applegate was one of the leaders of the Great Migration of 1843 which Americanized Oregon and was prominent in the early Indian wars, and as an explorer.

When Oliver Applegate was five years old, the family moved to the Yoncalla Valley in middle western Oregon; there were only three or four other families in that region at that time besides the Applegate contingent, which consisted of the brothers, Charles, Lindsay and Jesse, and their families.

The system of common schools was rudimentary then, and their continuity could not be depended upon for more than a few weeks or months in each year. The Applegate families were fairly well supplied with books, however, to supplement the otherwise meager opportunities for education, and as a rule the scions of these strong frontiersmen availed themselves of every opportunity offered to inform their minds, as well as to become accomplished horsemen, efficient in the use of the rifle and otherwise prepared for the border wars which were liable to occur at any time with the aboriginal inhabitants of the country.

In 1860 the family removed to the Siskiyou Mountains near the California boundary, Lindsay Applegate having become owner of the toll road over the mountains, and in 1862, removed to Ashland, Oregon, which continued to be the family home for many years.

== Career ==
During the winter of 1862, Oliver attended the district school in Ashland, and the next spring received a certificate and in the ensuing fall became the teacher, and for four successive winters, conducted the Ashland school. In the spring of 1863, he became a member of an independent military company, the only one in Southern Oregon, a cavalry company known as the "Mountain Rangers", to which many of the leading citizens of the country belonged. He served as a private in this company the first year, the second year as a sergeant and in the third year was chosen captain, receiving his commissions before he had reached his twentieth year from Addison C. Gibbs, the old war governor of Oregon.

In 1865, his father was appointed United States Indian Agent over the Klamaths and Modocs at Fort Klamath. According to the treaty of 1864, the Indians were to be gathered on the Klamath Reservation. The fort was the only place east of the Cascades in that immediate region where there were any white people. The younger Applegate was appointed assistant to the agent, and that was the beginning of a service that lasted for several years, under various agency administrations, during which time he gained influence over the tribes of southeastern Oregon, which he used to good advantage later when the Modoc outbreak of 1872 occurred. This influence probably more than any other agency resulted finally in the conversion of the most resistant of the Indian tribes into farmers and stockmen.

When 21 years of age, Applegate had charge of a unique company of scouts, called the "Ax and Rifle Company," because every man carried an ax as well as a rifle. This company consisted of fifty men, the captain the only white man, while different chiefs of the various tribes ranked as lieutenants and sergeants. They cleared the way through the pine forests for a great wagon train of provisions and beef cattle that came down to the Klamath agency from The Dalles, marking the first step in the commencement of operations under the treaty of 1864 for the benefit of the southeastern tribes of Oregon. This was during the war with the Snake or Paiute Indians.

For some time before the Modoc outbreak of 1872, Applegate had charge of Yainax sub-agency, forty miles west of the headquarters' agency, then under supervision of Agent Laroy S. Dyar. Near Yainax was located the main band of the Modocs. under the famous old Chief Schonchin, and with him were to be domiciled the turbulent bands under the Modoc chieftain, Captain Jack. The story of how Captain Jack and his band refused to come onto the reservation, and the subsequent events, make up the history of the Modoc War. Applegate played a prominent part in the bloody drama.

In 1873, he became a U.S. Commissioner with jurisdiction committed against the federal law locally.

In 1876, some of Applegate's friends asked to have him appointed general Indian agent for Oregon, assuming that in such a way his unusual experience in the management of Indian affairs could be used to good purpose in promoting progressive conditions to the several agencies in the state. Ex-Senator Nesmith, who was himself a Democrat, was an ardent advocate of the plan and wrote as follows, to Hon. Zach Chandler, Grant's Secretary of the Interior, with whom he had served in the U.S. Senate: "Mr. Applegate is a gentleman of culture and ability, and, unlike myself, he is a prominent Republican and is as honest as is possible for a man to be possessing his perverted political notions. You will pardon me, I know, for proposing appointments to an administration which I do not indorse, but I do so in order to promote the reforms which you have so happily inaugurated." In 1898, Applegate took charge of the Klamath Reservation as United States Indian agent, and served as such for five years. Congress then discontinued the position of agent and he was appointed bonded superintendent of the agency and training school, a position which he resigned after serving two years.

During this period of seven years he helped establish Indian claims to over half a million dollars for lands excluded from the reservation by erroneous boundary surveys, and developed comprehensive plans for irrigation and drainage, which added to the wealth of the reservation, an area approximating in size the state of Delaware.

He was identified with various enterprises looking to the development of southern Oregon, and had a reputation as a writer of both prose and verse.

== Later years and family ==
Applegate served as editor of the Ashland Tidings starting in 1878, and later edited the Klamath Republican.

In 1878, Applegate was married to Miss Ella Anderson, a daughter of Rev. Jesse Marion Anderson, a pioneer Methodist minister, who was widely known in southern Oregon as a man of ability and worth. The bride, like the groom, was a native of Oregon, having been born in the territory in 1855. They had three sons and three daughters. Frank Lindsay, the oldest, was born October 10, 1879; Annie Elizabeth, September 13, 1881; Laroy Gilbert, August 19, 1885; Rachel Emma, November 23, 1887; Jennie Margaret, April 5, 1894; and Oliver C. Jr., July 5, 1896. As of 1912, Applegate resided at Klamath Falls, Klamath County, Oregon. In politics, he was a Republican and a delegate to the Republican National Convention at Chicago in 1892. Oliver C. Applegate died on October 11, 1938, at the age of 93. He is the namesake of Applegate Peak in Crater Lake National Park.
