= Copper, Jackson County, Oregon =

- Ghost town
- Location within Oregon Location within the United States
- Coordinates: 42°1′35″N 123°8′48″W
- Country: United States
- State: Oregon
- County: Jackson
- Time zone: UTC-8 (Pacific (PST))
  - Summer (DST): UTC-7 (PDT)
- GNIS feature ID: 1140097

Copper is a former community in Jackson County, Oregon, United States. Copper was located about 1 mile (1.6 km) north of the Oregon–California border, near the mouth of Carberry Creek. Copper was named for the copper mining in the region, including at the Blue Ledge mine just over the state line in California. The town had a post office from 1924 until 1932. The elevation of Copper is 1,949 feet.

The townsite was inundated in 1980 when Applegate Lake was formed by damming the Applegate River.

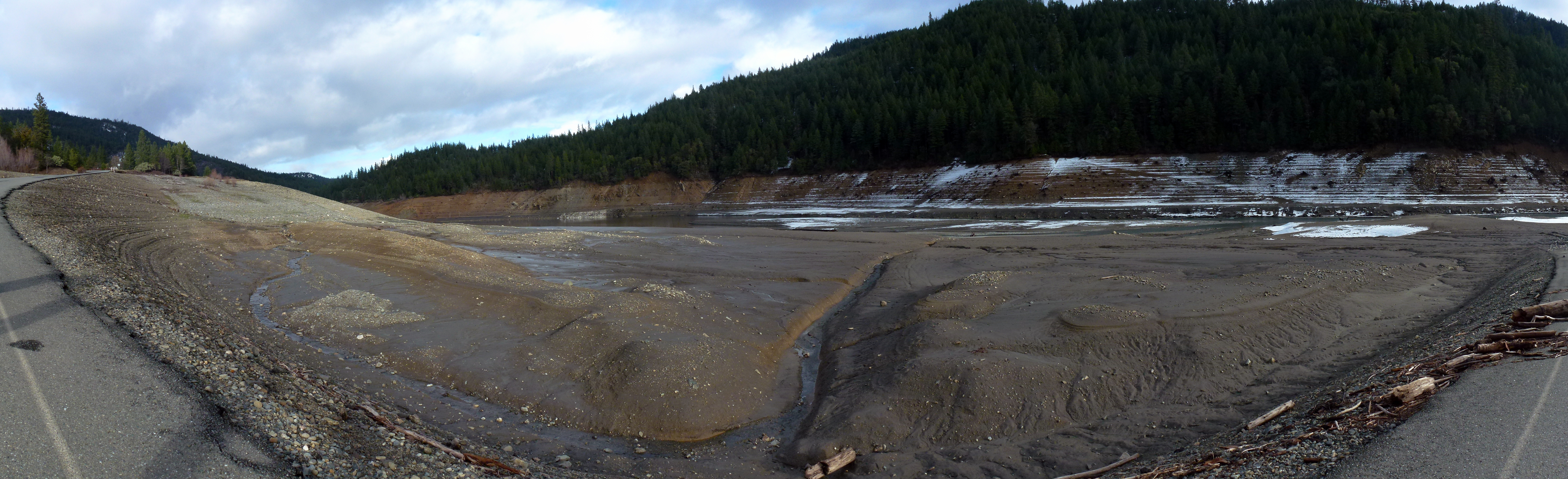
Mud flats at the south end of Applegate Lake where the town of Copper formerly stood. This area is usually submerged beneath over 60 feet (18 m) of water. The road, now a boat ramp, is the remains of the highway that once served Copper.
