= Jane Hutchison =

Jane Hutchison may refer to:

- Jane Campbell Hutchison (1932–2020), American art historian
- Jane Denio Hutchison (1871–1942), president of the Tri County Federation of Women's Clubs
