= Steve Fork =

Stream in California and Oregon, U.S.

Coordinates: 42°04′26″N 123°12′38″W

Steve Fork is a stream in the U.S. states of California and Oregon. It is a tributary to Carberry Creek.

Steve Fork was named in the 1870s after one Stephen Oster.
