= Williams, Oregon =

Unincorporated community in the state of Oregon, United States

- Census-designated place
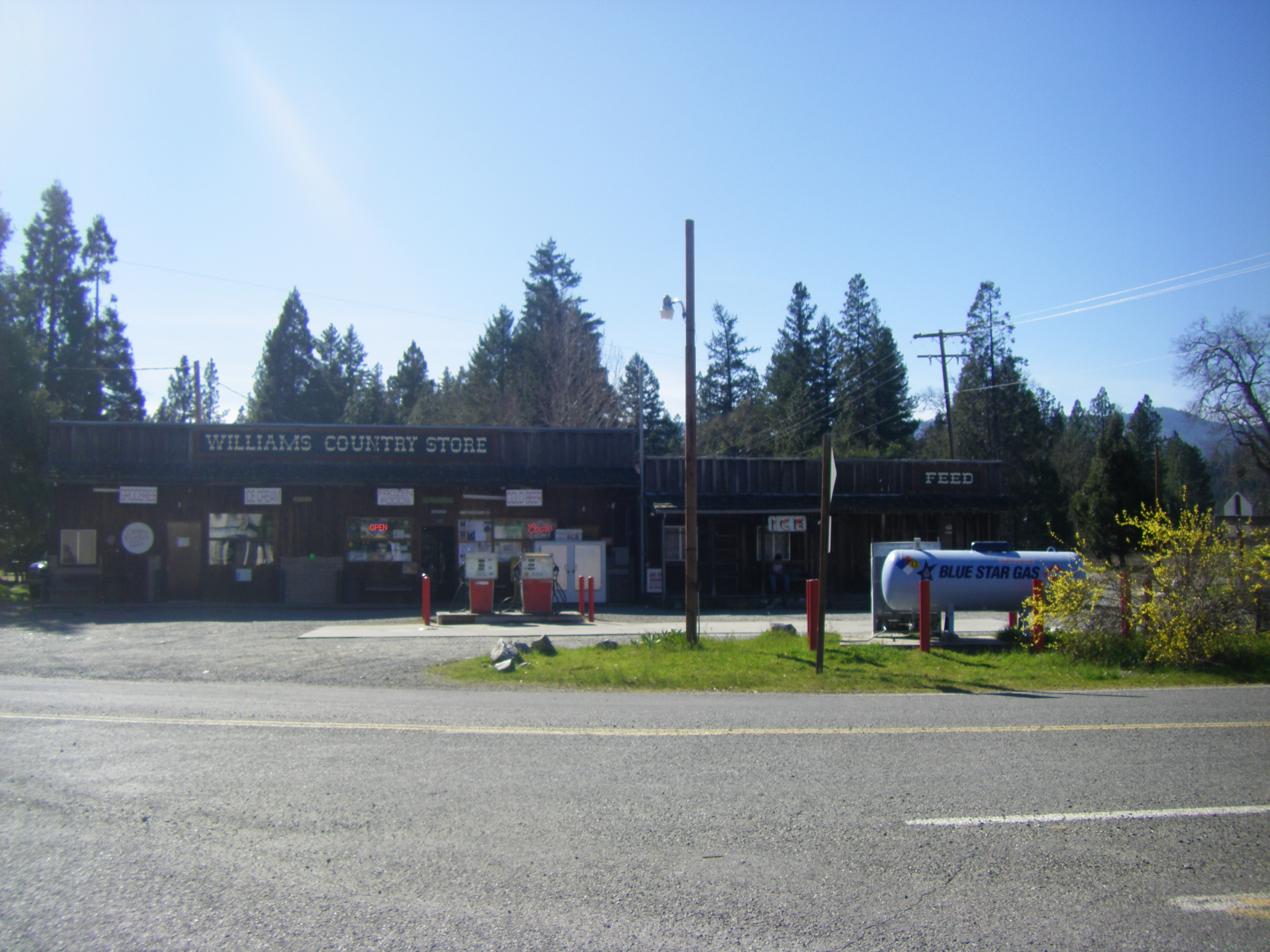
- Williams Country Store

- Location within Oregon Location within the United States
- Coordinates: 42°13′8″N 123°16′24″W
- Country: United States
- State: Oregon
- County: Josephine
- Settled: 1881

Area
  - Total: 11.32 sq mi (29.33 km^{2})
  - Land: 11.32 sq mi (29.33 km^{2})
  - Water: 0 sq mi (0.00 km^{2})
- Elevation: 1,380 ft (420 m)

Population (2020)
  - Total: 1,102
  - Density: 97.3/sq mi (37.57/km^{2})
- Time zone: UTC-8 (Pacific)
  - Summer (DST): UTC-7 (Pacific)
- ZIP code: 97544
- Area code: 541
- FIPS code: 41-82450
- GNIS feature ID: 1152385

Williams is an unincorporated community and census-designated place (CDP) in Josephine County, Oregon, United States. As of the 2020 census, Williams had a population of 1,102.

There were three different post offices in the area named for their proximity to Williams Creek: Williams, Williamsburg and Williams Creek (in Jackson County). Williams Creek, which flows into the Applegate River, was named for Captain Robert Williams, who fought against Rogue River Indians along the creek during the Rogue River Wars of 1855–6. Williams post office was established in 1881 and is about six miles upstream from Provolt on Williams Creek, and two miles west of the Jackson-Josephine county line. The community is served by the Three Rivers School District; Williams Elementary School is located in the community.

== Geography ==
Williams is in southeastern Josephine County, in the valley of Williams Creek, a north-flowing tributary of the Applegate River and part of the Rogue River watershed. It sits to the northeast of the Siskiyou Mountains and is 6 miles (10 km) south of Provolt and 19 miles (31 km) south of Grants Pass, the Josephine county seat.

According to the U.S. Census Bureau, the Williams CDP has an area of 11.3 square miles (29.3 km^{2}), all of it recorded as land.

== Demographics ==
Historical population
Census	Pop.	Note	%±
2020	1,102		—
U.S. Decennial Census

In 2022, Williams, OR had a population of 1.17k people with a median age of 43.2 and a median household income of $81,310. Between 2021 and 2022 the population of Williams, OR grew from 1,033 to 1,173, a 13.6% increase and its median household income grew from $70,739 to $81,310.

== Climate ==
This region experiences hot and dry summers, with the average temperatures for July and August reaching above 80 °F. According to the Köppen Climate Classification system, Williams has a warm-summer Mediterranean climate, abbreviated "Csb" on climate maps.

Climate data for Williams
Month	Jan	Feb	Mar	Apr	May	Jun	Jul	Aug	Sep	Oct	Nov	Dec	Year
Record high °F (°C)	60 (16)	89 (32)	74 (23)	87 (31)	92 (33)	95 (35)	102 (39)	101 (38)	98 (37)	89 (32)	68 (20)	61 (16)	102 (39)
Mean daily maximum °F (°C)	46.7 (8.2)	51 (11)	55.7 (13.2)	62.9 (17.2)	68.7 (20.4)	77.3 (25.2)	84.5 (29.2)	83.3 (28.5)	76.1 (24.5)	66.2 (19.0)	53.9 (12.2)	47 (8)	64.4 (18.0)
Mean daily minimum °F (°C)	31.2 (−0.4)	30.6 (−0.8)	33.1 (0.6)	36 (2)	40.9 (4.9)	45 (7)	48.6 (9.2)	48.2 (9.0)	43.5 (6.4)	37.4 (3.0)	32.8 (0.4)	31.5 (−0.3)	38.2 (3.4)
Record low °F (°C)	15 (−9)	4 (−16)	19 (−7)	22 (−6)	26 (−3)	5 (−15)	35 (2)	35 (2)	29 (−2)	22 (−6)	10 (−12)	14 (−10)	4 (−16)
Average precipitation inches (mm)	6.15 (156)	3.99 (101)	3.67 (93)	1.92 (49)	1.43 (36)	0.64 (16)	0.25 (6.4)	0.38 (9.7)	0.73 (19)	2.25 (57)	5.09 (129)	6.63 (168)	33.12 (841)
Average snowfall inches (cm)	4.3 (11)	2.2 (5.6)	1.8 (4.6)	0.2 (0.51)	0 (0)	0 (0)	0 (0)	0 (0)	0 (0)	0 (0)	0.5 (1.3)	2.5 (6.4)	11.5 (29)
Average precipitation days	14	11	13	10	8	4	1	2	4	7	12	14	100

== Notable residents ==
- Steve Miller, musician - from 1976 to 1986, Miller owned the Lippincott-Wagner House and a 420-acre (170 ha) ranch here. In 2015, it was placed on the National Register of Historic Places.

== See also ==
- Applegate Valley
- Rogue Valley
- Siskiyou Mountains
