= A Day with the Cow Column in 1843 =

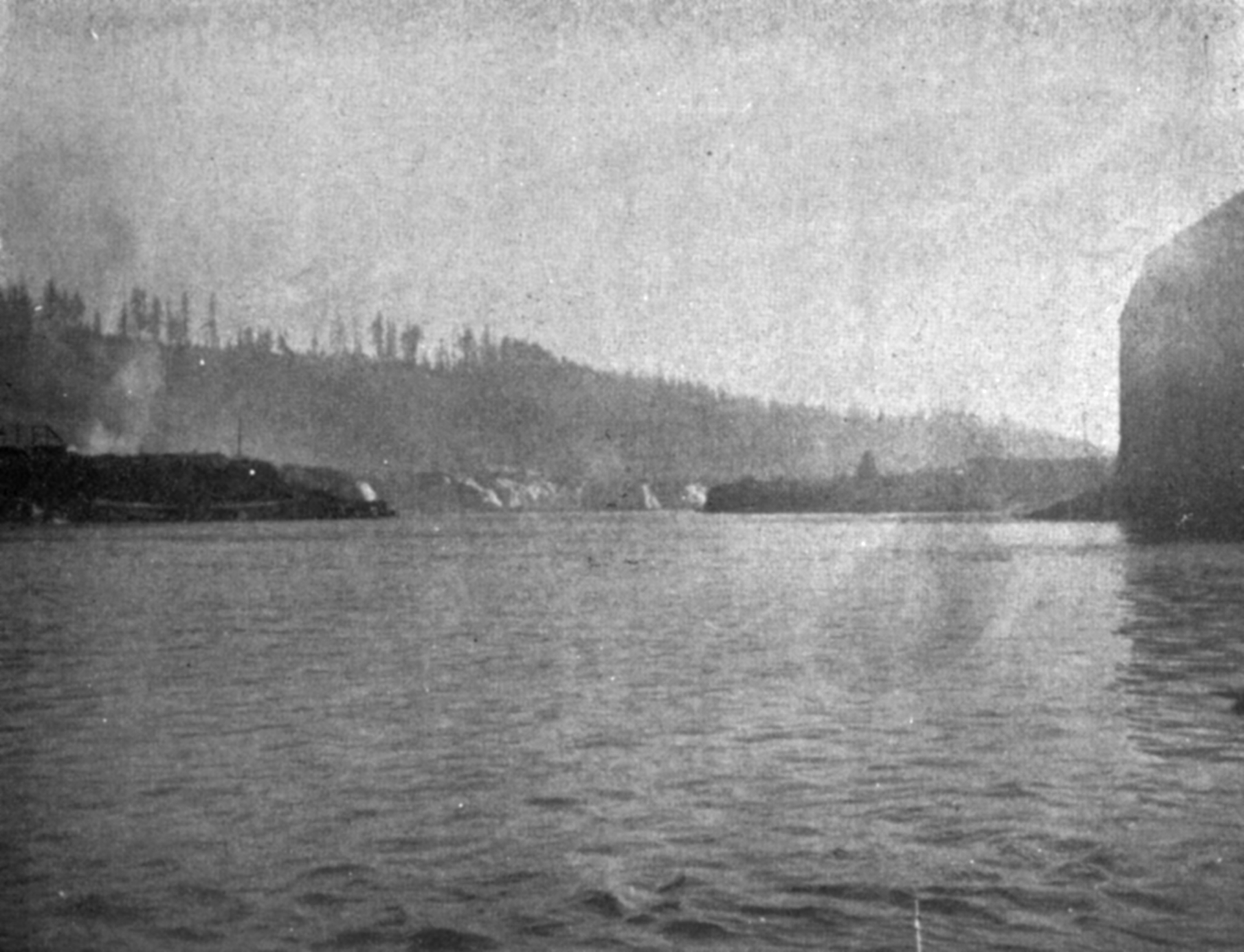
The essay was republished in vol. 1 (1900) of the Oregon Historical Quarterly, along with a number of photographs of sites along the emigration route. This is Willamette Falls, described in the caption as "the objective point of the pioneers."

A Day with the Cow Column in 1843 is a text composed by Jesse Applegate describing his experience leading one of the parties of pioneers to the Oregon Country in the Pacific Northwest of North America in 1843. It was published in the first volume of Overland Monthly in 1868, read before the Oregon Pioneer Association in 1876, published in the first volume of the Oregon Historical Quarterly in 1900, published in a book published by Joseph Schafer in 1934, and published by Ye Galleon Press in 1990.

It was described as "Without question the best bit of literature left to us by any participant in the [Oregon] pioneer movement, and dealing with that movement" by Philip H. Parrish in his review of Joseph Schafer's book. According to another review of Schafer's book, the story of the Great Migration of 1843 would have been "too fantastic to believe if it were not a commonplace of American history." The essay is cited as a prime example of the accounts of emigrants to Oregon, California, and Utah through the Platte River valley, and its frequency of republication noted.

The Oregon Cultural Heritage Commission included it among 100 books that best define the state and its people in 2005.

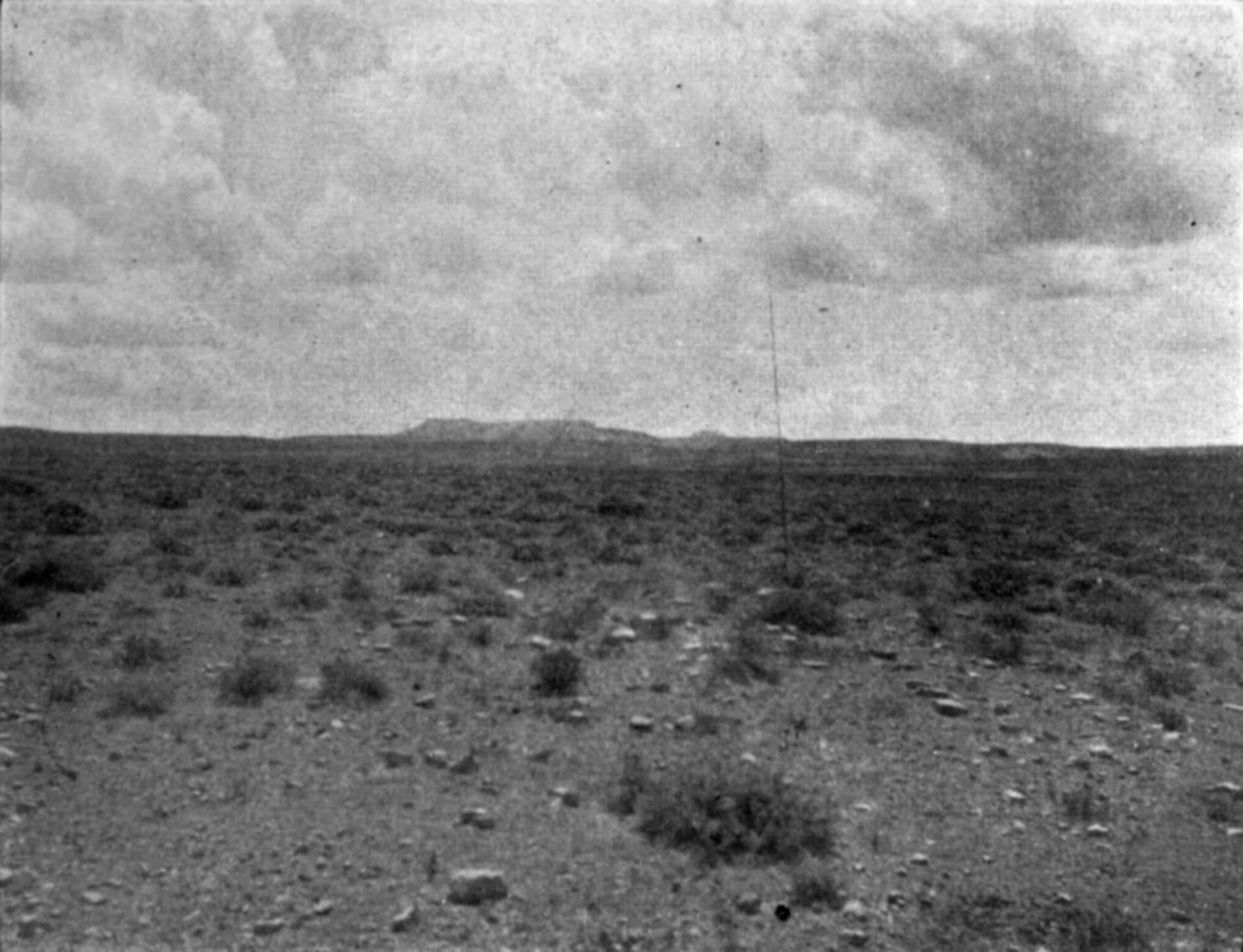
Buttes seen from South Pass, Wyoming, along the route of the emigrants.
