= Gertrude B. Wilder =

American activist and educator (1874–1955)

- Born: March 19, 1874; Boston, Massachusetts, U.S.
- Died: April 12, 1955 (aged 81)
- Resting place: Mountain View Cemetery, San Bernardino, California, U.S.
- Education: Boston Normal School
- Occupations: Activist; educator
- Spouse: Henry Jason Wilder (m. 1900)
- Children: 1

Gertrude Bent Wilder (March 19, 1874 – April 12, 1955) was an American activist and educator who worked as a president of the San Bernardino County Federation of Women's Clubs.

== Early life ==
Gertrude Bent Wilder was born in Boston, Massachusetts, on March 19, 1874, the daughter of Joel Woodbury Bent and Elizabeth Houston. She graduated from Boston Normal School.

== Career ==
Wilder was the president of the San Bernardino County Federation of Women's Clubs. She taught in schools of Boston and Washington, D.C.

She helped to fund and was the president of the Harmonic Club of San Bernardino from 1926 to 1927. She was one of the pioneers to bring fine music to San Bernardino. The Harmonic Club was a San Bernardino musical organization from which the San Bernardino Valley Concert Association was formed. She was president of the Redlands Contemporary Club.

She was a member of the Highland Woman's Club, the California History and Landmarks Society, the Delphian Society.

She was the secretary of the San Bernardino chapter of the American Red Cross.

== Personal life ==
Wilder lived in Washington, D.C. and in 1921 moved to California, where she lived at Highland, California. On August 16, 1900 she married Henry Jason Wilder, director of the County Agricultural Extension Service and farm adviser. They had one son who died an infant in 1902.

She died on April 12, 1955, and is buried at Mountain View Cemetery, San Bernardino, California.
