= Dolly Lee Williams Breece =

American clubwoman (1888–1981)

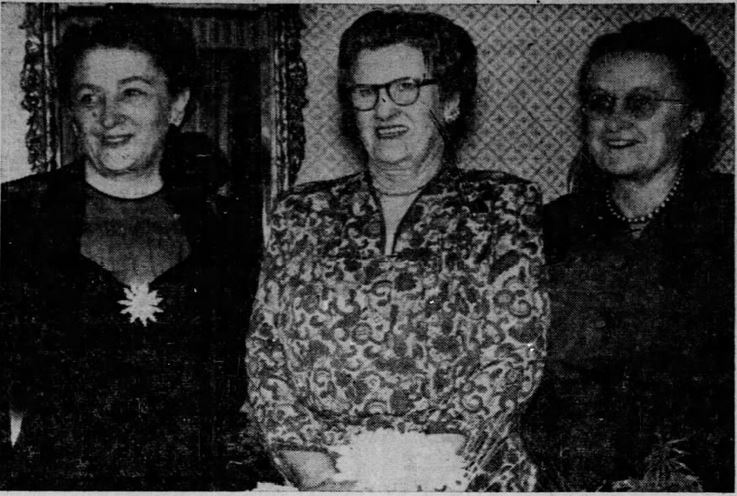
From l to r: Mrs. Philip Hubbell, Dolly Lee Williams Breece, Mrs. Frank Darrow

Dolly Lee Williams Breece Bacon (1888-1981) was an American clubwoman.

== Early life ==
Dolly Lee Williams was born in 1888, in Kanawha County, West Virginia.

== Career ==
Dolly Lee Breece was active in woman's club and civic activities. She was a member of the Delphian Society. In 1946, she was elected board member of the Christian Kent Day Nursery.

== Personal life ==
Breece moved to New Mexico in 1919 and lived at 809 W. Copper Avenue and then 1401 Roma Avenue NE, Albuquerque, New Mexico.

In 1919, she married Col. George Elmer Breece (died January 23, 1942), former mayor of Charleston, West Virginia. At the time, she was a widow living in Charleston and Colonel Breece was a widower.

At the death of her husband in 1942, Breece was sued by the Breece Lumber Co. in a matter to do with the transfer of 2000 shares in the company to her by her husband, who had been the company president. The suit also sought a repayment of dividends, amounting to about US$16,000 ($249,220.13 in 2017), which the company claimed were paid to Breece on the stock. The company also sought a voiding of the setting up of a joint bank account by George E. Breece for him and his wife, and a repayment of the $27,894.82 she had withdrawn from the account. In 1944, District Judge Henry G. Coors ruled that Breece was the owner of the 2000 shares and of the balance in the Breeces' joint bank account. She was also granted $6,000 bequeathed to her by George E. Breece's will.

In 1952, she married for a third time. C.C. Bacon was a prominent Carlsbad, New Mexico, business man who owned the Bacon Motor Co. He was active politically and was chosen by New Mexico to vote for Dwight D. Eisenhower in the Electoral College.

She died in 1981 and is buried at Sunset Memorial Park, Albuquerque.
