= Jesse Applegate =

American pioneer (1811–1888)

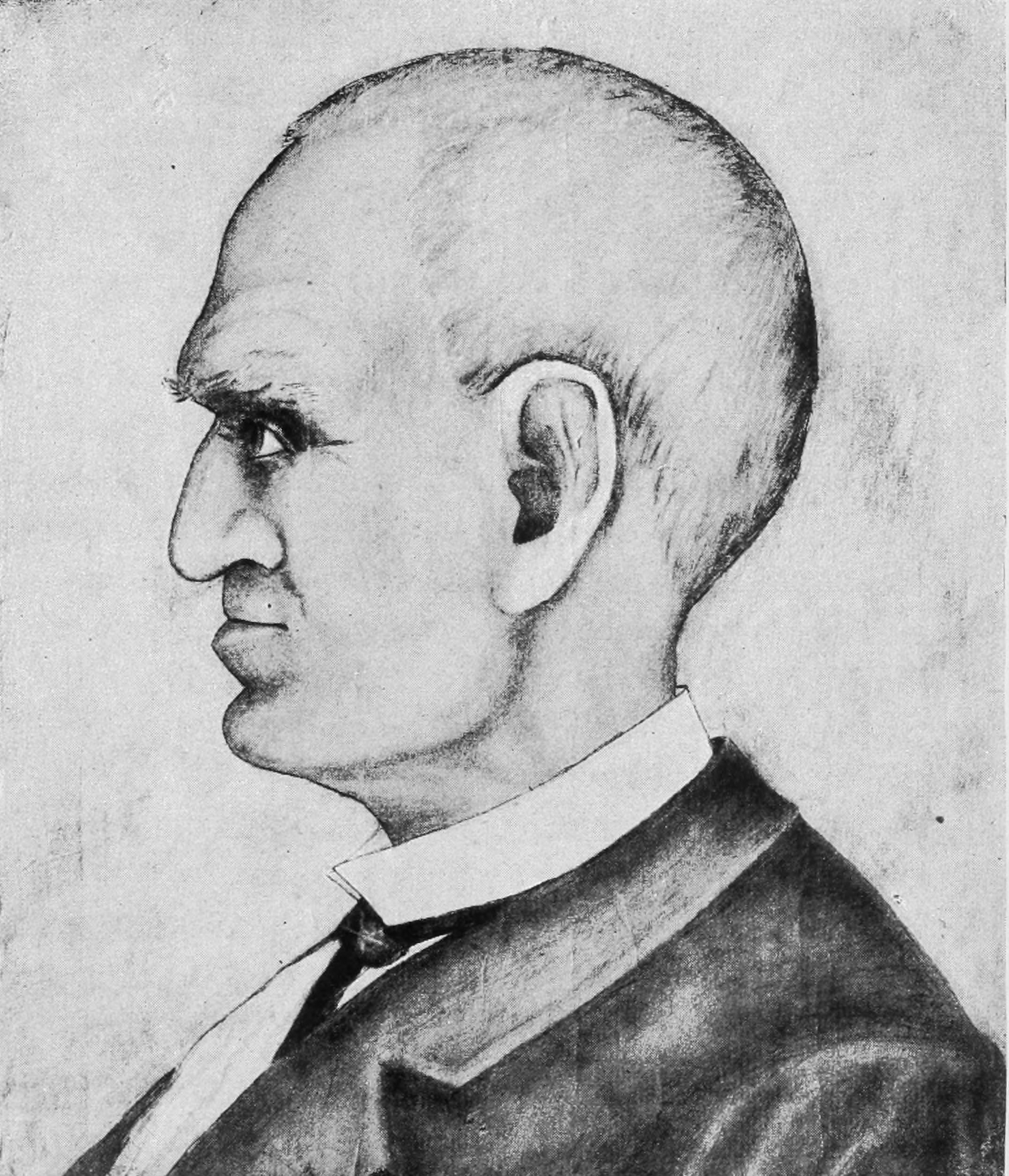

Member of the Provisional Legislature of Oregon
- In office 1845–1845
- Preceded by: none
- Constituency: Yamhill District

Member of the Provisional Legislature of Oregon
- In office 1848–1849
- Succeeded by: position dissolved
- Constituency: Polk District

Member of the Oregon Constitutional Convention
- In office 1857
- Constituency: Umpqua County

Personal details
- Born: July 5, 1811 Henry County, Kentucky
- Died: April 22, 1888 (aged 76) Yoncalla, Oregon
- Party: Republican
- Spouse: Cynthia Ann Parker
- Relations: Lindsay Applegate (brother); Oliver Cromwell Applegate (nephew)
- Occupation: farmer

Jesse Applegate (July 5, 1811 – April 22, 1888) was an American pioneer who led a large group of settlers along the Oregon Trail to the Oregon Country. He was an influential member of the early government of Oregon, and helped establish the Applegate Trail as an alternative route to the Oregon Trail.

== Early life ==
Jesse Applegate was born in Henry County, Kentucky, on July 5, 1811. In 1821, he moved with his family to Missouri where he soon was employed in the law office of Edward Bates. He attended seminary in Illinois, worked as a schoolteacher, clerk, and deputy surveyor to the Missouri Surveyor General, where he met Jedediah Smith, William Sublette, and David Edward Jackson—men who were instrumental in blazing the Oregon Trail. Applegate married Cynthia Ann Parker on March 13, 1831, and settled outside Osceola, Missouri, on the Osage River the next year. His farmstead lasted for twelve years, with the labor force primarily slaves from neighboring farms, despite Applegate not owning any personally.

== The Great Migration ==
Along with his brothers Charles and Lindsay and their families, he joined what became known as the "Great Migration of 1843" on the Oregon Trail. He became one of the leaders of the expedition after it split into two parties over a dispute about whether the large amounts of livestock being driven by some members of the group would slow down their travel. Applegate's party became known as the "cow column" and the other party was called the "light column". He memorialized the journey in an essay that gained in fame in the ensuing decades, "A Day with the Cow Column in 1843".

After leaving their guide Marcus Whitman at his mission and abandoning their wagons at Fort Walla Walla, the Applegate brothers built boats for traveling down the Columbia River to Fort Vancouver. Near The Dalles, a boat capsized and Jesse and Lindsay each lost a son to drowning. Lindsay later wrote, "We resolved if we remained in the country, to find a better way for others who might wish to emigrate."

== Settlement and involvement in politics ==
In 1844, Jesse Applegate started a farm in present-day Polk County, and also built a mill and worked as a surveyor, including surveying the site of Oregon City. During the elections for the Legislative Committee of the Provisional Government of Oregon 1845, Applegate was elected without his prior knowledge as the representative of Yamhill County (one of five counties in Oregon at the time). Soon, he was appointed, along with David Hill and Robert Newell, to draft a revision of the Organic Laws, eventually being voted and adopted by the settler population.

The Provisional Government had tense relations with the Hudson's Bay Company centered on Fort Vancouver across the Columbia River, and Applegate led the way for a political settlement. He created a new oath for members of the government that was inclusive for British subjects as well as American citizens. In a meeting with John McLoughlin and James Douglas, the Yamhill legislator was able to induce the men to join the Provisional Government. A previous episode of an American squatting on Fort Vancouver's farmland and his subsequent threat of burning the Fort down helped produce the agreement. The Provisional Government was to tax the Hudson's Bay Company only on transactions with the settlers. Douglas was one of the judges elected to the newly established Vancouver district, encompassing the lands of north of the Columbia. Upon hearing of an upcoming battle between two men over a woman, Applegate was able to get dueling banned.

The Cayuse War was one of the last series of events in Oregon that Applegate was active in. After the Whitman massacre, a commission led by Applegate contacted Douglas to request a loan from the HBC, to fund a military intervention. Douglas stated that he was not authorized to make a loan, but recommended the peace keeping mission of Peter Ogden sent to the Cayuse. A loan of $999.41 was raised from the contributions of Applegate, Asa Lovejoy and George Abernethy, with others raised as well. Due to the isolation of the settler communities in the Willamette Valley Joseph Meek and Applegate were appointed to request aid from other parts of the United States. Meek traveled to Washington, D.C., to deliver a memorial written by Applegate appealing for military support. While attempting to reach his destination of California, Applegate had to turn back due to the mountain passes being impossible to traverse in the winter.

== Applegate Trail ==
A safer alternative to boating the Columbia River was still needed for settlers wishing to reach the Willamette Valley. The Barlow Road was safer than the river passage, but was considered to be worst stretch of the entire Oregon Trail. Another attempt at finding an alternate route, the Meek Cutoff, resulted in the deaths of at least 23 people. Applegate wrote legislation that authorized him to survey a southern route to the Willamette Valley that would avoid the Columbia River. Daniel Waldo, one of Applegate's fellow emigrants from the Great Migration of 1843, was made the expedition's outfitter. Also known as the South Road, the Applegate Trail started at Fort Hall in present-day Idaho and followed the Humboldt River before crossing the Klamath Basin. Jesse Thornton traveled along the trail in 1846, its first year, and later accused Applegate of starving his party to give him a stronger negotiating position for giving relief. Applegate was however defended by men who surveyed the road.

== Later life ==
Applegate settled on a land claim in the Umpqua Valley in 1849. He named the place Yoncalla after the local Indian tribe. In 1857, he represented Umpqua County at the Oregon Constitutional Convention though he withdrew from the gathering before it was complete. In an address in 1865, Applegate expressed a then-progressive position that "Every member of the commonwealth, no matter of which sex, what color or where born, if free from the tutelage imposed by the domestic relations should have the right to vote, if morally and mentally qualified to do so." Applegate died on April 22, 1888, and is buried in a small private cemetery near Yoncalla, Oregon with his wife.
