= Sallie Wagner =

American anthropologist

- Sallie Wagner, from a 1990 newspaper
- Born: Sarah Roberts Wagner; June 7, 1913; Wheeling, West Virginia
- Died: August 20, 2006 (aged 93); Santa Fe, New Mexico
- Other name: Sallie Wagner Lippincott
- Occupations: Anthropologist, businesswoman, filmmaker, arts patron, writer

Sarah Roberts "Sallie" Wagner (June 7, 1913 – August 20, 2006) was an American anthropologist, businesswoman, activist, filmmaker, and arts patron. She was one of the founding members of the Society for American Archaeology in 1934.

== Early life and education ==
Sarah Roberts "Sallie" Wagner was born in Wheeling, West Virginia, the daughter of Dwight Wagner and Elsie Whitaker Wagner. She began amateur archaeological explorations in her youth, collecting artifacts from her family's farm and along the Ohio River. She attended boarding school in Washington, D.C., and earned a bachelor's degree in anthropology at the University of Chicago in 1936.

== Career ==
While she was still a student, Wagner became one of the founding members of the Society for American Archaeology. After college, she worked in Arizona at the Canyon de Chelly National Monument, with her husband. From 1938 to 1950, the couple ran the Wide Ruins Trading Post north of Chambers, Arizona. She made 16mm films documenting their lives at the trading post. They sold the post to the Navajo Tribal Government in 1950. She wrote a memoir of those years, Wide Ruins: Memories from a Navajo Trading Post (1997).

After 1950, Wagner was associated with the Museum of International Folk Art in Santa Fe. She promoted and supported the work of local and indigenous artists, including Navajo painter Beatien Yazz, composer Lucia Dlugoszewski, and dancer Erick Hawkins. She served on boards of trustees and boards of directors for many cultural and educational organizations based in Santa Fe, including the Santa Fe Preparatory School, the Historic Santa Fe Foundation, the Southwestern Association on Indian Affairs, the International Folk Art Foundation, and the School of Advanced Research. She organized the photograph files of the Museum of New Mexico and the New Mexico State Records Center. She helped establish the Santa Fe Rape Crisis and Trauma Treatment Center, St. John's College, and the Santa Fe Animal Shelter. She created a 19-acre easement called "Sallie's Hill", and donated the land to the Santa Fe Conservation Trust.

In 1990 Wagner was honored as a Guardian of Cultural Heritage by Santa Fe Living Treasures. In 1998 she gave an oral history interview to the United Indian Traders Association Oral History Project at Northern Arizona University. Also in 1998, the School for Advanced Research named a visiting scholar residence after her.

== Homes ==
At least two of Wagner's homes were recognized for their architectural significance. The 1951 Lippincott-Wagner home in Williams, Oregon, designed by Winfield Scott Wellington, is "considered one of the finest examples of post-World War II Contemporary architectural design in Southern Oregon"; musician Steve Miller owned the house from 1976 to 1986, and it was registered with the National Register of Historic Places in 2015. Her Spanish pueblo-style home in Santa Fe was designed and built by aviator Katherine Stinson in 1929.

== Personal life and legacy ==
Wagner married archaeologist William Julian Lippincott in 1936. During World War II, Wagner lived in Berkeley, California, while her husband was serving in the United States Navy. They divorced in the 1960s. She died from cancer in 2006, aged 93 years, in Santa Fe.

The Library of Congress has a small collection of Wagner's papers, mostly involving her support for the dance company run by Erick Hawkins. The Indian Arts Research Center at the School of Advanced Research established the Sallie R. Wagner Indigenous American Fellowship in her honor in 2004; winners have included musician Robert Mirabal and Guatemalan ceramicist Carlos Chaclán.
