= Klamath Republican =

The Klamath Republican
- Type: Weekly newspaper
- Format: Seven column folio
- Founder: W.E. Bowdoin
- Founded: April 26, 1896
- Ceased publication: March 13, 1914
- Political alignment: Republican
- Language: English
- City: Klamath Falls, Oregon
- Country: United States
- Circulation: 1,400 (as of 1914)
- OCLC number: 41290697

The Klamath Republican was an American newspaper published in Klamath Falls, Oregon from 1896 to 1914.

== History ==
The first issue of the Klamath Republican was issued on April 26, 1896. In 1897, the publisher was the Republican Publishing Company. It was a weekly publication.

In 1896, the Klamath Republican was a four-page newspaper, with pages measuring 18 inches by 24 inches. The Republican's format was a seven-column folio. An annual subscription to the Republican cost $2 in 1897. In 1896 the editors and publishers were Bowdoin and Loosley. The newspaper, as its name shows, was a proponent of the Republican Party.

The final publication was volume 18, number 49, published on March 13, 1914. The Klamath Republican had a successor newspaper, the Semi-Weekly Herald, which began publication on March 16, 1914, with volume 18, issue number 50.

The Republican was established by W.E. Bowdoin, who had previously published the Klamath County Star, and whose father, J.A. Bowdoin, had also been in the newspaper business. In 1897, Bowdoin took on a partner, Milan A. Loosley, who, in July 1898, became the sole publisher. In June 1899, Loosley sold the newspaper, and for a brief time it was published by the Republican Publishing Company, of which Charles J. Roberts was the manager. On September 21, 1899, W.H. Huse & Son, from Ponca, Nebraska, bought the Republican. They made additions to the plant and improvements to the newspaper. Wesley O. Smith bought the Republican on April 30, 1903, and still owned the newspaper as of 1905. Oliver Cromwell Applegate also served as editor of the Republican for a time.

In 1914, Wesley O. Smith was still the publisher and editor. The newspaper was published every Thursday, and had a reported circulation of 1,400. Wesley O. Smith was also the editor of the Herald, which became the successor newspaper to the Republican.

== Archives ==
Archived microfilm copies of the Klamath Republican are held at the University of Oregon, starting with Volume 4, No. 12 (July 6, 1899).
