= Delphian Society =

National organization that promoted the education of women

The Delphian Society was a national organization that promoted the education of women in the United States. This organization was founded around 1910 in Chicago.

== History ==
The Delphian Society takes its name from the historical Oracle of Delphi of Phocis, Greece. "Here in remote times Apollo was believed to reveal his wishes to men through the medium of a priestess, speaking under the influence of vaporous breath which rose from a yawning fissure. Her utterances were not always coherent and were interpreted to those seeking guidance by Apollo's priests."

In 1913, the Delphian Society wrote, "We know full well today that no priestess upon a tripod can reveal to us the secrets of the future. A thorough understanding of the past must be the safest guide for coming years. No vapor can inspire sudden revelations--the result only of faithful effort and earnest thought. Yet the story of the ancient oracle charms us still and when a name was sought for a national organization, that had for its avowed purposed the promotion of educational interests in a continent, none was deemed more suitable than that which for so many years cast its gracious spell from one sea to another."

The Delphian Society was inspired by influential Harvard President, Charles William Eliot's belief that education serves the purpose of inspiring lifelong learning and those who do not receive it "seem to live in a mental vacuum." However, "Fifteen minutes a day of good reading would have given any one of this multitude a really human life." In response to his call for lifelong learning, the Delphian Society wrote, "To meet this condition, which prevails through the length and breadth of our land, to stimulate a deeper interest, quicken a latent appreciation and facilitate the use of brief periods of freedom for self-improvement, the Delphian Society was organized and the Delphian Course of Reading made possible."

In 1913, the Delphian Society published the Delphian Course of Reading: "A systematic plan of education, embracing the world's progress and development of the liberal arts." This ten volume course covers "history, literature, philosophy, poetry, fiction, drama, art, ethics, music," however, "Mathematics, being in its higher forms essential to few, has been omitted; languages, requiring the aid of a teacher, and such sciences as make laboratories necessary, are not included.". It also published The World's Progress

In 1928, the Delphian Society published several volumes of books containing an outline of human knowledge for the use of conversation.

More educational volumes were published by the society in the following decades, such as The Delphian Text, The Delphian Course, Orientation for Modern Times, and Patterns for Modern Living.

There are continuing chapters of the society, such as the Houston Assembly of Delphian Chapters.

== The Delphian Course of Reading Volumes ==
Volume	Part 1	Part 2	Part 3	Part 4	Part 5	Part 6
1	Egypt	Babylonia and Assyria	The Hebrews and Their Neighbors			
2	The Hebrews and Their Neighbors cont’d	Hebrew Literature	Greek Mythology	The Story of Greece	Social Life in Greece	Greek Literature
3	Greek Literature cont’d	Philosophy	The Story of Rome			
4	The Roman Principate	Social Life in Rome	Latin Literature	The Middle Ages		
5	The Middle Ages cont’d	Mediaeval Stories	The History of Music	The Conduct of Life		
6	The Renaissance	Literature of the Renaissance	Descriptions of Italy	Education	Art of Conversation	Modern Italy
7	The Drama	Modern European Drama	Nature Study			
8	Résumé of English History	English Poetry	Western Europe	Résumé of French History	Germany	
9	History of Art	Art Galleries and Museums	Modern Fiction	Nineteenth Century Fiction	Recent Novelists and Storywriters	French Fiction
10	United States History	Famous Historical Addresses	Expositions and Progress	American Painting	American Literature	American Poetry

== Notable Members ==
- Dolly Lee Williams Breece
- Jane Denio Hutchison, Nevada County Delphian Chapter
- Jessie Eldridge Southwick, president of the Alpha Chapter
- Fannie Brown Patrick, president of the Hillcrest Chapter
- Wanda Brown Shaw
- Rachel Applegate Solomon, leader
- Gertrude B. Wilder

== See also ==
- Harvard Classics
