= Wanda Brown Shaw =

American clubwoman and teacher

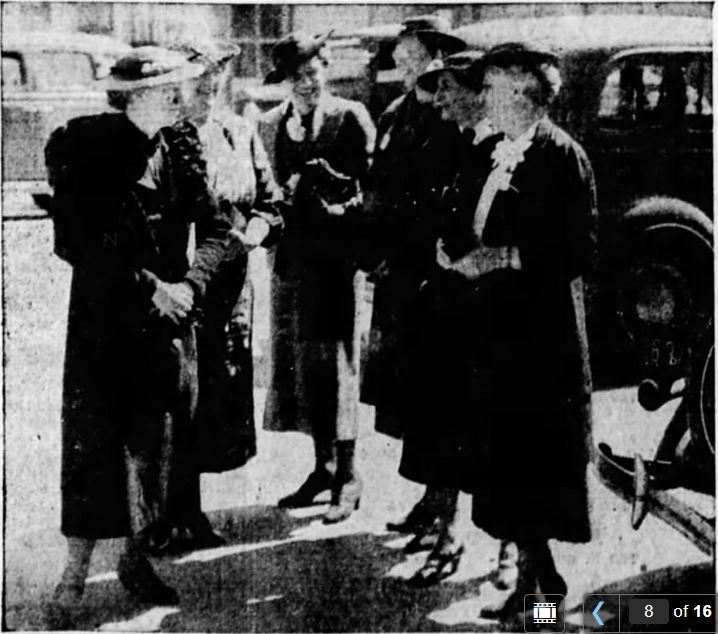
Officers of A.A.U.W. upon arrival in Klamath Falls, Oregon, were met and welcomed by Wanda Brown Shaw. From left to right: Mrs. G.A. Johnson, Mabel Morton, Wanda Brown Shaw, Helen Moor, Mrs. Herbert Howell, Dr. K.W. Jameson, state president and dean of women at Oregon State College

Wanda Brown Shaw (February 14, 1899 – July 20, 1942) was a clubwoman and teacher of Klamath Falls, Oregon.

== Early life ==
Wanda Brown was born in Stayton, Oregon, on February 14, 1899, the daughter of George L. and Lucy E. Brown, a lifelong resident of Oregon.

She obtained an A. B. degree from University of Oregon in 1922.

== Career ==
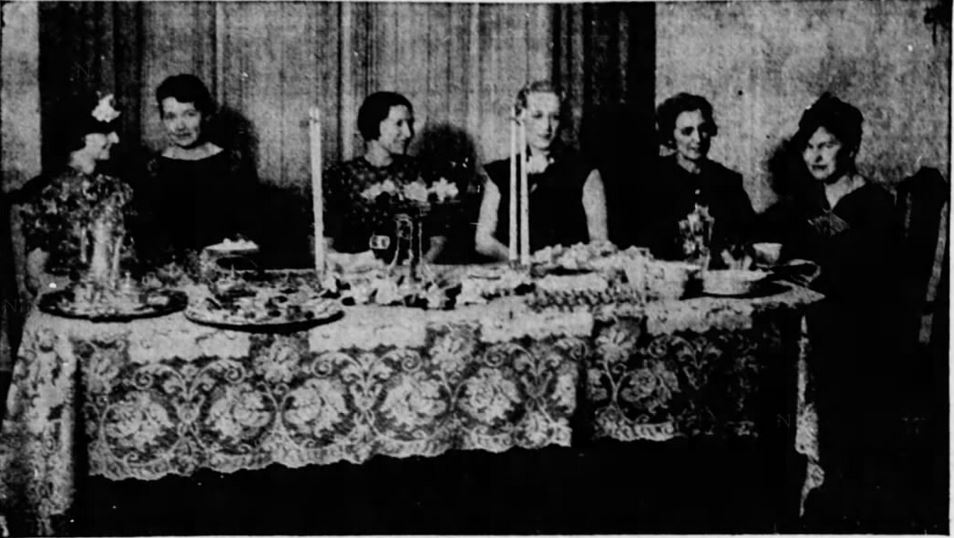
Members of Klamath Falls A.A.U.W. Reception Committee. Tea table at the home of Wanda Brown Shaw on Pacific Terrace, where visiting Oregon representatives of the A.A.U.W. were entertained. From left to right, Mrs. Percy Murray, Mrs. C.A. Henderson, Mrs. Ted Black, Mrs. Louis Serruys, Mrs. Frank Jenkins and Mrs. G.A. Krause

Wanda Brown Shaw was active in club affairs.

She was teacher in Klamath Falls High School.

She was the president of the Klamath branch of the American Association of University Women.

She was a member of Delphian Society, Daughters of the American Revolution and the Klamath Falls Woman's Library Club.

== Personal life ==
Wanda Brown married James Royal Shaw and they had two children: James "Jimmie" Royal Jr. and Wanda Elizabeth. She lived at 805 Pacific Terrace, Klamath Falls, Oregon.

She died on July 20, 1942, and is buried at Fortmiller mortuary, Albany, in the Shaw family plot.
