= Rachel Applegate Solomon =

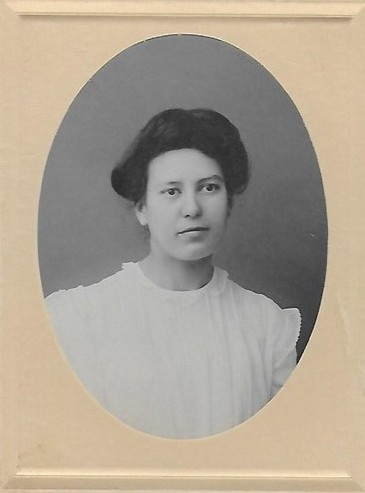
Rachel Applegate Solomon, 1908

Rachel Emma Applegate Solomon (November 23, 1887 - June 15, 1955) was an American educator.

== Early life ==
Rachel Emma Applegate was born in Lone Rock Ranch, Klamath County, Oregon, on November 23, 1887, the daughter of Capt. Oliver Cromwell Applegate (1845–1938) and Florence Ella Anderson (1855-1919). Her father was a pioneer and staunch friend of the Indians. Her grandfather, Rev. Jesse Marion Anderson, was a pioneer Methodist minister, who was widely known in southern Oregon as a man of ability and worth. She had 5 siblings: Frank Lindsay Applegate (1879-1964), Annie Elizabeth Halferty (1881-1935), Leroy Gilbert Applegate (1885-1966), Jean Margaret Applegate (1894-1956), Oliver Cromwell Applegate (1896-1994).

She graduated from Klamath County High School and taught one year before entering the University of Oregon to complete her education.

== Career ==
Rachel Applegate Solomon was a Latin teacher for 25 years, first in Klamath County High School and later in Klamath Union High School; she was very active in church work.

She held office in several clubs and fraternal organizations. She was a leader of the Delphian Society, a national organization that promoted the education of women in the United States. As a member of the Daughters of the American Revolution, she placed commemorative markers on Denny Creek located on Rock Creek and on Oregon's first battlefield of the Modoc War: her father Captain O.C. Applegate, Rachel and Bert C. Thomas motored to the historic spots. She was one of the first members of the Schoolmates Club.

She wrote a history of Klamath County, published in 1941.

She was a member of: American Association of University Women, Klamath Falls Library Club, Women's Library Club, Women's Auxiliary, Sisterhood Circle of the First Methodist church, Pioneer School Girls.

== Personal life ==
Rachel Applegate Solomon lived at 426 N. 7th St., Klamath Falls, Oregon.

On July 29, 1920, she married Claude E. Solomon. She remarried on January 1, 1929, to David Jay Good (1872-1939). She married for the third time to John George Swan (1875-1951), the former superintendent of Klamath County Schools. She died on June 15, 1955, and is buried at Rest Lawn Memorial Park, Junction City.
