= Applegate River =

River in Oregon, United States of America

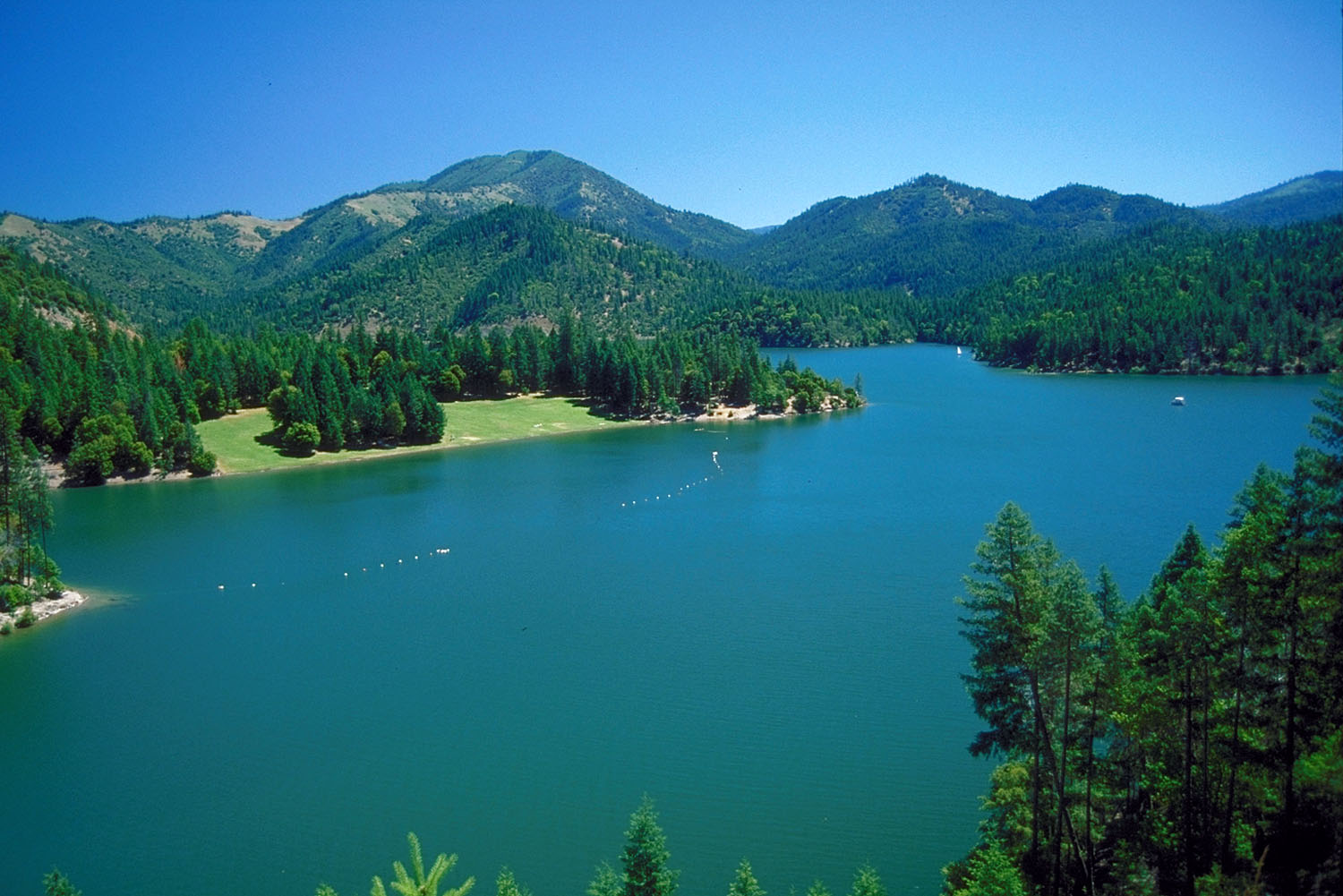
- Applegate Lake on the Applegate River

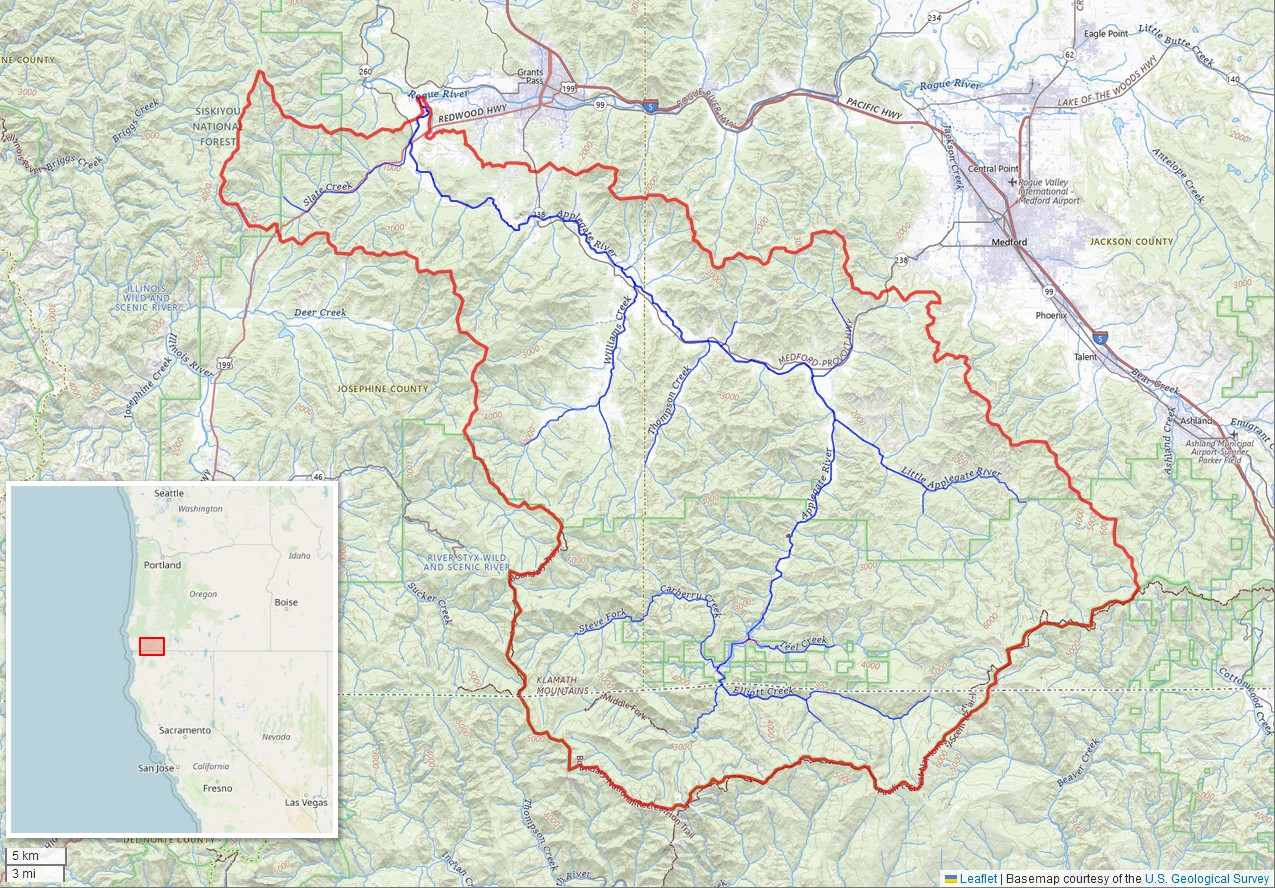
- Applegate River watershed (Interactive map)
- Etymology: Named after Lindsay Applegate, part of a group that prospected along the river in 1848

Location
- Country: United States
- State: Oregon, California
- County: Siskiyou in California, Jackson and Josephine in Oregon

Physical characteristics
- Source: Confluence of Butte Fork Applegate River and Middle Fork Applegate River
  - location: Siskiyou Mountains, Siskiyou County, California
  - coordinates: 41°58′23″N 123°11′08″W
  - elevation: 2,534 ft (772 m)
- Mouth: Rogue River
  - location: about 6 miles (10 km) west of Grants Pass, Josephine County, Oregon
  - coordinates: 42°25′44″N 123°26′59″W
  - elevation: 850 ft (260 m)
- Length: 51 mi (82 km)
- Basin size: 698 mi^{2} (1,810 km^{2})
- Discharge
  - location: near Wilderville, 7.6 miles (12.2 km) from the mouth
  - average: 720 cu ft/s (20 m^{3}/s)
  - minimum: 0.78 cu ft/s (0.022 m^{3}/s)
  - maximum: 47,500 cu ft/s (1,350 m^{3}/s)

The Applegate River is a 51-mile (82 km)-long tributary of the Rogue River in the U.S. state of Oregon. It drains approximately 698 square miles (1,810 km^{2}). Rising in northern California, it soon crosses the border and flows northeast then northwest to meet the Rogue about 6 miles (9.7 km) west of Grants Pass. It drains forested foothills of the Siskiyou Mountains along the Oregon–California border.

== Course ==
The Applegate River's headwaters are located in the Siskiyou Mountains in California, part of the Rogue River–Siskiyou National Forest. The water collects from snowmelt and springs. The Siskiyou area receives from 17 to 40 inches (430 to 1,020 mm) of precipitation annually. The river then flows north through a steep canyon past the Oregon-California border, receiving water from Elliot Creek. Elliot Creek begins near Dutchman Peak in Oregon, before flowing southwest into California, roughly paralleling the border. It joins the Applegate just before it enters Oregon. This area saw major floods in 1964 and 1974, before the Applegate Dam was constructed.

The river is impounded by Applegate Dam several miles into Oregon, forming the 988-acre (4.00 km^{2}) Applegate Lake. The United States Army Corps of Engineers began construction of the dam in 1974, and it was completed in 1980. The lake nearly extends to California. The purpose of the lake is to provide irrigation and flood control for the Applegate Valley. The community of Copper was inundated by the rising waters of the lake, and is now over 100 feet (30 m) below lake level.

From Applegate Dam, the river flows north and slightly eastwards. About 8 miles (13 km) from California, it flows under the McKee Bridge. The covered bridge was built in 1917 for miners and loggers. It was closed in 1956, deemed unsafe for motor vehicles. Restored in 1965 and 1985, the bridge is now open for pedestrians.

Several miles past McKee Bridge is the confluence with the Little Applegate River. Near Ruch, the Applegate turns and flows northwest through the unincorporated communities of Applegate and Provolt. Near Provolt it passes from Jackson County to Josephine County. Tributaries in this area include Thompson Creek and Williams Creek, and both flow north. Williams Creek was named after Captain Robert Williams, who fought the Rogue River Indians along the creek during the Rogue River Wars. It flows through Williams, also named for the captain.

From Williams Creek the Applegate turns west and flows through Murphy. It then turns north through Wilderville.

The river empties into the Rogue River 6 miles (9.7 km) west of Grants Pass, just above the start of the Wild and Scenic section of the Rogue. It discharges an average of 720 cubic feet per second (20 m^{3}/s), however as high as 47,500 cubic feet per second (1,350 m^{3}/s) was recorded in 1953, and as low as 0.78 cubic feet per second (0.022 m^{3}/s) was recorded in 1979, when Applegate Lake was being filled.

== Watershed ==
The Applegate River drains approximately 698 square miles (1,810 km^{2}). Approximately 35 percent of the watershed is owned by the United States Forest Service (as part of the Rogue River–Siskiyou National Forest), and another 35 percent by the Bureau of Land Management. Private property covers 20 percent, while the remaining 10 percent is commercial forests.

About 12,000 people live in the river's watershed in multiple towns and farms, although none of the towns are incorporated.

== Flora and fauna ==
The most common trees within the Applegate River's watershed include Douglas fir and madrone. Oregon white oak and big-leaf maple grow in the loam soil found on the higher slopes. Shrubs such as vine maple and manzanita grow beneath the trees.

Animals that live along the Applegate River include the endangered Siskiyou Mountains salamander, and the near threatened spotted owl.

== See also ==
- List of rivers of Oregon
- List of longest streams of Oregon
- Northern California
- Southern Oregon
