= Ben Simons (politician) =

American politician (born 2000)

Mayor of Yoncalla
- In office January 1, 2019 – January 1, 2021
- Preceded by: Gerald Cross
- Succeeded by: Stacey Atwell-Keister

Personal details
- Born: Benjamin Simons; January 23, 2000 (age 26) Yoncalla, Oregon, U.S.
- Party: Republican
- Occupation: Politician · firefighter

Ben Simons (born January 23, 2000) is an American politician who served as the mayor of Yoncalla, Oregon from 2019 to 2021. He was elected at age 18, the youngest person to assume the office. As mayor, he has led improvement of the town's wastewater system, reopened the town library that had been closed due to budget cuts in 2017, and completed projects to improve the town's roads.

== Early life and education ==
Simons was born in 2000 in Yoncalla, Oregon, a town with a population of about 1,000. The Yoncalla High School Class of 2018 valedictorian, Simons also was a member of Future Business Leaders of America. He sat on a student committee of the town's school board, and served two years as school president.

He has attended Umpqua Community College full-time, to complete an associate degree in spring 2020. As of 2020, he planned to transfer to the University of Oregon to earn a degree in business administration.

== Politics ==
When Simons was in eighth grade he attended school board meetings with his mother. An audit of the Yoncalla High School building (built in 1949) revealed urgently neededed structural improvements, but the town had no funds for the repairs, and two school bond measures did not pass. By the time he was in tenth grade, Simons was on a planning committee to set priorities for the recommended improvements if the district could find the funds. The school did receive a state grant for seismic improvements which also funded other building repairs. From that experience, Simons said he learned that in tight budgets, "Prioritizing can be everything."

In August 2018, Simons was appointed to the city council of Yoncalla, replacing a councilor who left for health reasons. Shortly thereafter, Simons filed for the mayor's race.

"My history teachers in school are to blame for this. They were the ones who really encouraged participation in what's going on. They really emphasized how the 18-to-24-year-old demographic has such low voter turnout. They encouraged us to be the change in that."

— Ben Simons

In November 2018, Simons, a self-identified Republican, was elected mayor, receiving 41% of the 359 ballots cast, defeating two other candidates who had filed, as well as others on seven write-in ballots. The Seattle Times reported, "News of Simons' win sparked a wave of stories and interviews from Roseburg to the United Kingdom."

His two-year mayoral term started in January 2019.

As mayor, Simons has met challenges such as turnover in city councilors, and the February 2019 "snowmageddon" storm. Simons also spearheaded a town waste water project and improved roads. In addition, Simons led an effort that reopened the town's library, which had been closed since failed Douglas County tax initiatives in 2017 caused libraries to close. He said his goals for the town in January 2020 included improving drinking water in Yoncalla, and continuing to work on the town's infrastructure.

While serving as mayor, Simons has also actively served as a volunteer firefighter.
