= Lindsay Applegate =

American pioneer (1808–1892)

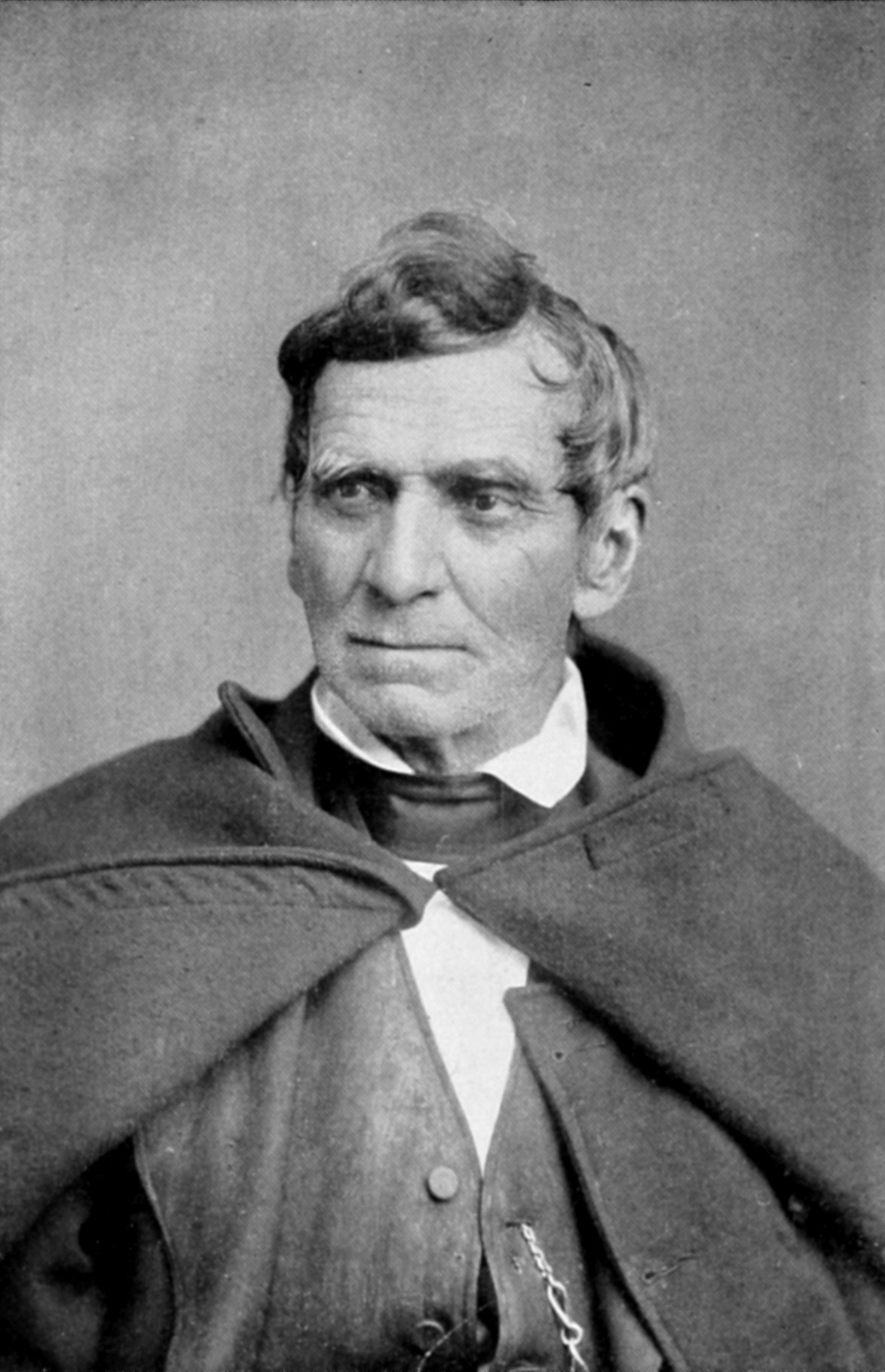

Member of the Oregon House of Representatives
- In office 1862–1863
- Constituency: Jackson County

Personal details
- Born: September 18, 1808 Kentucky
- Died: November 28, 1892 (aged 84) Klamath Falls, Oregon
- Party: Republican
- Spouse: Elizabeth Miller
- Occupation: Indian agent

Lindsay Applegate (September 18, 1808 – November 28, 1892) was an American pioneer known for his participation in blazing the Applegate Trail, an alternative route of the Oregon Trail. The trail was blazed with his brothers Charles and Jesse in 1846, though Charles was not a member of the party that blazed the section of the Applegate Trail from the Willamette Valley to the Humboldt River. According to an original manuscript written by Lindsay Applegate in 1877, the members of the expedition were: Capt. Levi Scott, John Scott (son of Levi), Henry Boygus, Lindsay Applegate, Jesse Applegate, Benjamin Burch, John Owens, John Jones, Robert Smith, Samuel Goodhue, Moses "Black" Harris, David Goff, Benit Osburn, William Sportsman, and William Parker.

== Early life ==
Lindsay Applegate was born to Daniel and Rachel Applegate in Kentucky on September 18, 1808. The family moved to the Osage Valley in Missouri in 1820, where they farmed. In 1831, Lindsay married Elizabeth Miller, whose sister Melinda was married to Lindsay's older brother Charles, and they had twelve children. He fought in the Black Hawk War against Native Americans in 1832.

== Oregon Country ==
In 1843, Lindsay and Charles traveled with their younger brother Jesse to the Oregon Country, after they all sold their farms in Missouri, bought several hundred head of cattle and set out at the behest of Jesse's good friend, Robert Shortess. At that time, the Oregon Trail was still in its infancy, and the final hundred or so miles beyond the Wascopam Mission had to be traveled by boat through dangerous winds, rapids, and eddies on the Columbia River:

Whirlpools looking like deep basins in the river, the lapping, splashing, and rolling of waves ... Presently there was a wail of anguish, a shriek, and a scene of confusion in our boat that no language can describe. The boat we were watching disappeared and we saw the man and boys struggling in the water.

Lindsay's nine-year-old son Warren perished, as did Jesse's ten-year-old son Edward, who did not know how to swim. Lindsay wrote, "We resolved if we remained in the country, to find a better way for others who might wish to emigrate." Additional fatalities in the 1844 and 1845 immigration seasons further stirred up settlers and inspired many to search for alternate routes.

Lindsay and fourteen other settlers established the South Emigrant Trail between Fort Hall in Idaho and the Willamette Valley in Oregon via northern Nevada and then through southern Oregon, where Ashland and Roseburg now lie. The intents of this route were to be safer than the Columbia River, encourage settlers to western Oregon, avoid the area controlled by the Hudson's Bay Company, and steer clear of the disputed British territory north of the Columbia, which most settlers expected would soon become the U.S.–British Columbia border.

=== Applegate Trail ===
Jesse obtained information from the HBC about the California Trail which led from Idaho to northern California along the Humboldt River. This, combined with knowledge of the trapper's trail between the Willamette Valley and California, led fifteen men on horseback to set out in mid-June 1846 to look for a link between the two trails, with the expedition blessed by the Provisional Government of Oregon.

They traveled due south through the Willamette, Umpqua, and Rogue valleys. At the south end of the Rogue Valley—the site of present-day Ashland—they turned east and crossed the Cascade Range, approximately following the present-day route of Green Springs Highway, Oregon Route 66, and emerged near where Keno, Oregon now lies. They went around the south end of Klamath Lake and eventually to the future site of Winnemucca, Nevada. The party then split, leaving some to rest, while the remainder followed the Humboldt River northeast and along the California Trail to Fort Hall. The first emigrants to use the Applegate Trail did so in the fall of 1846 by following the Applegate party on the return trip, a group of perhaps 150 families which were persuaded by Jesse.

Upon their return, the combined party began to blaze a trail for wagons, though they were ill-prepared for such an effort, having few tools, and consisting of mostly weary emigrants. They also faced an early winter—one which set snowfall records and stranded the Donner Party in the Sierra Nevada, a few hundred miles to the south.

By the time they arrived in the Rogue Valley, winter had set in. Rain, snow, mud, swollen creeks and rivers hampered passage. Low supplies, scarce game, dense brush and trees, and difficulty lighting warming fires slowed progress considerably, separating the emigrants over many miles. They were spared by relief parties from the Willamette Valley when news of their trouble traveled along the trail.

The Applegates were blamed for the hardships the first wagon train faced by Jesse Quinn Thornton, who waged a war of words which nearly led to a duel between him and an Applegate supporter, James Nesmith. Remnants of the hostility survive today among some descendants of those survivors. Though the Applegate Trail minimized natural dangers, aggressive Indian warriors took the lives of at least 300 emigrants by 1862, even though the trail fell into general disuse by 1847.

Lindsay Applegate and his party were the first white men in what is now the Lava Beds National Monument. While traveling eastward they were stopped by rough lava around the south end of Tule Lake. The feature known as Stone Bridge at the north end was the route of hundreds of emigrants.

== Later life ==
Lindsay made a donation land claim in Yoncalla (between Eugene and Roseburg) in 1846 and established a grist mill. As a carpenter, he had built the first river ferry in Polk County in 1844. He also owned the toll road through the Siskiyous, which he sold in the 1860s.

Lindsay was appointed special agent for the Modoc Indians in 1861. In 1862, he was elected to the Oregon House of Representatives as a Republican representing Jackson County. In 1865, he was appointed Indian subagent, responsible for treaty negotiations and other U.S. government dealings with the Klamath Indians.

Lindsay retired to Ashland in 1869. The Modoc War of 1872, between the Modocs and the U.S. Army, began shortly after he retired from his post. In January 1873, along with several other settlers, including Samuel Asahel Clark and R. H. Kincaid, Lindsay successfully proposed a peace commission to stop the war's spread.

Lindsay Applegate died on November 28, 1892, at the home of his son Oliver in Klamath County. He was survived by sons Elisha, Jesse A., Oliver, Ivan, and Lucien, and daughters Alice and Rachel. He had five other children who predeceased him: Warren (who drowned in the Columbia River), Theresa, Annie, Frank, and Jerome. His wife, Elizabeth, died in 1882.

Applegate wrote Notes and Reminiscences of Laying Out and Establishing the Old Emigrant Road into Southern Oregon in the Year 1846. He is the namesake of the Applegate River in Oregon.
