= Provolt, Oregon =

Unincorporated community in the state of Oregon, United States

- Unincorporated community
- Location within Oregon Location within the United States
- Coordinates: 42°17′14″N 123°13′49″W
- Country: United States
- State: Oregon
- County: Jackson
- Elevation: 1,181 ft (360 m)
- Time zone: UTC-8 (Pacific (PST))
  - Summer (DST): UTC-7 (PDT)
- Area codes: 458 and 541
- GNIS feature ID: 1125682
- Coordinates and elevation from Geographic Names Information System

Provolt (/ˈproʊvoʊlt/ PROH-vohlt) is an unincorporated community in Jackson County, Oregon, United States. It is about 15 miles (24 km) southeast of Grants Pass on Oregon Route 238, near the Applegate River on the county line between Jackson and Josephine counties.

Provolt post office was named for a pioneer family of the area. The Provolt Store was started about 1875 by Samuel Provolt. The post office was established in 1895 in what was then Josephine County; Mary E. Provolt was the first postmaster. The office was discontinued in 1955.

According to author Ralph Friedman, Provolt's entire business district consists of the historic country store. Provolt, however, also has a grange hall one block south of the store.

== Climate ==
Climate data for Provolt, Oregon
Month	Jan	Feb	Mar	Apr	May	Jun	Jul	Aug	Sep	Oct	Nov	Dec	Year
Mean daily maximum °F (°C)	48.6 (9.2)	53.8 (12.1)	58.8 (14.9)	64.8 (18.2)	72.4 (22.4)	80.1 (26.7)	89.3 (31.8)	88.9 (31.6)	82.3 (27.9)	69.5 (20.8)	54.1 (12.3)	46.2 (7.9)	67.4 (19.7)
Mean daily minimum °F (°C)	31.0 (−0.6)	31.0 (−0.6)	33.0 (0.6)	36.1 (2.3)	40.8 (4.9)	45.3 (7.4)	49.7 (9.8)	48.5 (9.2)	43.0 (6.1)	36.7 (2.6)	33.9 (1.1)	30.9 (−0.6)	38.3 (3.5)
Average precipitation inches (mm)	5.29 (134)	4.03 (102)	3.65 (93)	2.13 (54)	1.35 (34)	0.73 (19)	0.26 (6.6)	0.26 (6.6)	0.61 (15)	2.04 (52)	4.75 (121)	6.67 (169)	31.77 (806.2)
Average snowfall inches (cm)	2.4 (6.1)	2.1 (5.3)	0.8 (2.0)	0.1 (0.25)	0.0 (0.0)	0.0 (0.0)	0.0 (0.0)	0.0 (0.0)	0.0 (0.0)	0.0 (0.0)	0.5 (1.3)	1.6 (4.1)	7.5 (19.05)
Source: NOAA
