= Hal Turpin =

American baseball pitcher (1903–1997)

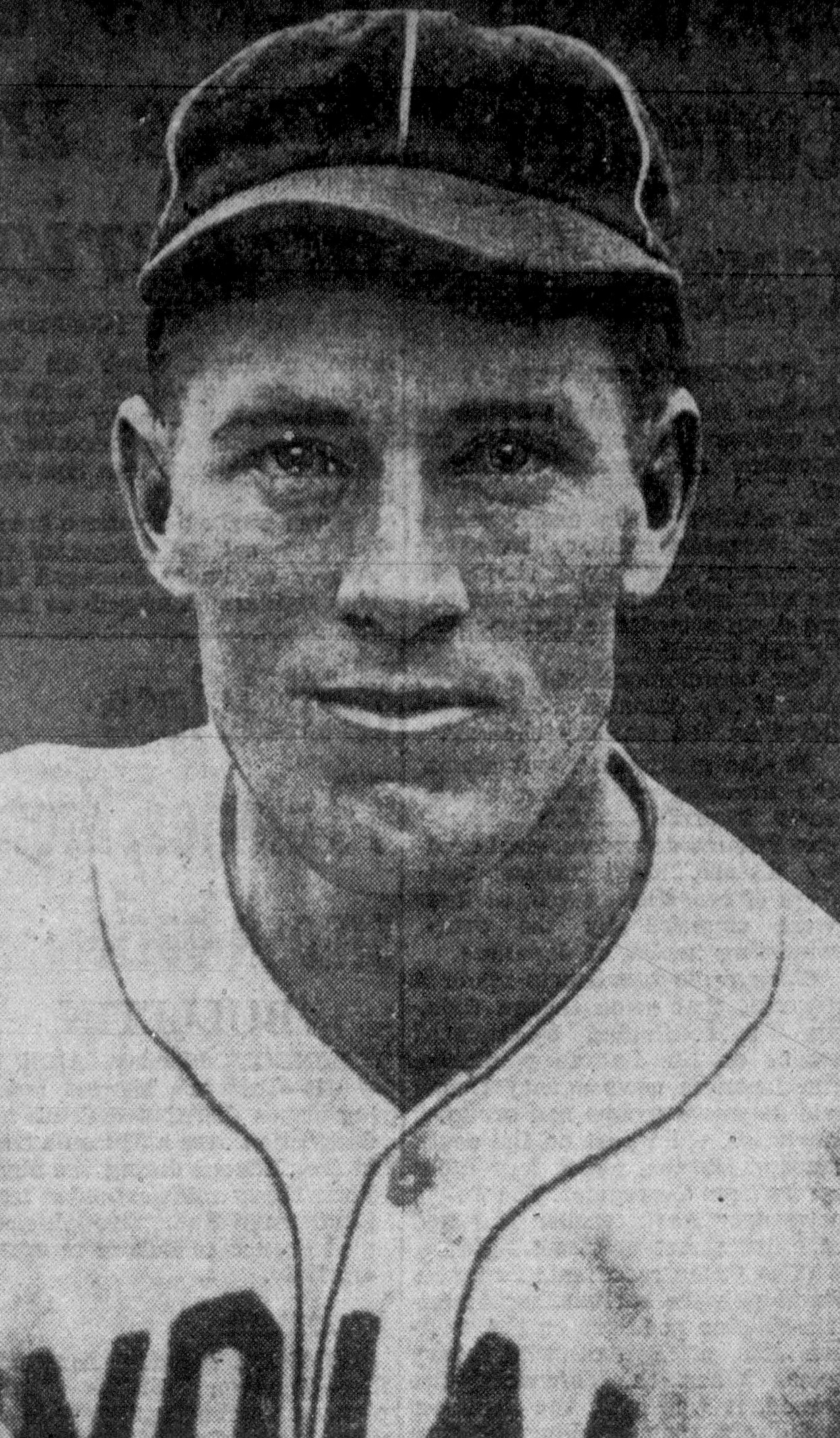
Turpin, circa 1942

Harold Turpin (September 28, 1903 – February 28, 1997) was an American baseball pitcher who played 20 season in minor league baseball, including 18 in the Pacific Coast League. He won 271 games in his career and is a member of the Pacific Coast League Hall of Fame. He threw right-handed, batted left-handed, was 5' 11" and weighed 185 pounds.

The hurler was born in Yoncalla, Oregon. He began his career with the San Francisco Seals in 1927 and would also play for them from 1929 to 1931. In 1928 and the first part of 1929, he played for the Little Rock Travelers of the Southern Association. In 1931 and 1932, he played for the Seattle Indians, with whom he would spend the most seasons—he was also with Seattle from 1937 to 1945. In total, he spent about 10.5 seasons with Seattle. He also played for the Denver Bears of the Western Association (1932), the PCL's Portland Beavers (1933-1935), the Western League's Des Moines Demons (1935-1936) and the PCL's Sacramento Solons (1946).

He won 20 games for the first time in 1936 at age 32, beginning a run in which he won 20 or more games in five of seven seasons. From 1939 to 1942, he won 20-plus games each season and from 1938 to 1943, his ERA never exceeded 3.00.

He played his final game in 1946 at age 42. Overall, he went 271–203, including a 203–158 mark in the Pacific Coast League. He also had 249 complete games and 29 shutouts in the PCL, along with a no-hitter he threw in 1942 (he also tossed a no-hitter with Des Moines in 1935). He hit well for a pitcher, often batting over .200. He was inducted into the PCL Hall of Fame in 2003.

He died in Roseburg, Oregon at age 93.
