= Applegate Lake =

Reservoir in Jackson County, Oregon, USA

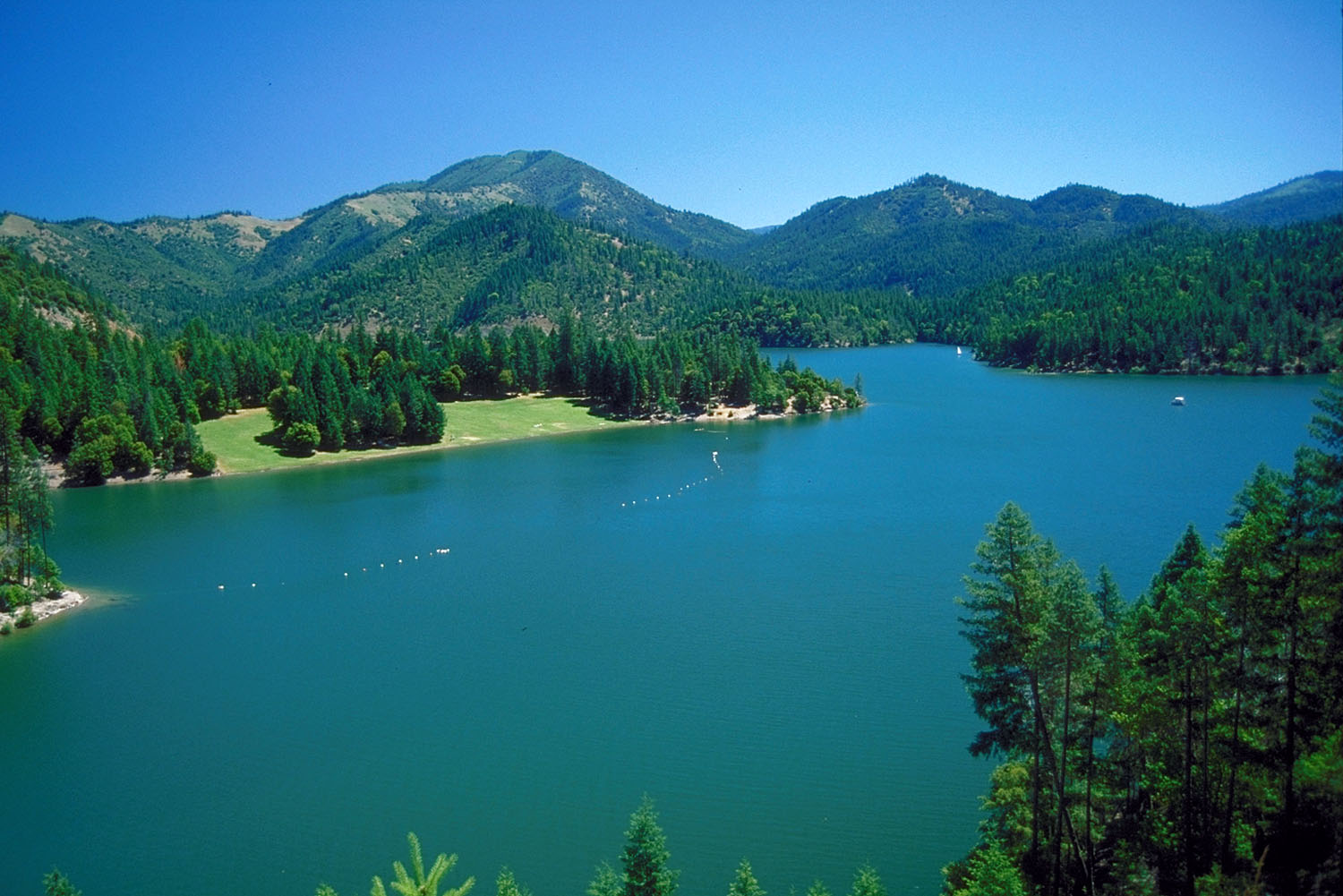
- Applegate Lake

- Location of Applegate Lake in Oregon, USA. Applegate Lake (the United States)
- Location: Jackson County, Oregon
- Coordinates: 42°03′17″N 123°06′52″W
- Type: reservoir, mesotrophic
- Primary inflows: Applegate River
- Primary outflows: Applegate River
- Catchment area: 223 square miles (580 km^{2})
- Basin countries: United States
- Surface area: 988 acres (4.00 km^{2})
- Average depth: 83 feet (25 m)
- Max. depth: 225 ft (69 m)
- Water volume: 82,200 acre-feet (101,400,000 m^{3})
- Residence time: 7 months
- Shore length^{1}: 18.5 miles (29.8 km)
- Surface elevation: 1,985 ft (605 m)
- ^{1} Shore length is not a well-defined measure.

Applegate Lake is a 988-acre (400 ha) reservoir located in the Rogue River–Siskiyou National Forest about 27 miles (43 km) southwest of Medford in the U.S. state of Oregon. It is 16 miles (26 km) south of Oregon Route 238 along Applegate River Road and slightly north of the Oregon–California border. The lake is an impoundment of the Applegate River about 46 miles (74 km) from its confluence with the Rogue River.

== History ==
The United States Congress authorized construction of the Applegate Dam in 1962 as part of a flood-control project. In 1976, the Corps of Engineers began work on the dam, which was finished in 1980 at a final cost of $96 million. In addition to controlling floods, the dam was intended to store water for irrigation and recreation.

Applegate Dam, 1,300 feet (400 m) long and 242 feet (74 m) high, created a lake stretching 4.6 miles (7.4 km) upstream. As the reservoir filled with water, it inundated the remnants of Copper, a community that had once had a post office and a few buildings. Since then, when water levels in the lake fall sufficiently, the highway that formerly ended at Copper reappears at the south (upstream) end of the lake and serves as the lower end of a boat ramp. Over 5,000 ounces of gold were recovered in the final two years of construction and proceeds were split between the federal government and two engineering firms involved.

Applegate Lake holds up to 82,200 acre-feet (101,400,000 m^{3}) of water. It and Lost Creek Lake, on the main stem of the Rogue River, are the only large multi-purpose Corps of Engineers reservoirs in the Rogue River basin.

The lake, the dam, and other entities in this region were named for Lindsay Applegate. In 1848, he led a party of settlers through the Rogue River Valley on the way to mines in California.

== Recreation ==
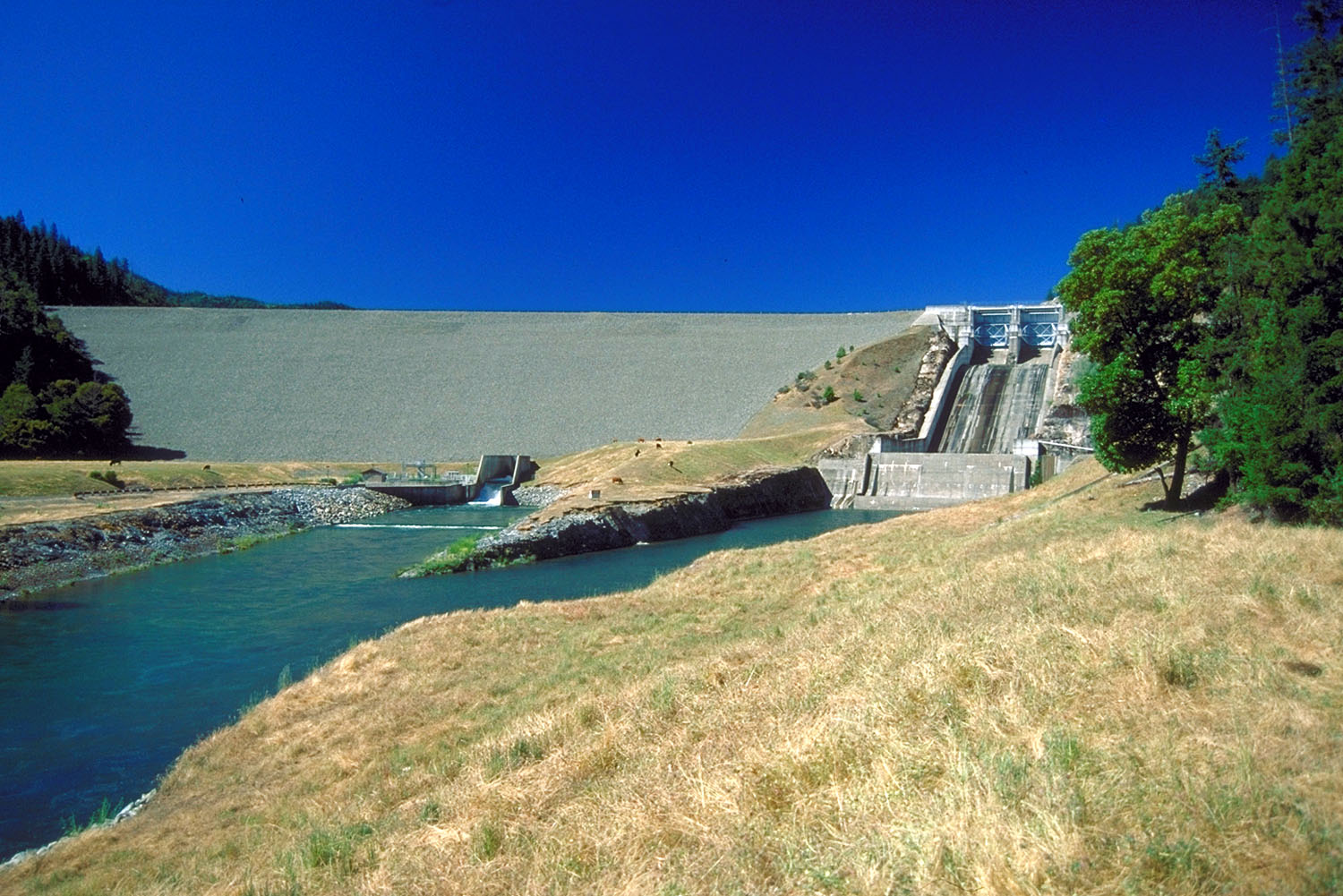
Applegate Dam

Applegate Lake has large populations of trout, landlocked Chinook salmon, smallmouth bass, largemouth bass, and crappie. It is stocked each year with about 120,000 rainbow trout and about 50,000 young Chinook. Ramps, including two that are open year-round, provide access for boats. About 18 miles (29 km) of trails circle the reservoir.

The United States Forest Service maintains campgrounds as well as places along the shore for fishing, picnicking, and swimming as well as boating. Mountain biking is allowed on one of the trails, and horses are allowed on three.

== See also ==
- List of lakes in Oregon

Media related to Applegate Lake at Wikimedia Commons
