= Jane Denio Hutchison =

American clubwoman

Jane Denio Smith Hutchinson (May 23, 1871 - January 29, 1942) was the president of the Tri County Federation of Women's Clubs.

== Early life ==
Jane Denio Smith was born in Vallejo, California, on May 23, 1871, the daughter of J. Duncan Smith and Janette Weir.

She graduated from San Jose State Teacher's College.

== Career ==
Jane Denio Hutchinson was active in Woman's Clubs and civic affairs.

She was the president of Tri County Federation of Women's Clubs and auditor of the Northern District Federation of Women's Clubs.

She was a member of the Vallejo School Department and of the advisory Board for Sacramento District of California Public Safety Conference.

She was a member of the Nevada City Woman's Civic Club, Nevada County Delphian Chapter, Order of the Eastern Star.

== Personal life ==
Jane Denio Hutchinson moved to California in 1898 and lived at 216 Nevada St., Nevada City, California. She married James Hamilton Hutchison (1869-1958) and had one son, David R. Hutchison.

She died on January 29, 1942, and is buried at Sunrise Memorial Cemetery, Vallejo, California.
