= Joseph Schafer =

American historian (1867–1941)

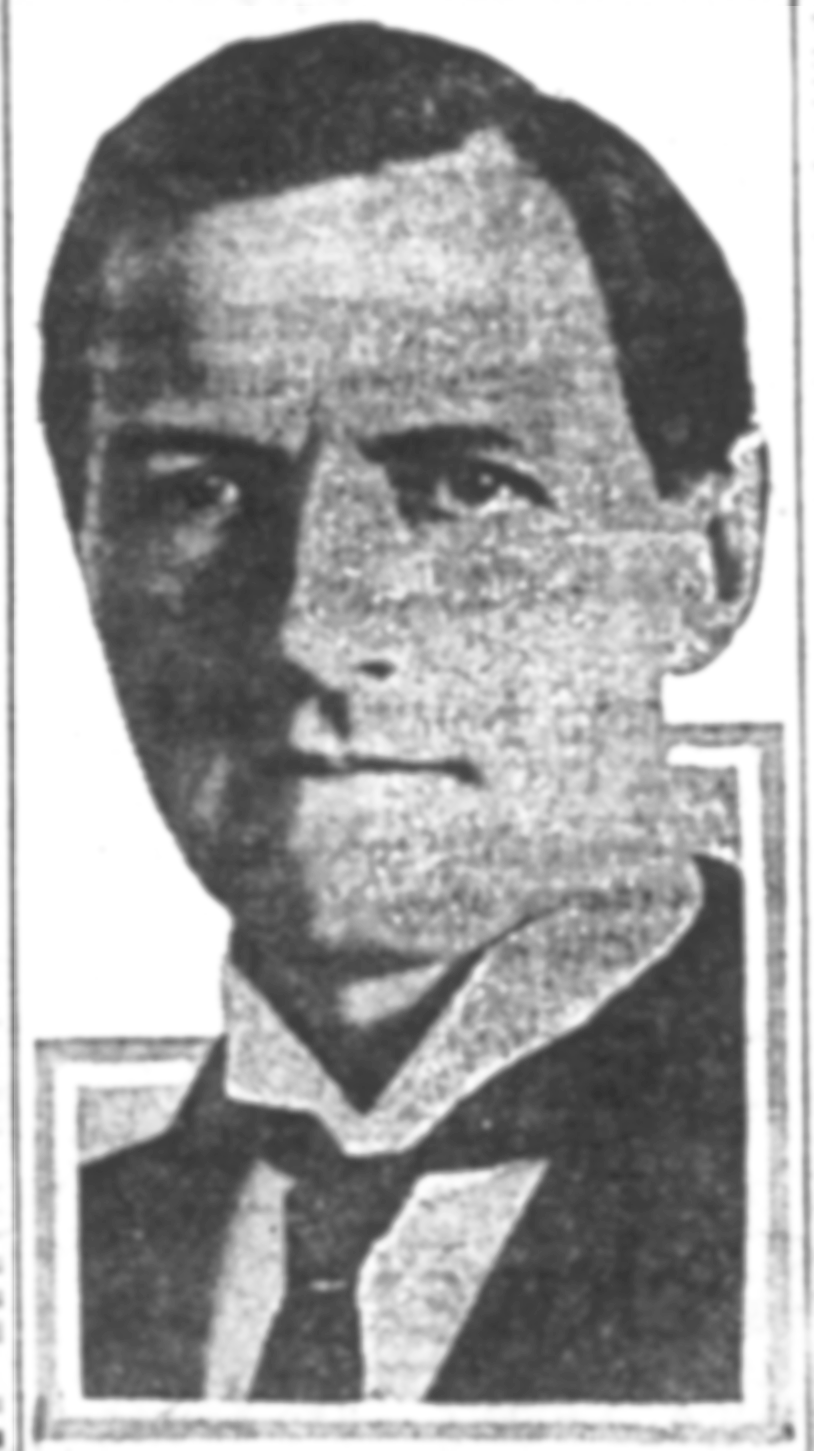
Joseph Schafer

Joseph Schafer (1867–1941) was the first academically trained historian in the U.S. state of Oregon. He studied with Frederick Jackson Turner, and chaired the history department at the University of Oregon from 1900 to 1920. He authored A History of the Pacific Northwest in 1905 and revised it in 1918; the book was considered the standard history of the region into the 1950s.
