= Buncombe (surname) =

Buncombe is a surname. Notable people with the surname include:

- Alex Buncombe (born 1981), British racing driver
- Chris Buncombe (born 1978), British racing driver
- Edward Buncombe (1742–1778), American plantation owner
