= Sterlingville, Oregon =

- Unincorporated community
- Location within Oregon Location within the United States
- Coordinates: 42°13′29″N 122°56′34″W
- Country: United States
- State: Oregon
- County: Jackson
- Elevation: 2,726 ft (831 m)
- Time zone: UTC-8 (Pacific (PST))
  - Summer (DST): UTC-7 (PDT)
- GNIS feature ID: 1165994
- Coordinates and elevation from Geographic Names Information System

Sterlingville was a boomtown along Sterling Creek in Jackson County, Oregon, United States, once home to the largest hydraulic mine in Oregon. It has since been abandoned and destroyed.

== History ==
Sterlingville was founded in 1854 when two miners, one named James Sterling and the other named Aaron Davis, discovered gold in nearby Sterling Creek. Word leaked out that gold had been found, and within two years Sterlingville was home to over 800 people. Buildings in the town included general stores, a warehouse, boarding houses, a bakery, a casino, a dance hall, saloons, a blacksmith shop, a barber shop, and many houses. At its peak, Sterlingville had a population of over 1,500. The Sterlingville School District was created in 1869. In 1877, the newly founded Sterling Mine Company built the Sterling Ditch, diverting water 23 miles (37 km) from Little Applegate River for hydraulic mining of gold and chromite. Sterling Mine quickly became the largest hydraulic mine in Oregon, and possibly the entire western United States. As the source of Sterling Ditch was 120 feet (37 m) above the mine, it used gravity to propel water through three 5-inch (13 cm) nozzles. Captain A. P. Ankeny, owner of the Sterling Mine Company, collected over $64,000 from gold. The Sterlingville post office was built in 1879, but as the gold ran out, the population of the town declined. In 1883, the post office closed, by 1910, hydraulic mining had stopped, and in 1937, the school district closed down.

During the Great Depression, Sterlingville saw a revival of hydraulic mining. The mines operated from 1933 to 1957. The mines devastated the surrounding landscape, washing away nearly all the soil, and moving piles of rocks downstream. After the mines closed, the town was abandoned and destroyed.

== See also ==
- List of ghost towns in Oregon
