= Dutchman Peak =

Mountain in Oregon, United States

Coordinates: 42.0434722°N 122.8910648°W

Dutchman Peak is a summit in the U.S. state of Oregon. The elevation is 7,418 feet (2,261 m).

The word "Dutchman" does not refer to the Dutch people or Dutch language, but to the original German settlers.
