= Yoncalla, Oregon =

- City
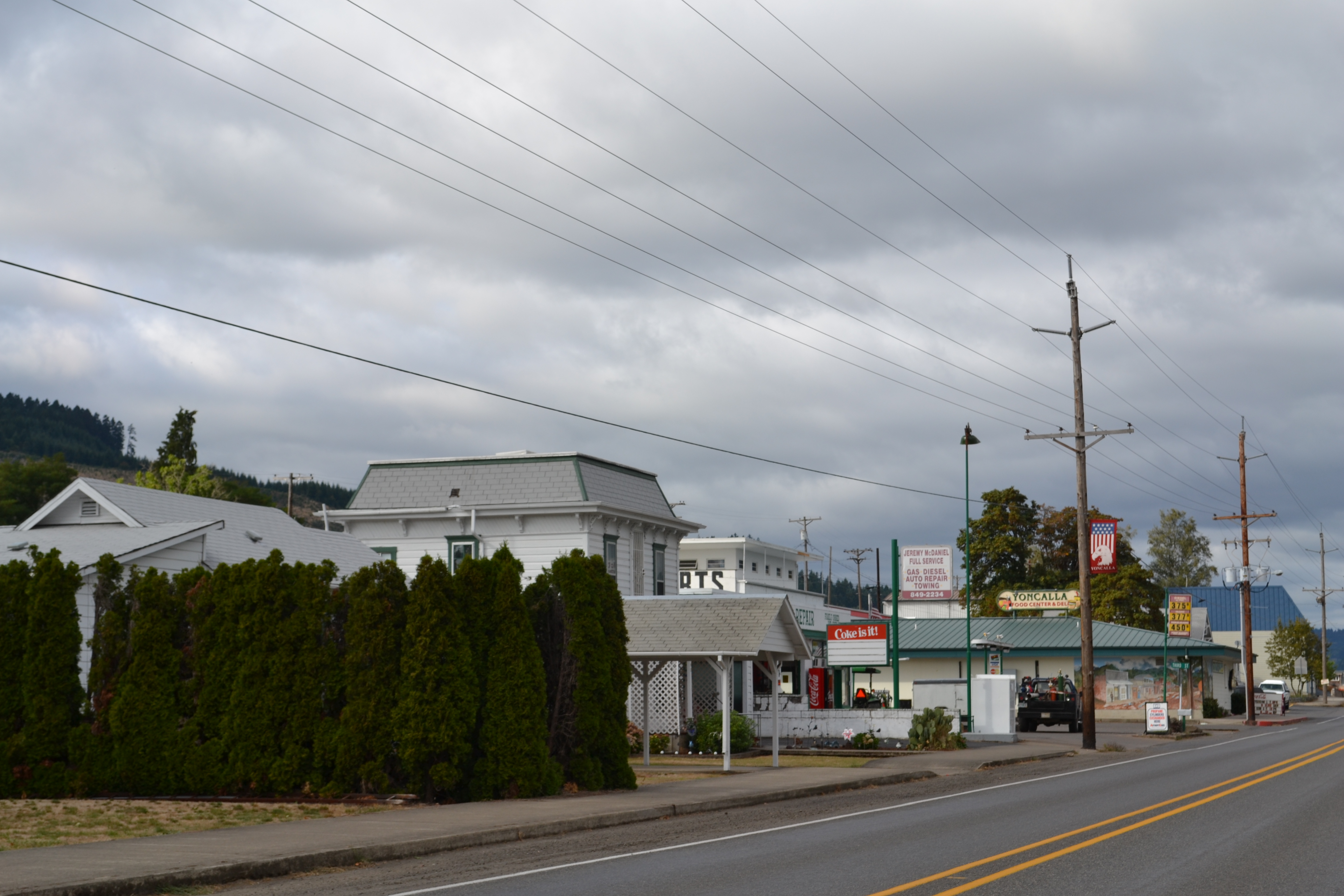
- Nickname: Home of the Eagles
- Location in Oregon
- Coordinates: 43°36′01″N 123°17′15″W
- Country: United States
- State: Oregon
- County: Douglas
- Incorporated: February 27, 1901

Government
  - Mayor: Stacey Atwell-Keister

Area
  - Total: 0.68 sq mi (1.76 km^{2})
  - Land: 0.67 sq mi (1.74 km^{2})
  - Water: 0.0077 sq mi (0.02 km^{2})
- Elevation: 390 ft (120 m)

Population (2020)
  - Total: 1,021
  - Density: 1,519.9/sq mi (586.83/km^{2})
- Time zone: UTC-8 (Pacific)
  - Summer (DST): UTC-7 (Pacific)
- ZIP code: 97499
- Area code: 541
- FIPS code: 41-84600
- GNIS feature ID: 2412320
- Website: www.cityofyoncalla.org

Yoncalla is a city in Douglas County, Oregon, United States. The population was 1,047 at the 2010 census.

== Geography ==
According to the United States Census Bureau, the city has a total area of 0.68 square miles (1.76 km^{2}), of which, 0.67 square miles (1.74 km^{2}) is land and 0.01 square miles (0.03 km^{2}) is water.

== History ==
Settlers first came to the area that would become Yoncalla in a covered wagon in the fall of 1848. Jesse Applegate arrived in 1849, and named the area after the Yoncalla-speaking Native Americans of the region.

In 1920 Yoncalla received attention for electing a female mayor and an all-female city council. Nearly a century later, in 2018, the city elected 18-year old Ben Simons mayor.

== Demographics ==
Historical population
Census	Pop.	Note	%±
1910	233		—
1920	232		−0.4%
1930	252		8.6%
1940	277		9.9%
1950	626		126.0%
1960	698		11.5%
1970	675		−3.3%
1980	805		19.3%
1990	919		14.2%
2000	1,052		14.5%
2010	1,047		−0.5%
2020	1,021		−2.5%
U.S. Decennial Census

=== 2020 census ===
As of the 2020 census, Yoncalla had a population of 1,021. The median age was 50.8 years. 19.7% of residents were under the age of 18 and 22.9% of residents were 65 years of age or older. For every 100 females there were 90.8 males, and for every 100 females age 18 and over there were 89.4 males age 18 and over.

0% of residents lived in urban areas, while 100.0% lived in rural areas.

There were 414 households in Yoncalla, of which 25.1% had children under the age of 18 living in them. Of all households, 42.8% were married-couple households, 21.3% were households with a male householder and no spouse or partner present, and 27.1% were households with a female householder and no spouse or partner present. About 31.4% of all households were made up of individuals and 15.9% had someone living alone who was 65 years of age or older.

There were 467 housing units, of which 11.3% were vacant. Among occupied housing units, 77.8% were owner-occupied and 22.2% were renter-occupied. The homeowner vacancy rate was 2.3% and the rental vacancy rate was 8.7%.

Racial composition as of the 2020 census
Race	Number	Percent
White	885	86.7%
Black or African American	0	0%
American Indian and Alaska Native	12	1.2%
Asian	8	0.8%
Native Hawaiian and Other Pacific Islander	1	0.1%
Some other race	6	0.6%
Two or more races	109	10.7%
Hispanic or Latino (of any race)	50	4.9%

=== 2010 census ===
As of the census of 2010, there were 1,047 people, 441 households, and 292 families living in the city. The population density was 1,562.7 inhabitants per square mile (603.4/km^{2}). There were 476 housing units at an average density of 710.4 per square mile (274.3/km^{2}). The racial makeup of the city was 92.3% White, 1.7% Native American, 0.5% Asian, 0.2% Pacific Islander, 1.7% from other races, and 3.6% from two or more races. Hispanic or Latino of any race were 4.6% of the population.

There were 441 households, of which 28.1% had children under the age of 18 living with them, 47.8% were married couples living together, 12.2% had a female householder with no husband present, 6.1% had a male householder with no wife present, and 33.8% were non-families. 27.2% of all households were made up of individuals, and 14.3% had someone living alone who was 65 years of age or older. The average household size was 2.37 and the average family size was 2.82.

The median age in the city was 46.8 years. 21.1% of residents were under the age of 18; 5.9% were between the ages of 18 and 24; 20.8% were from 25 to 44; 32.2% were from 45 to 64; and 20.1% were 65 years of age or older. The gender makeup of the city was 46.7% male and 53.3% female.

=== 2000 census ===
As of the census of 2000, there were 1,052 people, 409 households, and 287 families living in the city. The population density was 1,728.1 inhabitants per square mile (667.2/km^{2}). There were 437 housing units at an average density of 717.8 per square mile (277.1/km^{2}). The racial makeup of the city was 93.92% White, 0.48% Native American, 0.48% Asian, 0.57% Pacific Islander, 1.33% from other races, and 3.23% from two or more races. Hispanic or Latino of any race were 1.90% of the population.

There were 409 households, out of which 32.5% had children under the age of 18 living with them, 54.5% were married couples living together, 11.7% had a female householder with no husband present, and 29.8% were non-families. 23.5% of all households were made up of individuals, and 11.2% had someone living alone who was 65 years of age or older. The average household size was 2.56 and the average family size was 3.00.

In the city, the population was spread out, with 26.5% under the age of 18, 7.7% from 18 to 24, 26.0% from 25 to 44, 23.6% from 45 to 64, and 16.3% who were 65 years of age or older. The median age was 38 years. For every 100 females, there were 96.3 males. For every 100 females age 18 and over, there were 93.7 males.

The median income for a household in the city was $26,625, and the median income for a family was $31,250. Males had a median income of $26,806 versus $19,412 for females. The per capita income for the city was $13,756. About 13.3% of families and 18.3% of the population were below the poverty line, including 25.4% of those under age 18 and 17.3% of those age 65 or over.

== Notable people ==
- Jesse Applegate, pioneer who died in Yoncalla in 1888
- Rex Applegate, military officer and author
- Rocky Gale, baseball player, catcher for San Diego Padres
- Marilyn Kittelman, politician and businesswoman
- Ben Simons, mayor of Yoncalla (2019-2021)
- Hal Turpin, baseball player, member of Pacific Coast League Hall of Fame
