= Buncom, Oregon =

Unincorporated community in the state of Oregon, United States

- Unincorporated community
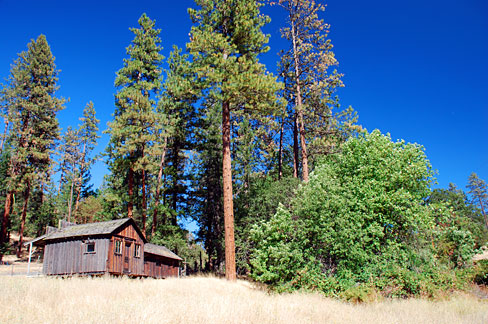
- Back view of Buncom's post office and bunkhouse

- Location within Oregon Location within the United States
- Coordinates: 42°10′26″N 122°59′53″W
- Country: United States
- State: Oregon
- County: Jackson
- Elevation: 1,783 ft (543 m)
- Time zone: UTC-8 (Pacific (PST))
  - Summer (DST): UTC-7 (PDT)
- ZIP code: 97530
- Area codes: 458 and 541
- GNIS feature ID: 1138957

Buncom (also spelled Bunkum or Buncombe) is an abandoned mining town at the confluence of the Little Applegate River and Sterling Creek in Jackson County, Oregon, United States. It is approximately 20 miles (32 km) southwest of Medford, at an elevation of 1,783 feet (543.5 m) above sea level. The site is promoted by the local historical society as a ghost town.

== History ==
Buncom was first settled by Chinese miners in 1851 when gold was discovered in nearby Sterling Creek and Jacksonville. Minerals such as cinnabar, chromite, and silver were also mined. A general store was built, and in 1861 J. T. Williams opened a saloon. The Buncom Mining District was created in 1867. Buncom post office was established in 1896. By 1918, the gold in the area was depleted, the post office was closed, and the town was abandoned. Most of the buildings were later burned down.

Only three buildings from the early 1900s remain: the post office (built in 1910), the cookhouse, and the bunkhouse. In 1991, the Buncom Historical Society was created. The society replaced all three of the roofs of the buildings in Buncom. The society has also restored the porch of the post office and the eaves of the cookhouse.

== Climate ==
This region experiences warm (but not hot) and dry summers, with no average monthly temperatures above 71.6 °F (22.0 °C). According to the Köppen Climate Classification system, Buncom has a warm-summer Mediterranean climate, abbreviated "Csb" on climate maps.

== See also ==
- List of ghost towns in Oregon
