= Carberry Creek =

Stream in Oregon, United States

Coordinates: 42°01′13″N 123°09′35″W

Carberry Creek is a stream in the U.S. state of Oregon. It empties into Applegate Lake.

Carberry Creek was named after Jim Carberry, a businessperson in the local mining industry.
