= Ruch, Oregon =

Unincorporated community in Oregon, US

- Census-designated place
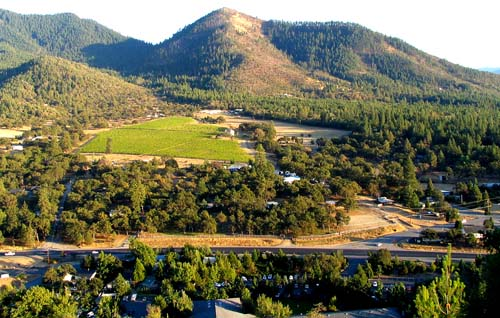

- Location within Oregon Location within the United States
- Coordinates: 42°14′14″N 123°2′29″W
- Country: United States
- State: Oregon
- County: Jackson

Area
  - Total: 6.73 sq mi (17.44 km^{2})
  - Land: 6.73 sq mi (17.44 km^{2})
  - Water: 0 sq mi (0.00 km^{2})
- Elevation: 1,527 ft (465 m)

Population (2020)
  - Total: 819
  - Density: 121.6/sq mi (46.95/km^{2})
- Time zone: UTC-8 (Pacific (PST))
  - Summer (DST): UTC-7 (PDT)
- ZIP code: 97530
- Area codes: 458 and 541
- FIPS code: 41-64150
- GNIS feature ID: 1148830

Ruch is an unincorporated community and census-designated place (CDP) in Jackson County, Oregon, United States. It is located on Oregon Route 238, southeast of Grants Pass. As of the 2020 census, Ruch had a population of 819.

Ruch was named after Casper M. Ruch, who bought a tract of land where the community now stands in 1896. He built a blacksmith shop, a store and a house. When he was appointed postmaster of the new post office in 1897 and allowed to name it, he named the post office after himself. The post office closed in 1939.

There are two structures listed on the National Register of Historic Places in Ruch—McKee Bridge and Star Ranger Station.

The Ruch area is home to several Oregon wineries and in the Applegate Valley AVA, a sub-appellation of the Rogue Valley AVA (American Viticultural Area). A small elementary school, Ruch Elementary, is located near the center of the community. The school serves Kindergarten to 8th grade with the Cougars as their mascot.

The Applegate River runs through the southwest edge of the valley.

== Climate ==
Ruch has a warm-summer Mediterranean climate (Csb) according to the Köppen climate classification system.

Climate data for Ruch, Oregon, 1991–2020 normals, extremes 1963–present
Month	Jan	Feb	Mar	Apr	May	Jun	Jul	Aug	Sep	Oct	Nov	Dec	Year
Record high °F (°C)	71 (22)	81 (27)	88 (31)	94 (34)	102 (39)	112 (44)	110 (43)	111 (44)	106 (41)	102 (39)	83 (28)	71 (22)	112 (44)
Mean maximum °F (°C)	63.1 (17.3)	69.0 (20.6)	76.2 (24.6)	83.3 (28.5)	91.7 (33.2)	97.5 (36.4)	102.6 (39.2)	103.1 (39.5)	98.9 (37.2)	87.5 (30.8)	71.1 (21.7)	61.3 (16.3)	105.2 (40.7)
Mean daily maximum °F (°C)	50.3 (10.2)	55.4 (13.0)	60.4 (15.8)	65.4 (18.6)	74.9 (23.8)	82.4 (28.0)	92.0 (33.3)	91.4 (33.0)	84.8 (29.3)	72.1 (22.3)	56.2 (13.4)	48.6 (9.2)	69.5 (20.8)
Daily mean °F (°C)	40.2 (4.6)	43.0 (6.1)	46.6 (8.1)	50.9 (10.5)	58.5 (14.7)	64.7 (18.2)	72.0 (22.2)	71.0 (21.7)	64.9 (18.3)	55.0 (12.8)	44.6 (7.0)	39.3 (4.1)	54.2 (12.4)
Mean daily minimum °F (°C)	30.1 (−1.1)	30.6 (−0.8)	32.9 (0.5)	36.3 (2.4)	42.2 (5.7)	47.1 (8.4)	52.0 (11.1)	50.7 (10.4)	44.9 (7.2)	38.0 (3.3)	33.1 (0.6)	30.1 (−1.1)	39.0 (3.9)
Mean minimum °F (°C)	21.6 (−5.8)	22.6 (−5.2)	24.5 (−4.2)	27.4 (−2.6)	32.6 (0.3)	37.6 (3.1)	43.7 (6.5)	42.1 (5.6)	35.4 (1.9)	28.1 (−2.2)	22.9 (−5.1)	20.0 (−6.7)	17.5 (−8.1)
Record low °F (°C)	8 (−13)	2 (−17)	18 (−8)	20 (−7)	25 (−4)	30 (−1)	34 (1)	32 (0)	22 (−6)	15 (−9)	12 (−11)	−3 (−19)	−3 (−19)
Average precipitation inches (mm)	4.36 (111)	3.03 (77)	2.98 (76)	2.13 (54)	1.42 (36)	0.70 (18)	0.52 (13)	0.40 (10)	0.58 (15)	2.33 (59)	3.92 (100)	5.08 (129)	27.45 (698)
Average snowfall inches (cm)	0.8 (2.0)	1.8 (4.6)	0.8 (2.0)	0.1 (0.25)	trace	0.0 (0.0)	0.0 (0.0)	0.0 (0.0)	0.0 (0.0)	0.0 (0.0)	0.4 (1.0)	1.5 (3.8)	5.4 (13.65)
Average precipitation days (≥ 0.01 in)	14.1	11.1	13.4	11.6	7.9	4.6	1.7	1.9	3.7	6.3	14.3	14.8	105.4
Average snowy days (≥ 0.1 in)	0.9	0.7	0.4	0.1	0.0	0.0	0.0	0.0	0.0	0.0	0.2	1.0	3.3
Source 1: NOAA (precip days, snow/snow days 1981–2010)
Source 2: National Weather Service

== Demographics ==
Historical population
Census	Pop.	Note	%±
2020	819		—
U.S. Decennial Census
