= Rogue Valley AVA =

American Viticultural Area in southern Oregon

Coordinates: 42°23′06″N 123°28′46″W

Rogue Valley
- Wine region
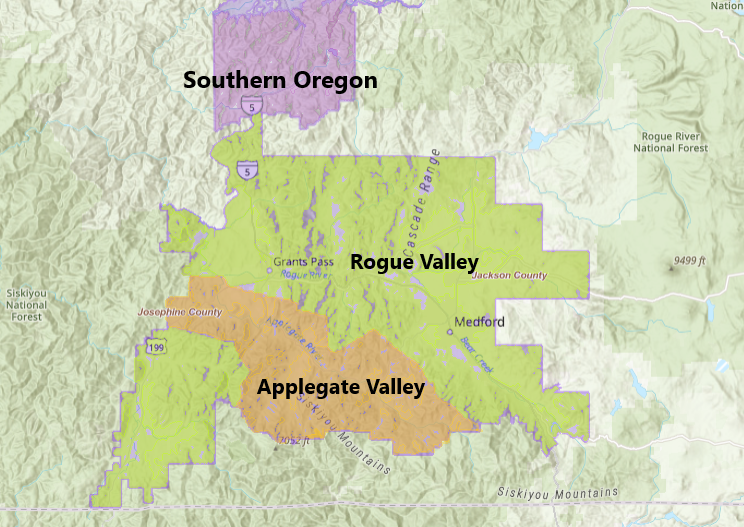
- Southern Oregon AVA (South)
- Type: American Viticultural Area
- Year established: 1991
- Country: United States
- Part of: Oregon, Southern Oregon AVA
- Other regions in Oregon, Southern Oregon AVA: Elkton Oregon AVA, Red Hill Douglas County AVA, Umpqua Valley AVA
- Sub-regions: Applegate Valley AVA
- Growing season: 180 days
- Climate region: Region II
- Heat units: 2,680 GDD units
- Precipitation (annual average): 28 inches (711 mm)
- Soil conditions: Volcanic, altered volcanic, sedimentary and intrusive igneous rocks in mountaisns; Floodplains, terraces, alluvial fan, and hills in valleys
- Total area: 1.15 million acres (1,797 sq mi)
- Size of planted vineyards: 4,000 acres (1,619 ha)
- No. of vineyards: 180
- Grapes produced: Cabernet Franc, Cabernet Sauvignon, Chardonnay, Dolcetto, Gewurztraminer, Grenache, Malbec, Merlot, Pinot Blanc, Pinot Gris, Pinot Noir, Sangiovese, Sauvignon Blanc, Semillon, Syrah, Tempranillo, Viognier
- No. of wineries: 45

Rogue Valley is an American Viticultural Area (AVA) located in Jackson and Josephine Counties, within Southern Oregon. The wine appellation was established as the nation's 111th, the state's fifth and both counties' initial AVA on January 23, 1991, by the Bureau of Alcohol, Tobacco and Firearms (ATF), Treasury after reviewing the petition submitted on August 29, 1989, by Mr. David R. Beaudry, a grape grower in Jackson County, on behalf of local growers, proposing a viticultural area in southwestern Oregon named "Rogue Valley."

The 1.15-million-acre (1,797 sq mi) appellation lies entirely within the vast multi-county Southern Oregon AVA and includes the drainage basins of the Rogue River and several tributaries, including the Illinois River, the Applegate River, and Bear Creek each within its valley landform. Most wineries in the region are found in the three tributaries' valleys than along the Rogue River itself. The region is 70 miles (113 km) wide by 60 miles (97 km) long where the acreage in the valleys is capable to produce high-quality wine grapes, but at the outset, were not yet cultivated. As of 2025, there are 180 vineyards cultivating approximately 4,000 acres (1,619 ha) and 45 wineries. Each river valley has a unique terroir, and grows different varieties of grapes. Overall, however, this region is the warmest and driest of Oregon's wine-growing regions. The USDA plant hardiness zone range is 7b to 9a.

== History ==
The beginning of viticulture in the Rogue Valley can be traced to Peter Britt who secured cuttings from the mission grapevines of California and by 1858 was making the first wine in the Oregon Territory. He established the Pacific Northwest’s first commercial winery, Valley View Vineyards in 1854, eventually making Jacksonville a wine making center. He eventually experimented with more than 200 varieties of grapes, ranging for advice as far as the German Wine Growers Association on the Rhine. By 1880, his sixty-to-seventy-acre (24 to 28 ha) vineyard and winery operation named Valley View Vineyard located near Jacksonville west of Medford, was producing up to 15,000 US gallons (56,781 L; 12,490 imp gal) a year. Records show that he made a very popular claret, along with muscatel, schiller, zinfandel and port. The Rogue River Courier newspaper, in 1905, reported the visit of Mr. A.H. Carson, the largest grape grower in Oregon, to Grants Pass in 1870. The newspaper reported that Mr. Carson's 30 acres (12 ha) of vineyards produced Tokay, Emperor and Black Ferrerra grapes. His vineyard was located on the Applegate River in the Missouri Flat district of Josephine County. Oregon enacted Prohibition in 1916 four years before the Eighteenth Amendment ratified it nationally shutting down the local viticulture industry until 1972, when Frank Wisnovsky reestablished Valley View Vineyards in Ruch south of Jacksonville. Farmers at Ashland in southwestern Oregon grew vinifera table grapes and were shipping Flame Tokays to market before the Tokay industry developed at Lodi, California.

== Terroir ==
=== Topography ===
The Rogue Valley is completely surrounded by three mountain ranges. At the northern and western boundaries of the Rogue Valley, the Siskiyou and Oregon Coast Ranges form a barrier. These ranges also form an effective dividing line geographically from the Umpqua Valley viticultural area to the north in Douglas County. To the south, the Siskiyou Mountains separate the Rogue Valley from the Klamath River Valley in northern California. In the east, the Cascade Mountains serve as a partition between the Rogue Valley and the Klamath River Basin in Klamath County, Oregon. The main tributaries of the Rogue River are: (1) Bear Creek which drains Medford. Ashland, and surrounding smaller communities, (2) the Applegate River which drains the south central part of the Valley, Jacksonville and the south Grants Pass area, (3) Evans Creek which drains Rogue River City, Wimer and the north central part of the Valley, and (4) the Illinois River which drains Hollarid, Cave Junction, Selma and the southwestern portion of the Valley, and which merges with the Rogue River at the town of Agness in Curry County. There are also many more small creeks and water systems which feed the Rogue River and its main tributaries.

=== Climate ===
The Rogue Valley is unique in Oregon viticulture in two respects: (1) The climate is warmer than anywhere else in the State and (2) the elevation is higher. For instance, the only zone II grape-growing area in Oregon is Grants Pass in the Rogue Valley. Here the "Heat summation" is listed at 2680 degree-days. This compares with the zone I figures of 2220 degrees for Roseburg, Oregon in the Umpqua Valley viticultural area and 2030 degree-days for Salem, Oregon in the Williamette Valley viticultural area. The heat summation for Medford in the Rogue Valley is 2650 degree-days. The greater warmth of the Rogue Valley allows certain grape varieties to achieve a level of success not found in the surrounding areas of western Oregon. In western Oregon, except for the Rogue Valley, the grape variety Merlot fails to set fruit reliably. Wines made from Rogue Valley Cabernet Sauvignon grapes are widely regarded as among the finest in Oregon. Ted Jordan Meredith, in his Northwest Wine Companion, states that Oregon's Williamette Valley is too cool for the best Cabernet Sauvignon, while further south, the Umpqua Valley and particularly the Rogue Valley, are capable of producing fine Cabernets. Mr. Meredith describes the Applegate Valley, within the Rogue Valley viticultural area, as one of the warmest grape-growing areas in western Oregon, and the Illinois Valley (also within the Rogue Valley viticultural area) as being only slightly cooler than the nearby Applegate Valley. Mr. Meredith also states that warmer climate grapes like Cabernet Sauvignon and Semillon are well-suited to the Illinois Valley.
The other great geological difference between the Rogue Valley and surrounding areas Is the high elevation of the land. The highest elevation vineyards in Oregon are all located in the Rogue Valley. The highest elevation vineyard in the Umpqua Valley viticultural area is lower in elevation than the lowest elevation Rogue Valley vineyard. Hillcrest Vineyard in the Umpqua Valley is at 850 feet (259 m) above sea level, while the Rogue Valley's lowest elevation vineyard is Rancho Vista Vineyard in Grants Pass at 1,100 feet (335 m). The remaining Rogue Valley vineyards are at even higher elevations.
Due to the higher elevations, the Rogue Valley experiences large drops in evening temperatures. The average range between high and low daily temperatures in July in the Medford area is 37 °F (3 °C), which is higher than any other location in Oregon. The average Medford July high is more than 86 °F (30 °C), and the average nighttime low is50 °F (10 °C). The low evening temperatures have a beneficial effect on wine grapes. The retention of grape acids is much better when the fruit is ripened in a cool environment. Also, cool nights aid significantly in the coloration of ripening grapes. These characteristics of high elevation viticulture lead to improved wine quality. The average length of the growing season In the Rogue Valley is 180 days, and the average annual rainfall is 28 inches (711 mm).

=== Soils ===
The Rogue River Rogue Valley is characterized by steep, rugged mountains and narrow river valleys. The Klamath, Siskiyou, and western Cascades are the principal mountain ranges in this area. These mountains are composed of volcanic, altered volcanic and sedimentary, and intrusive igneous rocks. The valleys consist of [[flood plains]], terraces, alluvial fans, and hills. The topography, parent material, and climate combine and interact to create soil properties unique to the area. Six of the ten soil orders (Vertisols, Ultisols, Mollisols, Alfisols, Inceptisols, and Entisold) occurring in the world are in the Rogue Valley area. The agricultural soils of Jackson and Josephine Counties are located in the 900-to-2,000-foot (274–610 m) elevation range. In Jackson County, soil pH ranges from 5.8 to about 6.6. Josephine County soils have a pH range of 5.7 to about 6.4. Jackson County has some soil series that are of clay texture, principally Carney, Coker, and Phoenix clays. These clay series are not found in Josephine County. There are at least ten soils series that are common to both counties. They are Barron. Camas, Central Point, Cove, Debenger, Evans, Kerby, Newberg, Pollard and Ruch. The soils of Jackson and Josephine Counties are much more closely related to each other than to those of the Willamette Valley, coastal, or eastern Oregon areas. Soils of the Willamette Valley formed under at least 40 inches (1,016 mm) of annual precipitation and they are considerably more acid than those of the Rogue Valley, having pH ranges of 5.4 to 6.0.

== Regions ==
=== Applegate Valley ===
Applegate Valley is the only sub-appellation, established in 2000, within Rogue Valley. The Applegate River flows through the town of Applegate and near the city of Jacksonville, which was the location in 1854 of the first commercial winery in the Pacific Northwest which was restored and re-opened in the original name Valley View Winery in 1972. This region contains vineyards at altitudes ranging from 1,000 to 1,500 feet (300–500 m) above sea level, and is warmer and drier than the Illinois Valley to the west, but less so than the Bear Creek Valley to the east. Grapes that thrive here include Merlot, Cabernet Sauvignon, Syrah, Chardonnay and Zinfandel, with Syrah, Merlot, and Viognier being the dominant varietals, with additional strengths in Pinot Noir and Chardonnay.

=== Bear Creek Valley ===
Bear Creek is the most populated of the Rogue River tributaries, as it flows through the cities of Medford and Ashland. The valley floor runs parallel with the Interstate 5 corridor and is 2,000 feet (610 m) above sea level. The warm, dry climate of the Bear Creek Valley is similar to that of Bordeaux, and it is well suited for cultivating varietals such as Cabernet Sauvignon, Merlot, Chardonnay, Cabernet Franc, Pinot Gris, Sauvignon Blanc, Malbec and Syrah.

=== Illinois Valley ===
The westernmost tributary of the Rogue River is the Illinois River that which rises in southern Josephine County in the Red Buttes Wilderness. The river flows generally northwest along the west side of the Klamath Mountains, past Cave Junction, Kerby and through the Siskiyou National Forest. It joins the Rogue River from the south on the Curry-Josephine county line, approximately 15 miles (24 km) from the Pacific Ocean. The region is marked by high elevation, and is significantly influenced by marine climates. The region is well-suited for growing Burgundy varietals, similar to those grown in the Willamette Valley AVA.
