= Applegate =

Applegate may refer to:

== Places ==
- Applegate, California, United States
- Applegate, Michigan, United States
- Applegate, Oregon, United States
- Applegate Peak in Oregon
- The Applegate River in Oregon
  - Applegate Lake, on the Applegate River
  - Applegate Valley, along the Applegate River
  - Applegate Valley AVA, an American Viticultural Area
- Applegate Trail, a pioneer trail through the Oregon Territory
- Applegate language, a language in the Athabaskan group
- Applegate tribe, a Native American people

== Other uses ==
- Applegate (surname)

== See also ==
- Apple (disambiguation)
- Gate (disambiguation)
- Mr. Applegate (disambiguation)
