= Applegate Valley =

Valley in Oregon, United States

Coordinates: 42.32°N 123.29°W

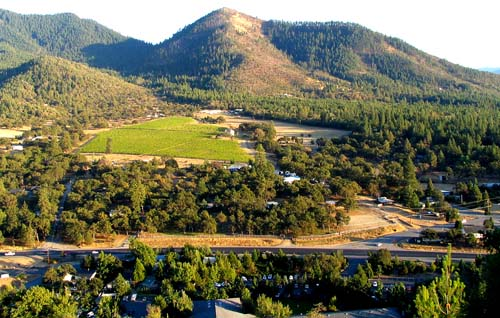
Image of Ruch, Oregon

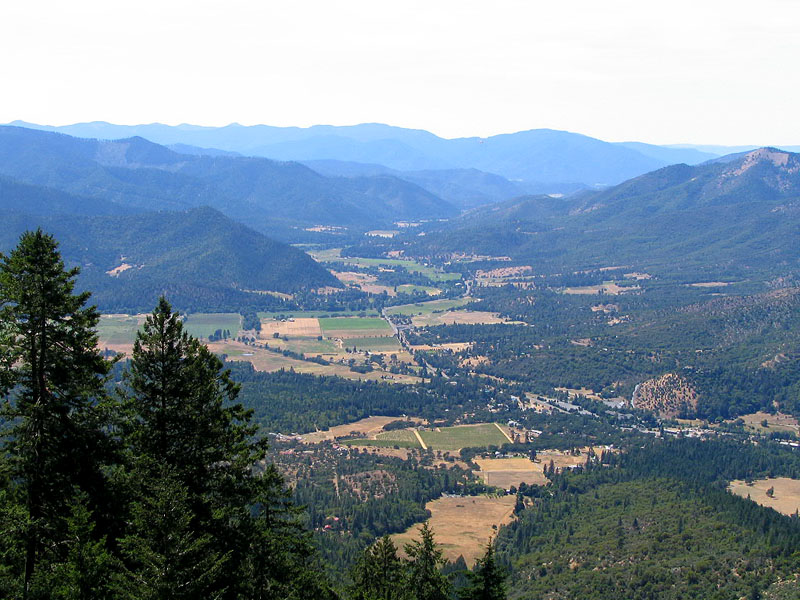
A view of Applegate Valley from Woodrat Mountain

Applegate Valley is the valley of the Applegate River in Southern Oregon, United States and extending slightly into Northern California. Applegate Valley is in Jackson County to the east and Josephine County to the west, and includes a little bit of Siskiyou County in California near Applegate Lake. It encompasses the area between Jacksonville and Grants Pass. Oregon Route 238 (Jacksonville Highway) is a main route through the valley. The five recognized unincorporated communities in Applegate Valley are Ruch and Applegate in Jackson County, and Williams, Murphy, and Wilderville in Josephine County.

Many wineries of the Applegate Valley AVA (American Viticultural Area), a sub-appellation of the Rogue Valley AVA, are located in the valley.

Tallowbox Trail, a trail which passes through the valley and terminates at Tallowbox Mountain, was opened to the public in 2024.

The area is also a known medical marijuana growing region.

== See also ==
- Applegate, Oregon
- Ruch, Oregon
