= Oregon wine =

Oregon
- Wine region
- AVA Map courtesy of Oregon Wine Board
- Official name: State of Oregon
- Type: U.S. State Appellation
- Year established: 1859
- Years of wine industry: 179
- Country: United States
- Other regions in vicinity: Idaho, Washington
- Sub-regions: Applegate Valley AVA, Chehalem Mountains AVA, Columbia Gorge AVA, Columbia Valley AVA, Dundee Hills AVA, Elkton Oregon AVA, Eola-Amity Hills AVA, Laurelwood District AVA, Lower Long Tom AVA, McMinnville AVA, Mount Pisgah, Polk County, Oregon AVA, Red Hill Douglas County, Oregon AVA, Ribbon Ridge AVA, The Rocks District of Milton-Freewater AVA, Rogue Valley AVA, Snake River Valley AVA, Southern Oregon AVA, Tualatin Hills AVA, Umpqua Valley AVA, Van Duzer Corridor AVA, Walla Walla Valley AVA, Willamette Valley AVA, Yamhill-Carlton District AVA
- Climate region: Region I-III (Maritime/continental/Mediterranean)
- Total area: 61.4 million acres (95,988 sq mi)
- Size of planted vineyards: Over 44,487 acres (18,003 ha) (2022)
- No. of vineyards: 1476 (2022)
- Grapes produced: Abouriou, Albariño, Aligoté, Arneis, Auxerrois Blanc, Baco noir, Barbera, Black Muscat, Blaufränkisch, Cabernet Franc, Cabernet Sauvignon, Caprettone, Carménère, Cayuga, Chardonnay, Chasselas, Chenin blanc, Coda di Volpe, Counoise, Dolcetto, Early Muscat, Ehrenfelser, Fiano, Frontenac, Gamay noir, Gewurztraminer, Gouais blanc, Graciano, Grenache, Grenache blanc, Gruner Veltliner, Huxelrebe, Kerner, La Crosse, La Crescent, Lagrein, Leon Millot, Malbec, Marechal Foch, Malvasia, Marquette, Marsanne, Melon, Merlot, Mondeuse noire, Montepulciano, Mourvèdre, Muller Thurgau, Muscat Canelli, Muscat Ottonel, Nebbiolo, Niagara, Petit Verdot, Pinot blanc, Pinot gris, Pinot Meunier, Pinot noir, Pinotage, Riesling, Petit Manseng, Petite Sirah, Roussanne, Sangiovese, Sauvignon blanc, Scheurebe, Sémillon, Seyval blanc, St. Croix, St. Laurent, Sylvaner, Syrah, Tannat, Tempranillo, Teroldego, Tinta Amarela, Tinta Cao, Tocai Friulano, Touriga Nacional, Traminette, Trousseau, Verdejo, Vermentino, Vignoles, Viognier, Zinfandel
- Varietals produced: 82
- No. of wineries: 1116 (2022) of which 612 are crushing grapes

Oregon wine refers to wine grapes grown in the U.S. state appellation of Oregon. Its national reputation for its production of wine ranks fourth behind California, Washington, and New York. Oregon has several different growing regions within the state's borders that are well-suited to the cultivation of grapes; additional regions straddle the border between Oregon and the states of Washington and Idaho. Wine making dates back to pioneer times in the 1840s, with commercial production beginning in the 1960s.

American Viticultural Areas (AVA) entirely within the state borders are the Willamette Valley AVA, with ten sub-appellations, and the Southern Oregon AVA, with five sub-appellations. The Columbia Gorge, Walla Walla Valley, and Snake River Valley AVAs extend acreage into the adjacent states of Washington or Idaho.

Total wine production was 137,065 short tons (124,343 t) in 2022. Pinot noir and Pinot Gris are the top two grapes grown, with over 104,519 short tons (94,818 t) harvested in 2022, up from 59,452 short tons (53,934 t) in 2016. In aggregate, the most valuable grape is Chardonnay with a 2022 price per short ton of $2,908 (average) or $2,861 (median). But Pinot Noir commands the high end with the top three growers averaging $5,824 per short ton in 2022, versus Chardonnay's $4,114. Oregon winemakers sold just over 5.7 million cases in 2022, up from just under 3.4 million cases in 2016.

With 1116 wineries in Oregon, a tourism industry has developed around wine tasting. Much of the tourism focuses on the wineries and tasting rooms in and around the Yamhill Valley southwest of Portland. It is estimated that enotourism contributed US$207.5 million to the state economy in 2013 excluding sales at wineries and tasting rooms.

== History ==
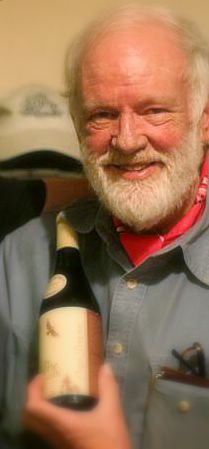
David Lett of Eyrie Vineyards.

Wine has been produced in Oregon since the Oregon Territory was settled in the 1840s; however, viticulture became a significant industry in the state since the 1960s innovations. Grapes were first planted in the Oregon Territory in 1847 when Oregon Trail pioneer Henderson Luelling and his family transport several dozen varieties of fruit plantings from Iowa to the Oregon Territory, including Oregon’s first grape plantings. In 1852, Valley View, the first recorded winery, was established by Peter Britt in Jacksonville. Throughout the 19th century, there was experimentation with various varietals by immigrants to the state. In 1904, an Oregon winemaker won a prize at the St. Louis World's Fair. Wine production stopped in the United States during Prohibition. As in other states, the Oregon wine industry lay dormant for thirty years after Prohibition was repealed.

The Oregon wine industry started to rebuild in the 1960s, when California winemakers opened several vineyards in the state. By 1970, there were five commercial wineries, with 35 recorded acres (14 ha).

This included the planting of Pinot noir grapes in the Willamette Valley, a region long thought too cold to be suitable for viticulture. In the 1970s, more out-of-state winemakers migrated to the state and started to organize as an industry. The state's land-use laws had prevented rural hillsides from being turned into housing tracts, preserving a significant amount of land suitable for vineyards. In 1979, The Eyrie Vineyards entered a 1975 Pinot noir in the Wine Olympics; the wine was rated among the top Pinots in the world, thus gaining the region its first international recognition.

The accolades continued into the 1980s, and the Oregon wine industry continued to add both wineries and vineyards. The state industry continued to market itself, establishing the first of several AVAs (American Viticulture Areas) in the state. The state also grew strong ties with the Burgundy region of France, as Oregon's governor Neil Goldschmidt paid an official visit to Burgundy and a leading French winemaking family bought land in Dundee.

In the early 1990s, the wine industry was threatened by a Phylloxera infestation in the state, but winemakers quickly turned to the use of resistant rootstocks to prevent any serious damage. The state legislature enacted several new laws designed to promote winemaking and wine distribution. The state found a newfound focus on "green" winemaking, leading the global wine industry into more environmentally friendly practices. In 2005, there were 314 wineries and 519 vineyards in operation in Oregon. By 2014, the a number of wineries in the state has increased to 676, the 3rd most behind California and Washington. Oregon remains the 4th largest wine producer in the country in cases produced behind New York.

== Varieties of wine ==
Like other wines produced in the United States, Oregon wines are marketed as varietals. Oregon law requires that wines produced in the state must be identified by the grape variety from which it was made, and for most varietals, it must contain at least 90% of that variety. The exceptions to the 90% law are the following varietals: Red and White Bordeaux varietals, Red and White Rhône varietals, Sangiovese, Tempranillo, Zinfandel and Tannat. For these wines, they follow the Federal guidelines of 75%. Oregon law has long forbidden the use of place names, except as appellations of origin. Oregon is most famous for its Pinot noir, which is produced throughout the state. Pinot noirs from the Willamette Valley have received much critical acclaim from wine connoisseurs and critics, and Oregon is regarded as one of the premier Pinot-producing regions in the world.

In 2022 the top five varieties produced in Oregon were:

- Pinot noir 24,729 acres (10,007 ha), 78,766 short tons (71,455 t)
- Pinot gris 5,546 acres (2,244 ha), 25,763 short tons (23,372 t)
- Chardonnay 2,518 acres (1,019 ha), 6,963 short tons (6,317 t)
- Syrah 1,679 acres (679 ha), 4,895 short tons (4,441 t)
- Cabernet Sauvignon 1,557 acres (630 ha), 4,596 short tons (4,169 t)

Other varieties with significant production by harvested acres in 2022 are Merlot, Riesling, Viognier, Tempranillo, Pinot blanc, Cabernet franc, Malbec, Gamay noir, Gewürztraminer, and Albarino. Historically, V. vinifera based wines produced in smaller quantities include Arneis, Baco noir, Black Muscat, Chenin blanc, Dolcetto, Grenache, Marechal Foch, Muscat, Müller-Thurgau, Nebbiolo, Petite Syrah, Sangiovese, Sauvignon blanc, Sémillon and Zinfandel. The state also produces fruit wine, sparkling wine, late harvest wine, ice wine, and dessert wine.

== Facts and figures ==
Oregon wine statistics 1995–2016
Year	Planted Vineyard Area	# Wineries crushing grapes	Grapes crushed, tons (US)	Sales, cases
1995	7,100 acres (2,873 ha)	92	14,280 short tons (12,955 t)	734,437
1996	7,500 acres (3,035 ha)	94	15,191 short tons (13,781 t)	741,953
1997	7,800 acres (3,157 ha)	94	18,669 short tons (16,936 t)	827,312
1998	9,000 acres (3,600 ha)	103	13,265 short tons (12,034 t)	894,386
1999	9,800 acres (3,966 ha)	102	16,523 short tons (14,989 t)	777,890
2000	10,500 acres (4,249 ha)	122	17,663 short tons (16,024 t)	991,770
2001	11,100 acres (4,492 ha)	131	22,163 short tons (20,106 t)	1,082,058
2002	12,100 acres (4,897 ha)	150	20,905 short tons (18,965 t)	1,073,177
2003	13,400 acres (5,423 ha)	170	21,860 short tons (19,831 t)	1,199,086
2004	13,700 acres (5,544 ha)	193	18,620 short tons (16,892 t)	1,286,128
2005	14,100 acres (5,706 ha)	215	23,450 short tons (21,273 t)	1,591,330
2006	15,600 acres (6,300 ha)	236	33,300 short tons (30,200 t)	1,628,608
2007	17,400 acres (7,000 ha)	254	37,000 short tons (34,000 t)	1,711,532
2008	19,300 acres (7,800 ha)	274	34,700 short tons (31,500 t)	1,748,282
2009	19,400 acres (7,900 ha)	275	40,200 short tons (36,500 t)	1,660,202
2010	20,500 acres (8,300 ha)	315	29,800 short tons (27,000 t)	1,930,763
2011	20,400 acres (8,300 ha)	350	42,033 short tons (38,132 t)	2,040,698
2012	22,880 acres (9,260 ha)	379	50,186 short tons (45,528 t)	2,379,165
2013	23,955 acres (9,694 ha)	370	52,588 short tons (47,707 t)	2,678,807
2014	27,390 acres (11,080 ha)	412	70,112 short tons (63,605 t)	2,864,963
2015	28,034 acres (11,345 ha)		71,849 short tons (65,180 t)	3,093,661
2016	30,435 acres (12,317 ha)	424	67,918 short tons (61,614 t)	3,390,958

As of the 2022 wine growing season, the state of Oregon has 1116 wineries, of which 612 are crushing grapes, and 1474 vineyards growing Vitis vinifera, composing a total of 44,487 acres (18,003 ha) of which 40,774 acres (16,501 ha) were harvested. Out of all US wine growing regions, Oregon ranks third in number of wineries and fourth in production. Oregon winemakers sold just over 5.7 million cases in 2022, up from just under 3.4 million cases in 2016. The retail value of these cases was $956,424,346 a 13% increase over the previous vintage.

The industry has had a significant economic impact on the state. The industry contributed a total of US$8.17 billion to the Oregon economy in 2022. It supports 39,437 direct and indirect jobs as of 2022, with $1.69 billion in wages, up from 17,100 jobs with $527 million in wages in 2013. Direct employment is 15,332 jobs within Oregon as of 2022 with over $545 million in gross payroll.

In 2014 70% was sold to US markets outside Oregon and 4% was sold internationally. By 2022, 60% was sold to US markets outside Oregon, plus 10.6% sold directly nationwide through wine clubs and web orders and 2.8% sold internationally.

Oregon produces wine on a much smaller scale than the California wine industry. Oregon's leading producer, King Estate, ships only 401,400 cases per year and most produce under 35,000 cases. The state features many small wineries that produce less than 5,000 cases per year. In contrast, E & J Gallo, the United States' largest winery with more than 50 different brands including Washington's Columbia Winery and Covey Run holds a 22.8% share of the US market. The majority of wineries in the state operate their own vineyards, although some purchase grapes on the market. Oregon contains a significant number of independent vineyards.

The Oregon wine industry focuses on the higher-priced segments of the wine market. Oregon growers receive a higher average return per ton and a higher average revenue per case than do growers in other wine-producing regions in the United States. Despite producing a much smaller volume of wine, Oregon winery revenues per capita are comparable to those of New York and Washington.

== Major wine-producing regions ==
There are, loosely speaking, three main wine producing regions with a major presence in the state of Oregon, as defined by non-overlapping American Viticultural Areas. Two of them—the Willamette Valley AVA and the Southern Oregon AVA—are wholly contained within Oregon; a third, the Columbia Gorge AVA straddles the Columbia River and includes territory in both Oregon and Washington; however, this AVA is considered to be an Oregon AVA. Portions of the Walla Walla Valley AVA, an area primarily in Washington (along with the Columbia Valley AVA, which contains it), descend into Oregon in the Milton-Freewater area. The Southern Oregon AVA was recently created as the union of two Southern Oregon winegrowing regions long considered distinct, the Rogue Valley and the Umpqua Valley. Several other smaller AVAs are found within some of these larger regions. The Snake River Valley AVA, which straddles Oregon's border with Idaho along the Snake River, is the first AVA to include a part of Eastern Oregon.

=== Willamette Valley AVA ===
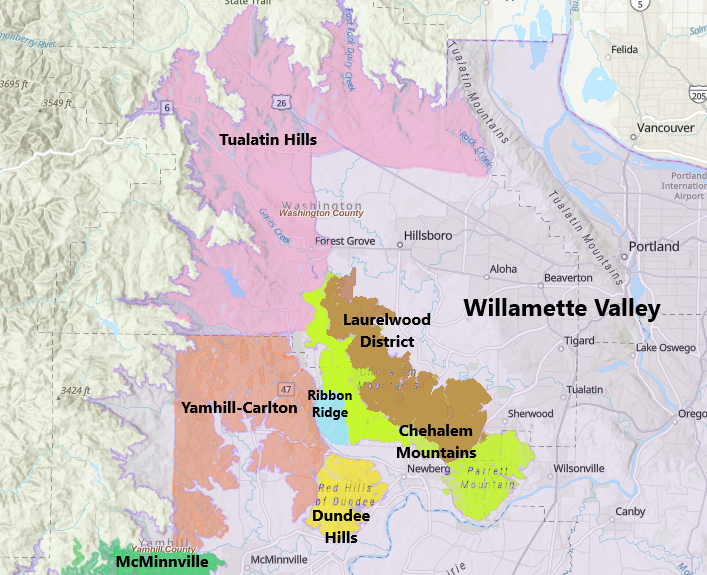
Northern Williamette Valley AVAs

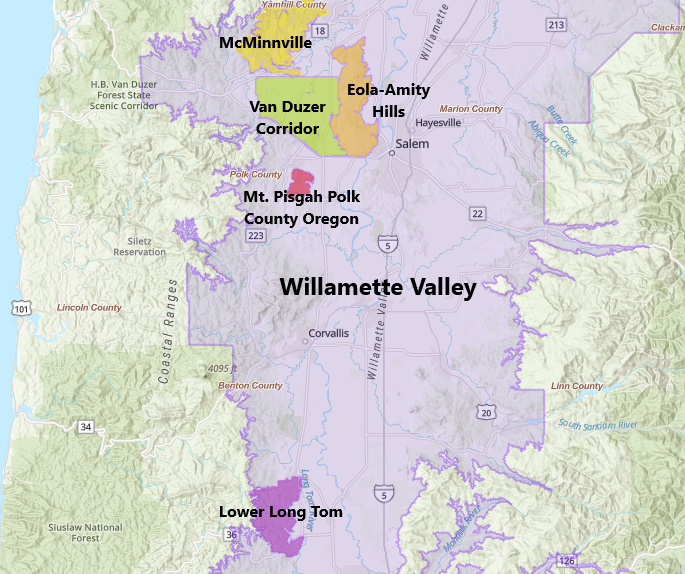
Southern Williamette Valley AVAs

The Willamette Valley AVA is the wine growing region that encompasses the Willamette Valley. It stretches from the Columbia River in the north to just south of Eugene in the south, where the Willamette Valley ends; and from the Oregon Coast Range in the West to the Cascade Mountains in the East. The 5,200-square-mile (13,500 km^{2}) appellation is the state's largest and contains most of its wineries with 736 as of 2025.

The climate of Willamette Valley is mild year-round, with cool, wet winters and warm, dry summers; extreme temperatures are uncommon. Most rainfall occurs outside the growing season and the valley gets relatively little snow. Not all parts of the Valley are suitable for viticulture, and most wineries and vineyards are found west of the Willamette River, with the largest concentration in Yamhill County.

The region is best known for its Pinot noir, and also produces large amounts of Pinot gris, Chardonnay, Pinot blanc, and Riesling. The region also produces Cabernet Sauvignon, Gewürztraminer, Müller-Thurgau, Sémillon, and Zinfandel grapes, but in far smaller quantities.

The valley contains 11 distinctive sub-appellations: Chehalem Mountains AVA, Dundee Hills AVA, Eola-Amity Hills AVA, Laurelwood District AVA, Lower Long Tom AVA, McMinnville AVA, Mount Pisgah, Polk County, Oregon AVA, Ribbon Ridge AVA, Tualatin Hills AVA, Van Duzer Corridor AVA and Yamhill-Carlton District AVA. Ribbon Ridge and Laurelwood District are located entirely within Chehalem Mountains viticultural area. Although not officially recognized, many vintners further define the Willamette Valley into northern and southern regions with the demarcation being the latitude of Salem (approximately 45° north).

=== Southern Oregon AVA ===
The Southern Oregon AVA was formed as the union of two existing AVAs, Rogue Valley and Umpqua Valley. (A small strip of the connecting territory is included in the Southern Oregon AVA to make it a contiguous region; however, this strip passes through mountains regions not suitable for vineyards.) The viticultural area was established in 2004 to allow the two principal regions in Southern Oregon to jointly market themselves.

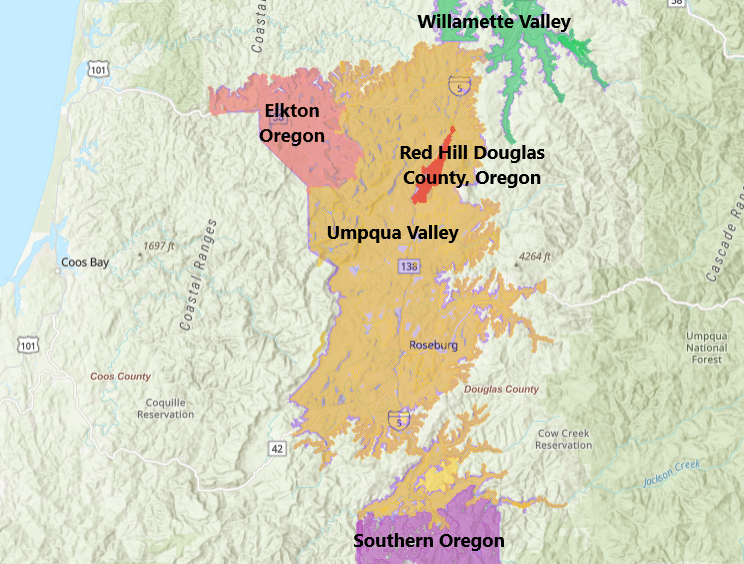
Southern Oregon (north)

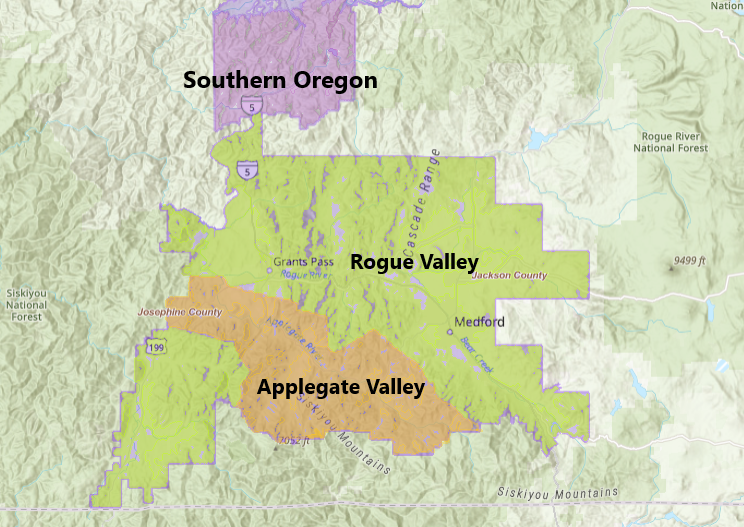
Southern Oregon (south)

==== Umpqua Valley AVA ====
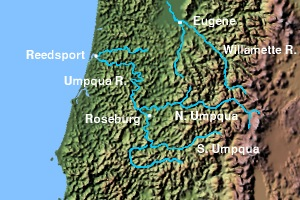
Umpqua River with tributaries

The Umpqua Valley AVA contains the drainage basin of the Umpqua River, excluding mountainous regions. The Umpqua Valley has a warmer climate than the Willamette Valley, but is cooler than the Rogue Valley to the south. It is the oldest post-prohibition wine region in Oregon. Grapes grown here include Tempranillo, Baco noir, Pinot noir, Pinot gris, Cabernet Sauvignon, Chardonnay, and Riesling, Grüner Veltliner, and a host of lesser-known Vitis vinifera. The region includes two sub-AVAs, the Red Hill Douglas County, Oregon AVA, a single vineyard AVA, as well as the Elkton Oregon AVA, which was established in early 2013.

==== Rogue Valley AVA ====
The Rogue Valley AVA includes the drainage basin of the Rogue River and several tributaries, including the Illinois River, the Applegate River, and Bear Creek. Most wineries in the region are found along with one of these three tributaries, rather than along the Rogue River itself. The region is 70 miles (110 km) wide by 60 miles (100 km) long (although much of the land within the AVA is not suitable for grape cultivation); there are currently 32 wineries with only 1,100 acres (445 ha) planted. The three valleys differ greatly in terroir, with the easternmost Bear Creek valley being warmest and driest, and the westernmost Illinois River valley being coolest and wettest. Each river valley has a unique climate and grows different varieties of grapes. Overall, however, this region is the warmest and driest of Oregon's wine-growing regions. The region has one sub-AVA, the Applegate Valley AVA.

=== Columbia Gorge AVA ===
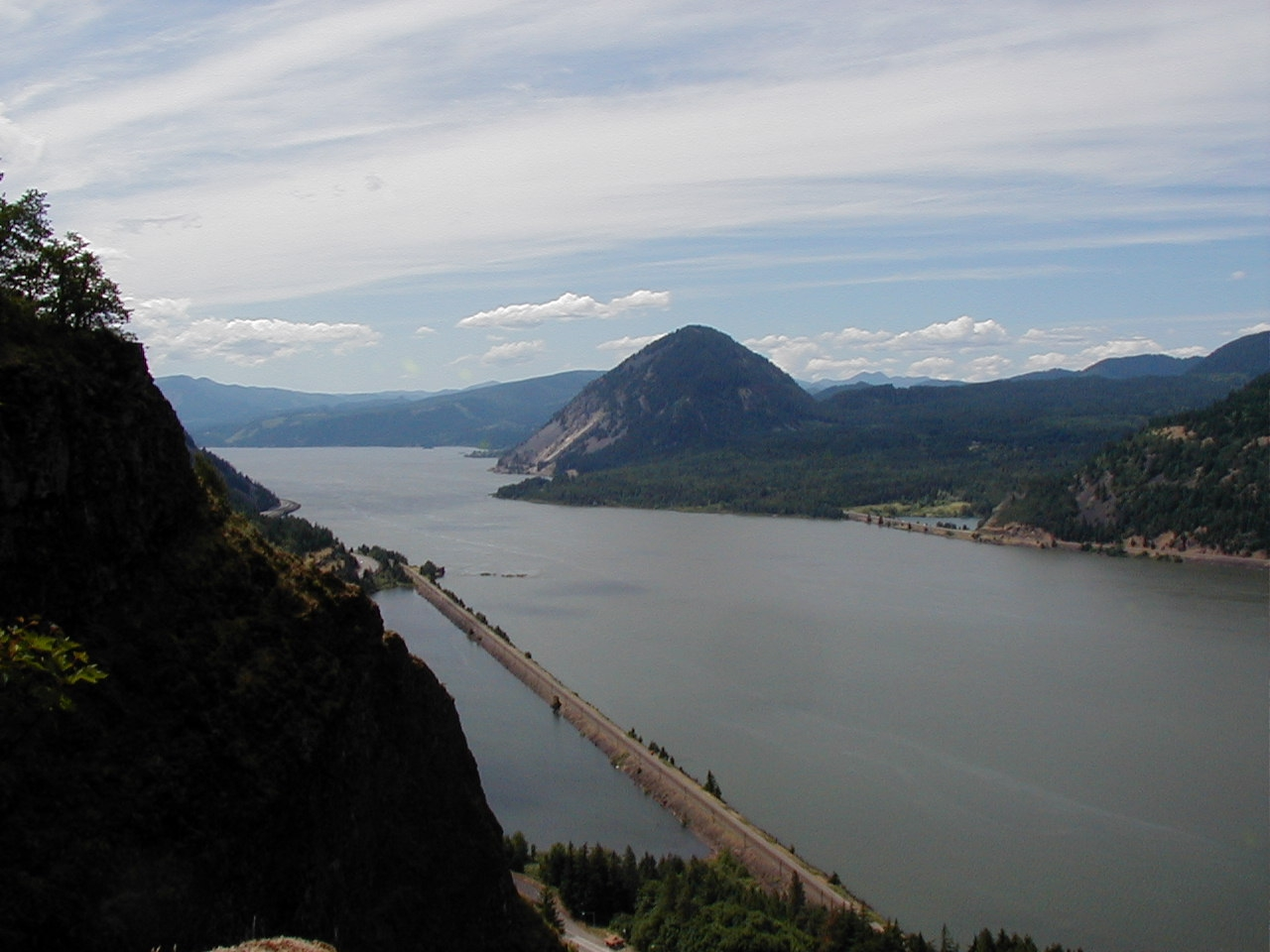
The Columbia River (shown here in Hood River County, Oregon) is at the heart of the Columbia Gorge AVA

The Columbia Gorge AVA is found in the Columbia Gorge. This region straddles the Columbia River, and thus lies in both Oregon and Washington; it is made up of Hood River and Wasco counties in Oregon, and Skamania and Klickitat counties in Washington.

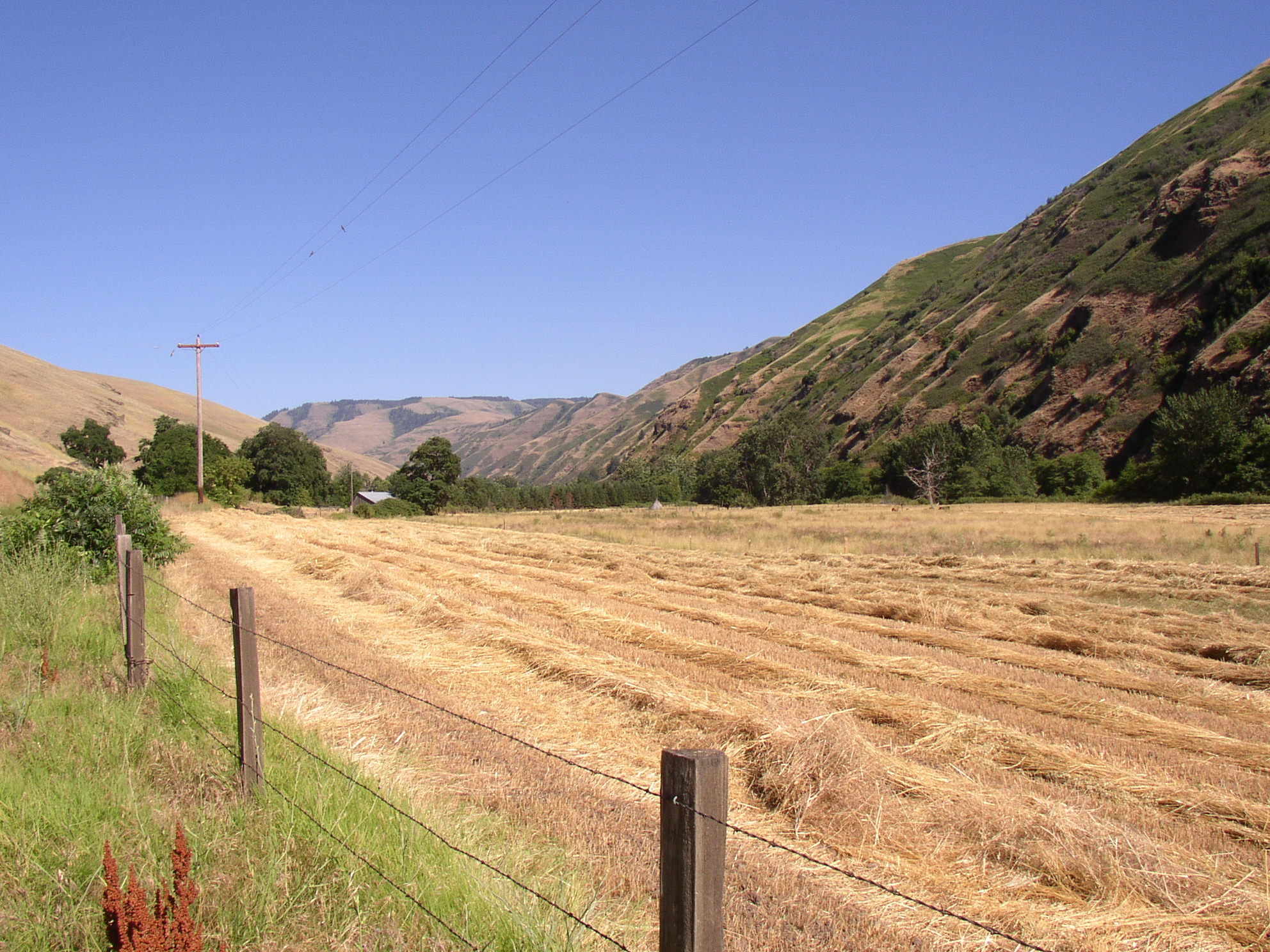
Valley of the North Fork of the Walla Walla River above Milton-Freewater in Oregon

The region lies to the east of the summits of nearby Mount Hood and Mount Adams, situated in their rain shadows; thus, the region is significantly drier than the Willamette Valley. It also exhibits significant differences in elevation due to gorge geography, and strong winds common in the area also play a factor in the region's climate. This allows a wide variety of grapes to be grown in the Columbia Gorge. The region has nearly 40 vineyards, growing a wide variety of grapes, including Syrah, Pinot noir, Chardonnay, Gewürztraminer, Zinfandel, Cabernet Sauvignon, Pinot gris, Riesling, and Sangiovese.

=== Columbia Valley AVA ===
Portions of northeastern Oregon (in the vicinity of Milton-Freewater) are part of the Walla Walla Valley AVA established in 1984; which in turn is nested within the Columbia Valley AVA. Both Columbia Valley and Walla Walla Valley AVAs reside primarily within Washington state. The Oregon subsection has 5 wineries and 1,200 acres (486 ha) planted. Wines grown in the valley include Syrah, Merlot, and Cabernet Sauvignon, as well as Sangiovese and a few exotic varietals including Counoise, Carmenère, Mourvèdre, Cabernet Franc, Nebbiolo and Barbera.

The Rocks District of Milton–Freewater was established in 2015.

=== Snake River Valley AVA ===
A new viticultural area along the Snake River was established on April 9, 2007. Principally located in Idaho, the area also encompasses two large counties in Eastern Oregon, Baker County and Malheur County. The region's climate is unique among AVAs in Oregon; the average temperature is relatively cool and rainfall is low, creating a shorter growing season. Current production is led by hardy grapes such as Riesling, Gewürztraminer, and Chardonnay. The climate also lends itself extremely well to the production of ice wine. However, the AVA is quite large and warmer microclimates within the area can also support different types of grapes such as Cabernet Sauvignon and Merlot.

== Enotourism ==
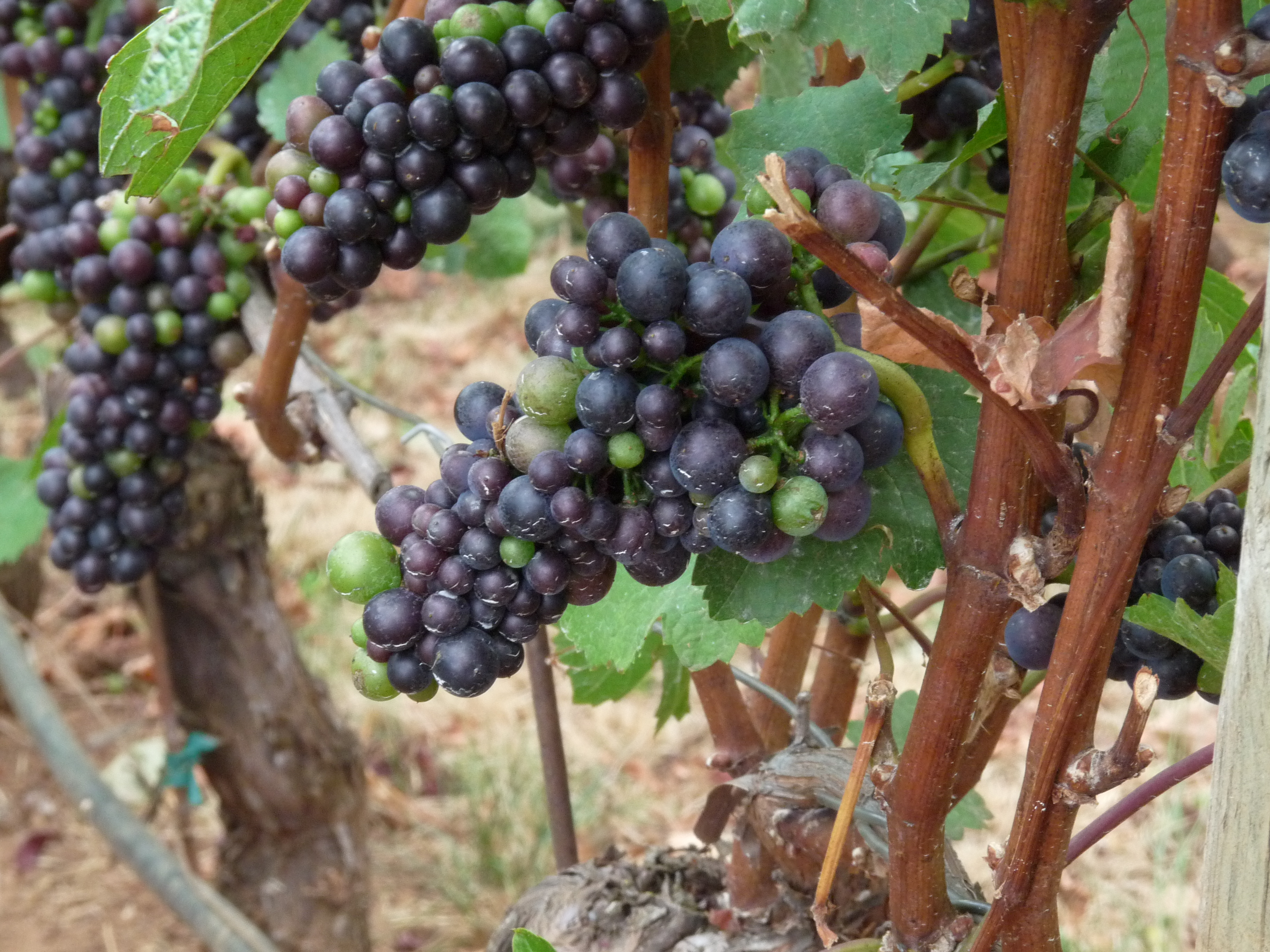
Pinot grapes growing in the Willamette Valley AVA.

With the continuing improvement in the region's winemaking reputation, Oregon enotourism has become a significant industry in its own right. On-site sales are becoming an increasingly important part of the business of Oregon winemaking, and other businesses that cater to wine tourists, such as lodging, fine restaurants, art galleries, have been appearing in places like Dundee, many of which have long been rural farming communities. Wine festivals and tastings are commonplace. It is estimated that enotourism contributed US$207.5 million to the state economy in 2013 excluding sales at wineries and tasting rooms. There are approximately 1.8 million visits to Oregon wineries each year, 59% by Oregonians and 41% from out-of-state visitors. Major events drawing significant numbers of tourists to wine country include the International Pinot Noir Celebration which is held the last weekend of July every year since 1987 and the more recent Oregon Chardonnay Celebration.

Since wine themed events are a significant driver of tourism new ones are launched each year. Memorial Day weekend and Thanksgiving weekend (since 1983) feature open house events at most wineries across the entire state. ¡Salud! is a wine fundraising organization that has held annual November auctions since 1991. The Pour Oregon wine festival, launched in 2017 by Oregon wine club Cellar 503, typically features 50+ wineries from the entire state.

Facilities for wine tourists in Oregon are considered underdeveloped compared to wine regions in California, especially premium growing regions like the Napa Valley AVA. Only 5% of overnight leisure trips in the state involve visits to wineries, a much smaller figure than comparable Californian growing regions, which range from 10% to 25%.

The increase in winery-related tourism, as well as the presence of a casino in the Willamette Valley, has greatly impacted the region's transportation infrastructure. Oregon Route 99W, the highway running through the heart of Willamette Valley wine country (and which is the main street in towns such as Newberg and Dundee), is plagued with frequent traffic jams. Phase I of the Newberg-Dundee Bypass, a new highway that avoids the congested city centers opened in January 2018, and a second phase (currently in the design process) will allow for further diversion of traffic off of 99W.

== Wine industry ==
A number of organizations have been established to promote Oregon wine. The Oregon Wine Board and Oregon Wine Grower's Association produce the Oregon Wine Symposium annually in February.

== Recognition ==
=== Recognition for quality ===
Oregon wines have won several major awards, and/or been praised by notable wine critics.

- In 1904, Forest Grove winemaker Ernest Reuter won a silver medal at the St. Louis World's Fair
- In 1979, Eyrie Vineyards' 1975 South Block Pinot noir placed in the top 10 of Burgundy-style wines at the Gault-Millau French Wine Olympiades, and was rated the top Pinot noir. In a rematch, however, the Eyrie finished second to a French wine.
- Two gold medals in the International Wine Competition in London in 1982
- A Yamhill Valley Vineyards 1983 Pinot noir was the first place preference at the 1985 Oregon Pinot noir/French Burgundy Challenge at the International Wine Center in New York City

=== Other recognition ===
- Evening Lands's 98 point 2012 Eola-Amity Hills Seven Springs Vineyard La Source Pinot Noir was #3 of 100 on 2015 Wine Spectator's annual Top 100 Wines. Five other Oregon wines made the 2015 list: Big Table Farm's 2012 Willamette Valley Pinot Noir at No. 11, Bergström's 2013 Ribbon Ridge Le Pré Du Col Vineyard Pinot Noir at No. 13, Soléna's 2012 Willamette Valley Grande Cuvée Pinot Noir at No. 38 and Colene Clemens' 2012 Chehalem Mountains Margo Pinot Noir at No. 45.
- Beaux Freres The Upper Terrace 2012 received the second higher score in the history of Oregon wine a 97 also from Wine Spectator.
- In 2006, seven Oregon wines made Wine Spectator's annual Top 100 Wines list. Producers on the list included: Shea, Argyle, Archery Summit, Lemelson, Ken Wright, Elk Cove, and Benton Lane.

== Notable wineries and vineyards ==
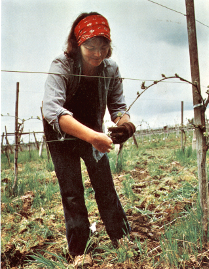
Nancy Ponzi, of Ponzi Vineyards, a pioneer in the Oregon wine industry

Name	Location	Established	Notes
Adelsheim Vineyard	Chehalem Mountains AVA	1971	First winery in the Chehalem Mountains. David Adelsheim has been instrumental in the Willamette Valley wine industry.
Bells Up Winery	Ribbon Ridge AVA	ca. 2012	Started by Steve Pearce, a former tax attorney, after the death of his wife's professional mentor from Stage Four breast cancer in 2008.
Domaine Drouhin	Dundee Hills AVA	1988	Long established French estate invests in Oregon.
The Eyrie Vineyards	McMinnville (winery); Dundee Hills AVA (vineyards)	1966	David Lett of The Eyrie Vineyards is widely considered the father of Oregon Pinot Noir.
HillCrest Vineyards	Umpqua Valley AVA	1961	Oregon's oldest estate winery.
Honeywood Winery	Willamette Valley AVA	1934	Oldest continuously operating winery in Oregon.
Ponzi Vineyards	Laurelwood District AVA	1970	Dick and Nancy Ponzi are recognized as being among Oregon's winemaking pioneers and leaders.
Sokol Blosser Winery	Dundee Hills AVA	1971	One of the earliest Oregon wineries.
Willamette Valley Vineyards	Willamette Valley AVA	1983	Oregon's only publicly traded winery.

== See also ==
- Alcoholic beverages in Oregon
- Oregon Wine Board

== Further reading, by publication date ==
- Spectacular Wineries of Oregon: A Captivating Tour of Established, Estate, and Boutique Wineries, 2015, ISBN 978-0988614055
- Wine Map of the Pacific Northwest, 2015, ISBN 978-1936880133
- Explorer's Guide to Oregon Wine, 2013, ISBN 978-1581571714
- Winemakers of the Willamette Valley: Pioneering Vintners from Oregon's Wine Country, 2013, ISBN 978-1609496760
- The Law of Wine A Guide to Business and Legal Issues in Oregon, 2013
- Voodoo Vintners: Oregon's Astonishing Biodynamic Winegrowers, 2011, ISBN 978-0870716058
- Essential Wines and Wineries of the Pacific Northwest: A Guide to the Wine Countries of Washington, Oregon, British Columbia, and Idaho, 2010, ISBN 978-0881929669
- WineTrails of Oregon, 2009, ISBN 978-0979269813
- Oregon Eco-Friendly Wine: Leading the World in "Green" Wine, 2008, ISBN 978-9197532648
- Oregon: The Taste of Wine, 2008, ISBN 978-0882407463
- Pacific Pinot Noir: A Comprehensive Winery Guide for Consumers and Connoisseurs, 2008, ISBN 978-0520253179
- Cooking with the Wines of Oregon, 2007, ISBN 1-55285-843-X
- Grail, The: A year ambling & shambling through an Oregon vineyard in pursuit of the best pinot noir wine in the whole wild world, 2006, ISBN 978-0870710933
- At Home in the Vineyard: Cultivating a Winery, an Industry, and a Life, 2006, ISBN 978-0520256293
- Wines of the Pacific Northwest, 2006, ISBN 978-1840004199
- Oregon Wine Country, 2004, ISBN 1-4000-1367-4
- Oregon Viticulture, 2003, ISBN 978-0870715549
- A Travel Companion to the Wineries of the Pacific Northwest: Featuring the Pinot Noirs of Oregon's Willamette Valley, 2002, ISBN 0-9704154-3-5
- Boys Up North: Dick Erath and the Early Oregon Wine Makers, 1997, ISBN 978-0965608268
- Oregon Winegrape Grower's Guide, 1992, ISBN 978-0942367089
- The Wines and Wineries of America's Northwest: the Premium Wines of Oregon, Washington, and Idaho, 1986, ISBN 0-936666-03-X
