= Umpqua Valley AVA =

American Viticultural Area in northern Oregon

Coordinates: 43°16′44″N 123°29′42″W

Umpqua Valley
- Wine region
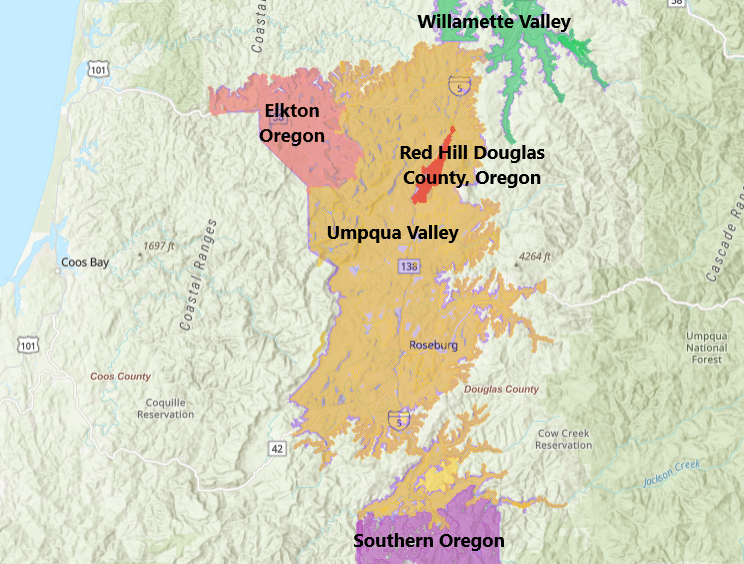
- Southern Oregon AVAs (North)
- Type: American Viticultural Area
- Year established: 1984
- Years of wine industry: 138
- Country: United States
- Part of: Oregon, Southern Oregon AVA, Douglas County
- Sub-regions: Red Hill Douglas County, Oregon AVA, Elkton Oregon AVA
- Growing season: 230 days
- Climate region: Region I
- Heat units: 2,380 GDD units
- Precipitation (annual average): 25 to 44 in (635–1,118 mm)
- Soil conditions: Basaltic origin, clayey and dark-colored in uplands; sedimentary soils from sandstone and mudstone dominate terraces and alluvial fans
- Total area: 768,000 acres (1,200 sq mi)
- Size of planted vineyards: 6,905 acres (2,794 ha)
- No. of vineyards: 70
- Grapes produced: Baco noir, Cabernet Franc, Cabernet Sauvignon, Chardonnay, Dolcetto, Grenache, Gewurztraminer, Grüner Veltliner, Malbec, Merlot, Muller Thurgau, Muscat Canelli, Pinot Blanc, Pinot Gris, Pinot Noir, Pinotage, Riesling, Sauvignon blanc, Semillon, Syrah, Tempranillo, Viognier
- No. of wineries: over 30

Umpqua Valley is an American Viticultural Area (AVA) located in the Umpqua River valley landform within Douglas County in Southern Oregon. The wine appellation was established as the nation's 63^{rd}, the state's third and the county’s initial AVA on March 29, 1984 by the Bureau of Alcohol, Tobacco and Firearms (ATF), Treasury after reviewing the petition submitted by David B. Adelsheim, Chairman of the Appellation Committee, Oregon Winegrowers Association, on behalf of local viticulturists, proposing a viticulture area within the State of Oregon, to be known as "Umpqua Valley."
The viticultural area encompasses approximately 768,000 acres (310,799 ha) cultivating, as of 2025, 4,000 acres (1,619 ha) on 70 vineyards with over 30 wineries in the area. It became a sub-appellation within the vast Southern Oregon AVA in 2004. Umpqua Valley itself currently encompasses two sub-appellations, Red Hill Douglas County and Elkton Oregon. Grapes produced in the area include Pinot Noir, Pinot Gris, Tempranillo, Cabernet Sauvignon, Chardonnay, Riesling and more.

== History ==
Umpqua (/ˈʌmpkwə/ UMP-kwah) is a historic name in the State of Oregon. The indigenous people in the Umpqua watershed consisted of several tribes, such as the Yoncalla band of the Kalapuya. These tribes witnessed much of the Great Flood of 1862, during which the Umpqua and other rivers rose to levels so high that even the oldest natives had never seen a greater flood.
The territorial legislature created an "Umpqua County" on January 24, 1851. It ceased to exist on October 16, 1862, as the area was merged into Douglas and Lane Counties. The Hudson's Bay Company had an establishment in the Umpqua Valley as early as 1832, probably on Calapooya Creek. It was generally called Old Fort Umpqua, and Umpqua City was established near Reedsport in 1830 but gradually died out by 1867. The present Umpqua Post Office is on the Umpqua River, near the mouth of Calapooya Creek. It was originally known as Umpqua Ferry when it was established in 1877.

The beginnings of viticulture in the Umpqua Valley are traced to Jesse Applegate who planted 40 acres (16 ha) of grapes in 1876 that were probably sold as table grapes. The Von Pessl brothers planted the first vinifera vines soon after, having brought cuttings from St. Helena and Lodi, California. The brothers grew Zinfandel, Riesling, and Sauvignon, made wine for home use, and also ran a distillery. Adam Doerner visited the Von Pessls in 1888, worked for the Beringers in St. Helena, then returned to the Umpqua Valley to grow Sauvignon and Riesling grapes. The winery he started continued to produce wine up until 1965, selling most to home winemakers during Prohibition, under Adam's son and grandson. Leon Adams, author of The Wines of America, called Richard Sommer the "father of Oregon's current wine industry," Adams' wrote, "Remembering what Dr. Amerine had taught, that the finest wine grapes in California are grown in the cooler districts, Sommer went where it is still cooler, to Oregon. He went north, testing the grapes in each locality. At Roseburg in the Umpqua Valley he found some Zinfandels in the 80-year-old Doerner's Winery vineyard that tested right. In 1961, he bought a hillside farm ten miles (16 km) west of Roseburg, planted vines from the Napa Valley and bonded his winery two years later." The first post-Prohibition estate winery in Oregon was established at HillCrest Vineyards in 1961, where the first Pinot Noir vines in Oregon were planted. The 22 years later, winegrape acreage in the Umpqua Valley has grown considerably. In the period between 1981 and 1983, vineyard acreage increased by about 201 acres (81 ha). This increase was about 151 percent in two years and shows that this area is a rapidly developing grape-growing area.
Contemporary attempts to define an "Umpqua Valley" viticultural area include the previously mentioned Oregon Liquor Control Commission-approved appellation and "Wine-Grape Adaptation to Oregon Climates" by Warren Aney in the Proceedings of the Oregon Horticultural Society, 1974. Mr. Aney used various climatological factors to isolate an oval-shaped area around Roseburg, 33 miles (53 km) wide and 70 miles (113 km) long, stretching from Elkton in the north to Canyonville in the south.

== Terroir ==
=== Topography ===
The Umpqua Valley viticultural area is basically the intermountain lowlands section of the Umpqua basin. It is bounded on the west and north by the Coast Range Mountains. The Klamath Mountains form the southern boundary and the Cascade Mountains the eastern. The area is separated from the Willamette Valley by an 800-foot (244 m) divide at the Douglas/Lane County line. In comparison, the surrounding area is generally steeper and more rugged. The 1,000-foot (305 m) contour line was chosen as the basic boundary of the viticultural area, according to the petitioner, because elevation seems to be a fairly reliable indicator of suitability for cultivation. At the 1,000-foot (305 m) level, low slopes turn into steep slopes and become less hospitable to horticulture. Above the 1,000-foot (305 m) contour line there is a noticeable difference in climate, soils, topography and vegetation. In addition, there are a few sections of the region below the 1,000-foot (305 m) elevation, particularly south of the Umpqua River between Elkton and Scottsburg, which contain no cultivable soils. These have been excluded from the proposed area. Similarly, in the Cascade foothills, the upper sections of the valleys of the North Umpqua River and Calapooya Creek have been excluded for lack of irrigable land.

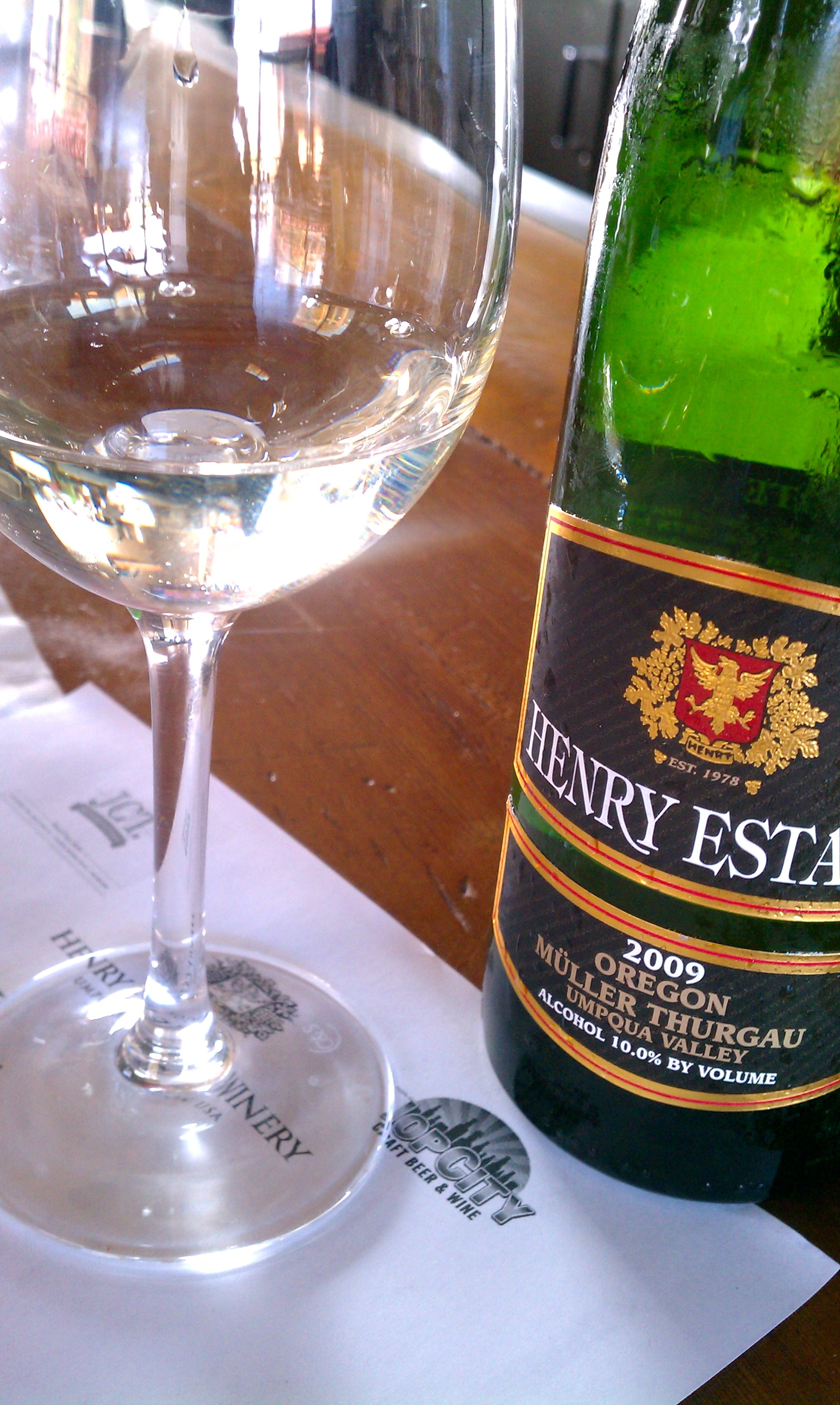
Muller-Thurgau wine from the Umpqua Valley

=== Climate ===
The climate of the Umpqua basin is characterized by cool winters, warm summers, and high annual precipitation with a definite summer deficiency. The mean January temperature at Roseburg is 41 °F (5 °C) and the July mean is 67 °F (19 °C). This area has slightly greater annual temperature ranges than the Willamette Valley to the north and the coastal areas to the west. The USDA plant hardiness zones are 8b and 9a.

=== Soils ===
The soil reflect the complex geology of the region. In the flood plains of the Umpqua River and its tributaries, there is much recent alluvial material which is slightly acidic and well- drained. The flood plains are intensively used for irrigated specialty crops, including grapes. In comparison, the surrounding area is not part of the flood plains and consequently its soil is quite different.

== Viticulture ==
In 1995 the first Tempranillo vines in Oregon were planted at Abacela resulting in the first 100% varietal Tempranillo wines in the Pacific Northwest. In 2006, the first commercial production of the newly recognized American varietal, Grüner Veltliner, occurred in Umpqua Valley by Reustle-Prayer Rock Vineyards.
