= Southern Oregon AVA =

American Viticultural Area in Southern Oregon

Coordinates: 42°26′01″N 123°05′30″W

Southern Oregon
- Wine region
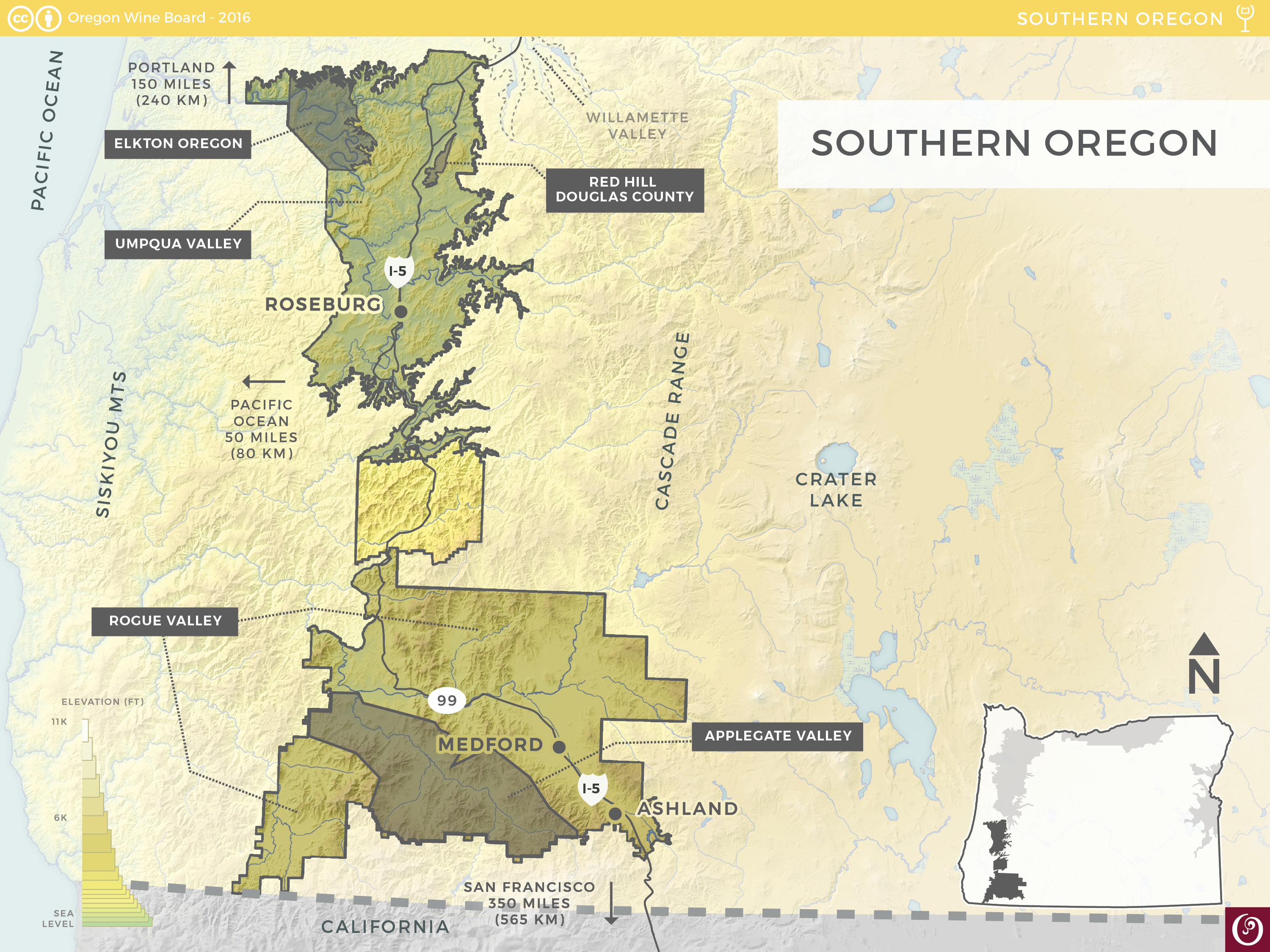
- Type: American Viticultural Area
- Year established: 2004
- Country: United States
- Part of: Oregon
- Sub-regions: Applegate Valley AVA, Elkton Oregon AVA, Red Hill Douglas County AVA, Rogue Valley AVA, Umpqua Valley AVA
- Growing season: 182 days
- Climate region: Region II
- Heat units: 2.508 GDD units
- Precipitation (annual average): 32–35 in (813–889 mm)
- Soil conditions: Sedimentary rock over crushed, metamorphosed and modified rock formations
- Total area: 2.0 million acres (3,125 sq mi)
- Size of planted vineyards: 3,000 acres (1,214 ha)
- No. of vineyards: 120
- Grapes produced: Albarino, Bastardo, Cabernet Franc, Cabernet Sauvignon, Chardonnay, Dolcetto, Grenache, Malbec, Merlot, Petit Verdot, Petite Sirah, Syrah, Tempranillo, Viognier
- No. of wineries: 17

Southern Oregon is an American Viticultural Area (AVA) located in Southern Oregon and, at the outset, encompassed two sub-appellations: the Rogue Valley AVA and the Umpqua Valley AVA. The wine appellation was established as the nation's 157^{th} and the state's ninth AVA on December 8, 2004 by the Alcohol and Tobacco Tax and Trade Bureau (TTB), Treasury after reviewing the petition submitted in 2002 by H. Earl Jones, a winemaker, and Dr. Gregory V. Jones, an associate professor of geography, proposing a viticultural area spanning across portions of Douglas, Jackson and Josephine Counties in the state's southwestern region named "Southern Oregon."

Southern Oregon AVA is the union of the Umpqua Valley AVA and the Rogue Valley AVA, and all land suitable for grape cultivation within the Southern Oregon is also located in one of these smaller appellations. A small strip of connecting territory is included in the Southern Oregon AVA to make it a contiguous region, however, this strip passes through mountainous regions not suitable for viticulture. The AVA lies entirely within the southwest corner of the state, south of Eugene and west of the Cascade Mountains, and consists of the river valleys of the Rogue and Umpqua Rivers and their tributaries.

Southern Oregon was established to allow the two principal winegrowing regions in the southern part of the state to market themselves jointly. This creation of a "super-AVA" is a departure from the trend in the Willamette Valley AVA in northern Oregon establishing smaller AVAs specific to a particular locale's climate or soil conditions. The plant hardiness zone range is 7b to 9a.

== Umpqua Valley AVA ==
The Umpqua Valley AVA contains the drainage basin of the Umpqua River, excluding mountainous regions. It has a warmer climate than the Willamette Valley, but cooler than the Rogue Valley to the south. Grapes grown here include Pinot Noir, with smaller amounts of Pinot Gris, Cabernet Sauvignon, Chardonnay, and Riesling, as well as several French-American hybrids.

=== Red Hill Douglas County, Oregon AVA ===
The Red Hill Douglas County, Oregon AVA is entirely contained within the Umpqua Valley AVA. This AVA expands 5,500 acres (9 sq mi), and is located near Yoncalla. Originally petitioned as the "Red Hill AVA", the proposed appellation brought protest from Willamette Valley vintners, where a region known as Red Hill is also located; the name of "Red Hill Douglas County" was instead chosen to avoid consumer confusion.
The Elkton AVA is entirely contained within the Umpqua Valley AVA. This AVA encompasses 74,900 acres (117 sq mi) and is located near Elkton.

== Rogue Valley AVA ==
The Rogue Valley AVA includes the drainage basin of the Rogue River and several tributaries, including the Illinois River, the Applegate River, and Bear Creek. Most wineries in the region are found in the valleys formed by one of these three tributaries, rather than along the Rogue River itself. The region is 70 miles (110 km) wide by 60 miles (97 km) long (though much of the land within the AVA is not suitable for grape cultivation); there are fewer than 20 wineries with only 1,100 acres (4.5 km^{2}) planted. Each river valley has a unique terroir, and grows different varieties of grapes. Overall, however, this region is the warmest and driest of Oregon's winegrowing regions.

=== Illinois Valley ===
The westernmost tributary is the Illinois River, which rises in southern Josephine County, in the Red Buttes Wilderness. The river flows generally northwest along the west side of the Klamath Mountains, past Cave Junction and Kerby then through the Siskiyou National Forest. It joins the Rogue River from the south on the Curry–Josephine county line, approximately 15 miles (24 km) from the Pacific Ocean. The region is marked by its high elevation and is significantly influenced by marine climates. The region is well suited for growing Burgundy varietals, similar to those grown in the Willamette Valley.

=== Applegate Valley AVA ===
The Applegate Valley AVA, established in 2000, is the only sub-AVA in the Rogue Valley AVA. The Applegate River flows through the town of Applegate and near the city of Jacksonville, the location of Oregon's first winery (which has been restored and reopened as Valley View Winery). This region contains vineyards at altitudes ranging from 1,000 feet (300 m) to 1,500 feet (500 m) above sea level, and is warmer and drier than the Illinois Valley to the west, but less so than the Bear Creek Valley to the east. Grapes that thrive here include Merlot, Cabernet Sauvignon, Syrah, Chardonnay and Zinfandel, with Cabernet and Merlot being the dominant varietals.

=== Bear Creek Valley ===
Bear Creek is the most populated of the Rogue River tributaries, as it flows through the cities of Medford and Ashland. Here, the valley floor is 2,000 feet (610 m) above sea level, and the climate is warm and dry. The climate of the Bear Creek Valley is similar to that of Bordeaux, and it is well suited for cultivating varietals such as Cabernet Sauvignon, Merlot, Chardonnay, Cabernet Franc, Pinot gris, Sauvignon blanc, Malbec and Syrah.

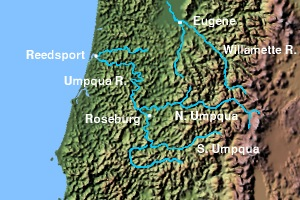
Umpqua River and tributaries

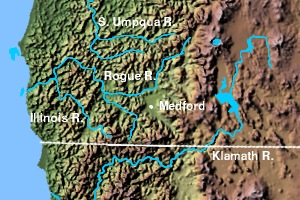
Rogue River and tributaries. The unlabeled eastern stream of the Illinois River is the Applegate River; Bear Creek is not shown but flows through the valley thru Medford

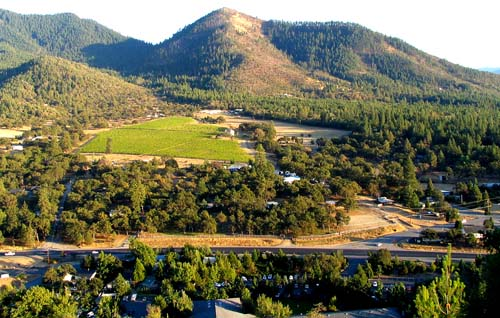
Applegate Valley hillside vineyard
