= Mr. Applegate =

Mr. Applegate may also refer to:

- Mr. Applegate, a character in Damn Yankees
- Mr. Applegate, a character in The Muppet Christmas Carol

== See also ==
- Applegate (disambiguation)
