= Applegate Valley AVA =

American Viticultural Area in Oregon

Coordinates: 42°13′31″N 123°02′51″W

Applegate Valley
- Wine region
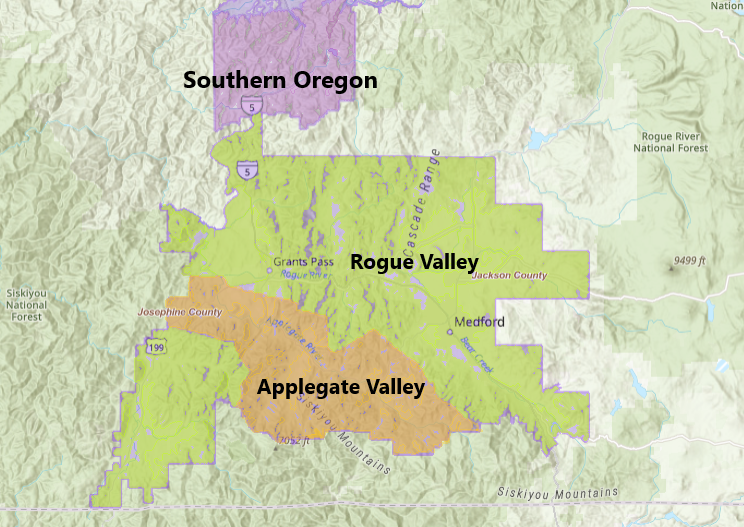
- Southern Oregon AVAs (South)
- Type: American Viticultural Area
- Year established: 2000
- Years of wine industry: 156
- Country: United States
- Part of: Oregon, Southern Oregon AVA, Rogue Valley AVA
- Growing season: 145 days
- Climate region: Region II
- Heat units: 2,400-2,700 GDD units
- Precipitation (annual average): 25.2 in (640 mm)
- Total area: 275,000 acres (430 sq mi)
- Size of planted vineyards: 340 acres (138 ha)
- No. of vineyards: 4
- Grapes produced: Cabernet Franc, Cabernet Sauvignon, Chardonnay, Merlot, Riesling, Syrah, Tannat, Tempranillo, Vermentino, Zinfandel
- No. of wineries: 16

Applegate Valley is an American Viticultural Area (AVA) located in the valley landform of the Applegate River in Jackson and Josephine Counties within Southern Oregon. The valley's namesake is the river which flows through the town of Applegate and near the city of Jacksonville. The wine appellation was established as the nation's 138^{th}, the state's sixth and both counties' second AVA on December 24, 2000 by the Bureau of Alcohol, Tobacco and Firearms (ATF), Treasury after reviewing the petition submitted by Mr. Barnard E. Smith, President, The Academy of Wine of Oregon Inc., on behalf of local viticulturists, proposing a viticulture area within the State of Oregon, to be known as "Applegate Valley."

The viticultural area lies entirely within the Rogue Valley AVA, established in 1991, and both became sub-appellations within the vast Southern Oregon AVA in 2004. One of Oregon's first wineries, restored and re-opened as Valley View Winery, was established in the Applegate Valley. This region contains vineyards at elevations between 1,000 and 1,500 feet (305 and 457 m) above sea level, and is warmer and drier than the Illinois Valley to the west, but less so than the Bear Creek Valley to the east.
At the outset, there were 23 vineyards in the valley, four bonded wineries and 235 acres (95 ha) of cultivation in the area. Grapes that thrive here include Tempranillo, Merlot, Cabernet Franc, Cabernet Sauvignon, Syrah, Tannat, Vermentino, Chardonnay and Zinfandel.

== History ==
The Applegate River was named for one or more of the Applegate brothers who explored the area in 1846. Peter Britt, who emigrated from Switzerland to Highland, Illinois in 1845, journeyed to Portland, Oregon by wagon train via the Oregon Trail in 1852. He then headed south to what would become Jacksonville in the Rogue Valley, drawn by a gold rush which began in 1851. Initially, he made money from gold mining and mule packing, but soon gave it up to his previous vocations of photography and horticulture. He established the Pacific Northwest’s first commercial winery, Valley View Vineyards in 1854, eventually making Jacksonville a wine making center. By 1880, Britt produced 1,000 to 3,000 US gallons (3.8 to 11.4 kl) per year, and fulfilling orders from as far away as Wyoming. Considered the father of the Southern Oregon fruit industry, Britt also produced and sold honey, pears, peaches, and apples, as well as grapes. He developed a formal irrigation system on his property as early as 1855, and used smudging to prevent frost damage. Britt continued selling grapes and wine until his death in 1905. Viticulture in Applegate Valley grew when A. H. Carson began planting some 30 acres (12 ha) of grapes along North Applegate Road in 1870. Oregon enacted Prohibition in 1916 four years before the Eighteenth Amendment ratified it nationally shutting down the local viticulture industry until 1972, when Frank Wisnovsky reestablished Valley View Vineyards in Ruch.

== Terroir ==
=== Topography ===
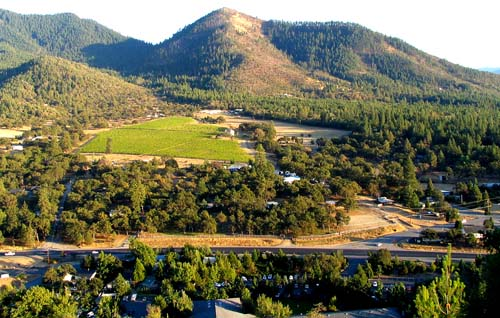
Applegate Valley hillside vineyards near the town of Ruch

The Rogue Valley viticultural area has three distinct subregions: Applegate Valley and two other valleys that have not been designated as AVAs, Illinois Valley and Bear Creek Valley. The Illinois Valley lies to the west of the Applegate Valley and Bear Creek Valley lies directly to the east of the AVA. The Applegate Valley is approximately 50 miles (80 km) long, running from its southeast origins near the California border, in a generally northwest direction, to where it joins the Rogue River, just west of Grants Pass. Applegate Valley is surrounded by the Siskiyou Mountains, believed to have been created in the Jurassic period by upthrusts of the ocean floor as a plate forced its way under the continental shelf. To Applegate Valley's east and south is the Rogue River National Forest. To its west is the Siskiyou National Forest. Both of the National Forests' boundaries have been identified by the U.S. Forest Service and were used to identify the boundaries of the Applegate Valley AVA where appropriate. A portion of the western boundaries, and most of the northern boundaries, are established by straight-line segments drawn between prominent physical features of the terrain, mostly mountaintops. A small portion of the valley, located within California, is excluded in this petition. Locally, this area is called Elliot Creek, a tributary to the Applegate River. Some areas included within the boundaries of the proposed viticultural area are presently viewed as unsuitable to viticulture, primarily due to elevation. These have been included because future viticultural practices, such as site orientation and frost protection could make grape growing feasible.

=== Climate ===
The natural geographic boundaries of the Applegate Valley provide for its distinct climate in terms of rainfall, degree-days and temperature. Specifically, the Siskiyou Mountains separate the Applegate Valley's western side from the Illinois Valley and its eastern side from Bear Creek Valley. This further accentuates climatic differences between the three valleys, coupled with a lessening of the marine influence, when moving from a west to east direction. According to The Oregon Winegrape Growers' Guide, "As one moves from west to east, or from the Illinois River Valley including Selma to the Applegate Valley and into the Rogue Valley, good grape-growing sites generally become warmer due to the lessening of the marine air influence." The Oregon Winegrape Growers' Guide goes on to point out that earlier ripening varieties such.as Pinot noir, Early Muscat, and Gewurztraminer, do well in the Illinois Valley. In contrast, the Applegate Valley with its Region II temperature range can ripen Cabernet Sauvignon, Merlot, and Chardonnay two to three weeks earlier than is possible in the Illinois Valley. As mentioned earlier, Applegate Valley AVA is located in Jackson and Josephine Counties. The USDA Natural Resources Conservation Service, National Water and Climate Center, has climate data for Jackson and Josephine Counties available from the USDA web site. Temperature and precipitation differences in Applegate Valley and surrounding areas are illustrated by the data collected during 1961 through 1990 at five weather stations. The Ruch weather station is located inside the Applegate Valley AVA boundaries and data from that site is used to approximate the climate conditions of this viticultural area. The four other weather stations located outside the AVA, are: (1) Cave Junction, located in the Illinois Valley, in Josephine County, which is in close proximity to the AVA's southwest boundaries; (2) Grants Pass, in Josephine County, which is in close proximity the AVA's northwest boundaries; (3) Medford, located in the Bear Creek Valley in Jackson County, which is in close proximity to the AVA's northeast boundaries; and (4) Ashland, also in Jackson County, which is in close proximity to the AVA's southeast boundaries. Climatological statistics are as follows: Cave Junction (Illinois Valley) has an average annual precipitation of 59.57 inches (1,513 mm). Average annual precipitation declines steadily, when proceeding in a generally eastern direction: starting with Grants Pass at 30.89 inches (785 mm), into Applegate Valley at Ruch with 26.01 inches (661 mm), then Medford, in Bear Creek Valley, with 20.56 inches (522 mm) and finally, Ashland reporting 19.26 inches (489 mm). This illustrates the following precipitation differences when comparing each of the four weather sites with the Ruch (Applegate Valley) site: Cave Junction had the highest precipitation with 33.56 inches (852 mm) more than Ruch; Grants Pass had 4.9 inches (124 mm) more; Medford had 5.5 inches (140 mm) less; and Ashland with 6.8 inches (173 mm) less than Ruch. This shows that Applegate Valley has a distinct and measurable climatic difference from its surrounding areas in terms of average annual precipitation. The growing degree-days records (from the same source as the precipitation records presented above) provide another climatic difference between the Applegate Valley and the surrounding areas. A growing degree-day is defined as a unit of heat available for plant growth. It is calculated by taking the average daily temperature (adding the maximum and minimum daily temperatures, then dividing by two) and subtracting the temperature below which growth is minimal for the principal crops in the area. The temperature threshold used for determining minimal growth was 40 °F (4 °C). The temperature data places the average yearly degree-days at the Ruch site (Applegate Valley) at 5108. The average yearly degree-days, beginning with the stations outside of the Applegate Valley boundaries are as follows: Southwest at Cave Junction (Illinois Valley) registers 5008 degree-days; northwest at Grants Pass reported 5689; northeast at Medford (Bear Creek Valley) measured 5086, and southeast at Ashland had 4836. In comparing the degree-days of Ruch (Applegate Valley) with the four others, it is clear that a measurable difference in degree-days exists between Applegate Valley and the surrounding areas: The largest temperature variation was at Grants Pass, which had 583 more degree-days than Applegate Valley, and the smallest difference was at Medford (Bear Creek Valley), which had 20 degree-days less than Applegate Valley. The plant hardiness zone range is 7b to 8b.

=== Soils ===
The petitioner submitted a soil analysis listing the principal soil series from Applegate Valley, Bear Creek Valley and Illinois Valley vineyards. As indicated earlier, these three subregions are located in the Rogue Valley viticultural area. The principal soil series from vineyards located in each of these subregions are: (1) Applegate Valley: Central Point, Cove, Kerby, Manita, Ruch and Shefflein; (2) Bear Creek Valley: Agate-Winlow Complex, Brockman, Carney, Central Point, Coleman, Darrow, Evans, Holland, Medford, Provig-Agate Complex, Ruch, Selmac, Shefflein, Vannoy and Wapato; (3) Illinois Valley: Brockman, Cornutt-Dubakella Complex, Foehlin, Kerby, Pollard and Takilma.
Based on this soil analysis, the Applegate Valley and Bear Creek Valley vineyards have three principal soil series in common: Central Point, Ruch and Shefflein. It is also apparent that Illinois Valley and Applegate Valley vineyards have one principal soil series in common, Kerby. Soil types in the Applegate Valley are generally granite in origin as opposed to the volcanic origin of the Cascade Mountains to the east. Most of the Applegate Valley vineyards are planted on stream terraces or alluvial fans providing deep well-drained soils. The leaching of the more basic soil components found in the Illinois Valley have left the soil slightly more acidic than the soils in the Applegate Valley. The soils to the east of Applegate Valley near Bear Creek Valley tend to be less acidic than the soils in the Applegate Valley. Applegate Valley soils have a pH of between 6.1 and 6.5. In The Oregon Winegrape Growers' Guide, Ken Browning writes that a pH of 6.0 to 6.5 is ideal for desirable microbiological activity, nutrient availability, and nutrient balance.

== Viticulture ==
The Willamette Valley and the Umpqua Valley are known for cool region grapes, including Pinot noir, Pinot Gris and Reisling. These require less than 2500 degree days to ripen, Winkler's Climate Region I. In contrast, varieties such as Cabernet Sauvignon, Merlot, Zinfandel and Syrah all grown in the Applegate Valley require 2500 to 3000 degree days (Climate Region II). With 2680 degree days, Grants Pass is more similar in climate to areas of the Sonoma and Napa valleys than to the climate of northern Oregon. Applegate Valley vineyards are planted to Bordelaise varieties such as Merlot, Cabernet Sauvignon, Syrah, Chardonnay and Zinfandel.
