= Red Hill Douglas County AVA =

American Viticultural Area in Douglas County, Oregon

Coordinates: 43°29′19″N 123°17′27″W

Red Hill Douglas County, Oregon
- Wine region
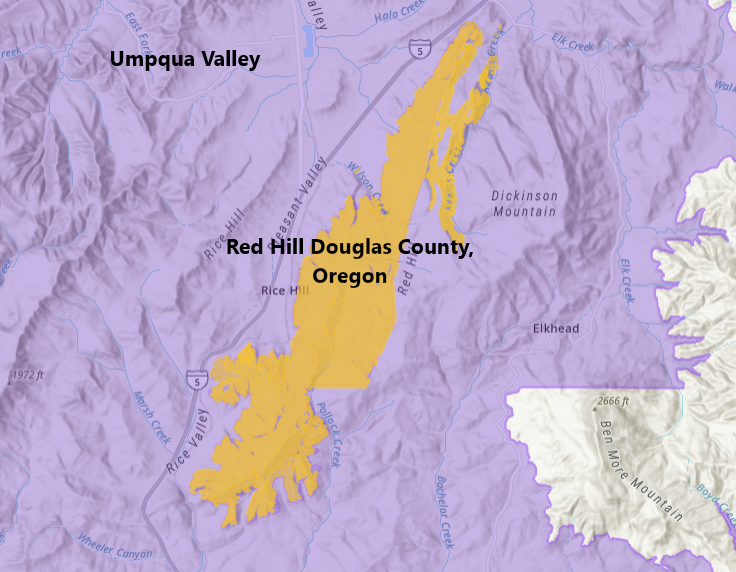
- Type: American Viticultural Area
- Year established: 2005
- Years of wine industry: 57
- Country: United States
- Part of: Oregon, Southern Oregon AVA, Douglas County, Umpqua Valley AVA
- Other regions in Oregon, Southern Oregon AVA, Douglas County, Umpqua Valley AVA: Elkton Oregon AVA
- Growing season: 170 days
- Precipitation (annual average): 51.53 inches (1,309 mm)
- Soil conditions: Reddish soil is composed of silt-sized volcanic ash
- Total area: 5,500 acres (9 sq mi)
- Size of planted vineyards: 450 acres (182 ha)
- No. of vineyards: 1
- Grapes produced: Baco Noir, Chardonnay, Gewürztraminer, Muscat, Pinot Blanc, Pinot Gris, Pinot Noir, Riesling, Syrah, Tempranillo, Zinfandel
- No. of wineries: 0

Red Hill Douglas County, Oregon is an American Viticultural Area (AVA) located in northeastern Douglas County of Southern Oregon, near the town of Yoncalla. It lies entirely within the other county appellation, Umpqua Valley, which itself is a sub-appelletion in the multi-county Southern Oregon AVA. It was established as the nation's 167th, the state's thirteenth and the county's fourth appellation on October 14, 2005, by the Alcohol and Tobacco Tax and Trade Bureau (TTB), Treasury after reviewing the petition submitted in 2002 by Mr. Wayne Hitchings, the sole vineyard owner in the locale, proposing a viticultural area named “Red Hill."

Originally petitioned in 2002 as the "Red Hill," the proposed appellation name was protested by vintners in the older Willamette Valley AVA where a region known as Red Hill is also located. Opposing commenters also expressed concern about the proposed "Red Hill (Oregon)"’ name. They cited consumer confusion with other "Red Hill" wine regions in Oregon, California, New Zealand, and Australia. In California, an AVA was officially designated in 2004 as Red Hills Lake County AVA. Consequently, the name "Red Hill Douglas County, Oregon" was designated by the TTB to uniquely identify the appellation. The USDA plant hardiness zones are 8b and 9a.

== History ==
The name "Red Hill" was common in the mid-19th century. Two prominent pioneer families, Scotts and Applegates, settled the valleys that spread from this prominent elongated hill two miles (3 km) southeast of the town of Yoncalla, Oregon. The name is derived from its volcanic soil color which is exclusive in this area due to its geological structure. By 1847 both Applegate and Scott had land claims nearby. By 1850 with Congress passing the Donation Land Claim Act and the large influx of settlers, quality agricultural lands were receiving Patents or new filings. With the rapid settlement much of the quality land was taken by the time of Statehood, including the settlements on Red Hill. By 1879 Red Hill had established its own school district and constructed a school house at mile 2.25 on Red Hill Road. This can be located on a copy of U.S.G.S. map, Drain, Oregon, scale 1:62,500, dated 1956. The school appears on Red Hill Road as abandoned. This school district operated until 1943 when it consolidated with the Pleasant Valley District. In 1969 seven and a half acres (3 ha) of varietal grape vineyards were first planted on a southern exposure slope on Red Hill. This was immediately followed by another land owner planting four acres (2 ha) of wine grapes in 1970. Subsequent plantings were added with the 2002 vineyard acreage reaching 161 acres (65 ha) with future plantings planned.

== Terroir ==
=== Topography ===
Red Hill region is distinct from the surrounding areas in soil, rainfall, and temperatures. Also, they stated that the geology and higher elevations on the hillsides are unique to the surrounding lower elevations. The Red Hill terrain above the 1,200-foot (366 m) elevation line and on the east side of the hill, located outside the proposed boundary line, is not conducive to successful viticulture. A supporting Corvallis, Oregon, vineyard owner stated that east-facing slopes make poor vineyard sites. An Oakland, Oregon, supporting commenter stated that the viticultural area has cool night temperatures, as compared to areas outside the proposed boundary, and enjoys a frost-free growing season. The same commenter noted that the reddish Jory soils are isolated on Red Hill from the surrounding region. A supporting Medford, Oregon, horticultural advisor commented that the reddish soil is composed of silt-sized volcanic ash deposited by wind on the hilltops, not in the valleys. The commenter also stated that the marine influence provides a cooler and wetter climate, as compared to the surrounding Umpqua Valley area. The horticultural advisor stated his belief that the Red Hill area is unique to the region and deserves its own appellation. A supporting Douglas County extension agent commented that the majority of the County grapes grow between 400 and 800 feet (120 and 240 m) in elevation and that the elevation level of between approximately 800 and 1,200 feet (240 and 370 m) of the Red Hill viticultural area is the maximum elevation for successful ripening of grapes in the Umpqua climatic zone. The extension agent explained that increased winter and spring rainfall levels in the Red Hill region contrast to the rainfall of the adjacent lower elevation valley vineyard sites and that Red Hill has a very distinctive Jory soil type. A supporting general manager of the Douglas County Farmers Co-op commented that unique characteristics of Red Hill include the soils, microclimate, and rainfall. The general manager also states that viticulture occurs at higher elevations than those of most other Douglas County grape-growing locations.

=== Climate ===
The Umpqua Valley and Douglas County regional climate is largely affected by the Pacific Ocean’s coastal weather systems 50 miles (80 km) to the west. These storm systems are buffered by the Callahans, a group of mountains running north and south in the Coast Range. The result is a moderate winter climate in the viticultural area. During the summers, numerous Pacific highs replace the winter storm patterns with warm, dry weather. These climate changes typically occur in May and November. Temperatures throughout the larger Umpqua Valley viticultural area differ greatly, creating numerous microclimates. In the Red Hill area, a portion of the Umpqua Valley viticultural area, daytime growing temperatures are moderated by elevation and surrounding terrain, in comparison to lower valley elevations that experience warmer daytime temperatures as high as 105 °F (41 °C). Red Hill's average daytime temperature during the growing season is 75 °F (24 °C). Temperature recordings at Oakland, Sutherlin and Roseburg all located along Interstate 5 in Douglas County, can increase as much as 11 °F (−12 °C) from Red Hill daytime temperatures. Nighttime Red Hill temperatures are typically 7 °F (−14 °C) lower than those in the surrounding areas during the summer months. Growing season temperature data, collected between 1998 and 2000, came from the areas of Red Hill and from the Roseburg Regional Airport, which is located twenty miles (32 km) south of Red Hill. During this 3-year collection period, the average high was 74.5 °F (23.6 °C) for Roseburg and 72.3 °F (22.4 °C) for Red Hill. The average low was 50 °F (10 °C) for Roseburg and 46.4 °F (8.0 °C) for Red Hill. The Red Hill microclimate is one of a large number of different climates within a relatively short distance. The climate changes are primarily caused by associated landforms and elevation differences. Within the elevation range of the viticultural area, the geographical landform provides cold air drainage that maintains frost-free grape-growing seasons. The nearby vineyards on the valley floor, without the benefit of the vertical cold air drainage, have frequent frosts. The Red Hill microclimate also includes occasional fog in winter and summer. The fog can be extreme, completely covering the valley's floor, while Red Hill enjoys full sun. This fog condition can also reverse itself, with Red Hill being totally blanketed in fog, while the valley floor enjoys fog-free visibility.

Elevations of the proposed viticultural area are generally at or above 800 feet (244 m), with most of the terrain below 1,200 feet (366 m). This span of elevations has a significant effect on growing conditions. The hillside climate allows grapes to mature at a slower rate, producing small clusters of grapes with high acids and intense flavors. In his March 2, 2001, letter, Jerry Maul explained that the Red Hill bloom and ripening dates may be 12 days later than the rest of the Umpqua Valley viticultural area and 4 to 7 days ahead of those of comparable varieties in the Willamette Valley viticultural area. Mr. Maul also stated that the Willamette Valley viticultural area has 10 inches (254 mm) more annual rain than the viticultural area. Average rainfall in the Red Hill area is 51.53 inches (1,309 mm) at the 1,000-foot (305 m) elevation, which contrasts with 40 inches (1,016 mm) at the 600-foot (183 m) elevation of the Umpqua Valley floor. Other areas close to Red Hill all have significantly less rainfall.

=== Soils ===
Red Hill is geologically part of the Umpqua Formation, with numerous rising domes that present an undulating appearance. The landform is composed of basalts similar to the volcanic rocks on the Pacific Ocean floor. The Jory series, which predominates the area, includes the deepest soils and forms a uniform reservoir of texture and depth across the viticultural area. Jory soil is found at 1,900 feet (579 m) to the north and 1,900 feet (579 m) to the west of the southwest corner of section 34, T23S and R5W. A soil analysis of the Jory soil in this area segregates it into six sections when taken to a depth of 60 inches (152 cm). The first two sections, 0 to 8 inches (0–20 cm) and 8 to 16 inches (20–41 cm), are moderately acidic, silty clay loam of a reddish brown color. The third through the sixth sections, 16 to 24 inches (41–61 cm), 24 to 33 inches (61–84 cm), 33 to 48 inches (84–122 cm), and 48 to 60 inches (122–152 cm), respectively, are all strongly acidic. The third section is dark reddish brown in color, and the fourth through sixth sections are dark red. Bedrock is found at 60 inches (152 cm) or deeper. Mr. Jerry Maul, a former Douglas County extension agent, wrote in a letter dated March 2, 2001, about the appellation status of the Red Hill region of Douglas County. He stated that Jory soils found at Red Hill and in other regions of Oregon are accepted as the premier soils in the production of wine grapes. To some extent, these soils can be found to the north at Dundee Hills AVA, and in the foothills west of Corvallis, Oregon. Mr. Walt Barton, an engineering technician for the Douglas Soil and Water Conservation District, stated in his March 7, 2001, letter, "this soil [Jory series] in Douglas County is unique to the Red Hill District. In contrast, the soils in the surrounding area [Umpqua Valley] are shallow or poorly drained and are formed from sedimentary rock." He also stated that the Jory series is deep, well drained, and derived from bedrock. Appearing less often on Red Hill, and mixed within the Jory series, are the Nekia, Philomath, and Dixonville series. Like the Jory, these series are formed in residual soil material from weathered basalt and possess similar reddish soil color and drainage characteristics. The noticeable difference is found in the depth of the soils, with the Jory at 5 to 15 feet (152 to 457 cm) in depth and the other series between 3 and 8 feet (91–244 cm). These well-drained soils change in structure and depth below the 800-foot (244 m) elevation line, delineating Red Hill on the western and southern flanks, with sedimentary rocks at the base.

== Viticulture ==
The AVA is the home to a single vineyard, the Red Hill Vineyard, founded by Wayne Hitchings in 1991 and as of 2005 cultivated 194 acres (79 ha). Hitchings died on September 5, 2016, after growing the vineyard to yield 450 acres (182 ha). Fruit from Red Hill Vineyard continues to be sold to winemakers throughout the region.

The 2011 Art Brut Outsider Cuvée, a sparkling wine by Roots Wine Company that contains Red Hill Pinot Noir and Chardonnay, was a featured selection by Oregon Wine Club Cellar 503 in February 2016.
