= Elkton Oregon AVA =

American Viticultural Area in southern Oregon

Coordinates: 45°15′31″N 123°02′38″W

Elkton Oregon
- Wine region
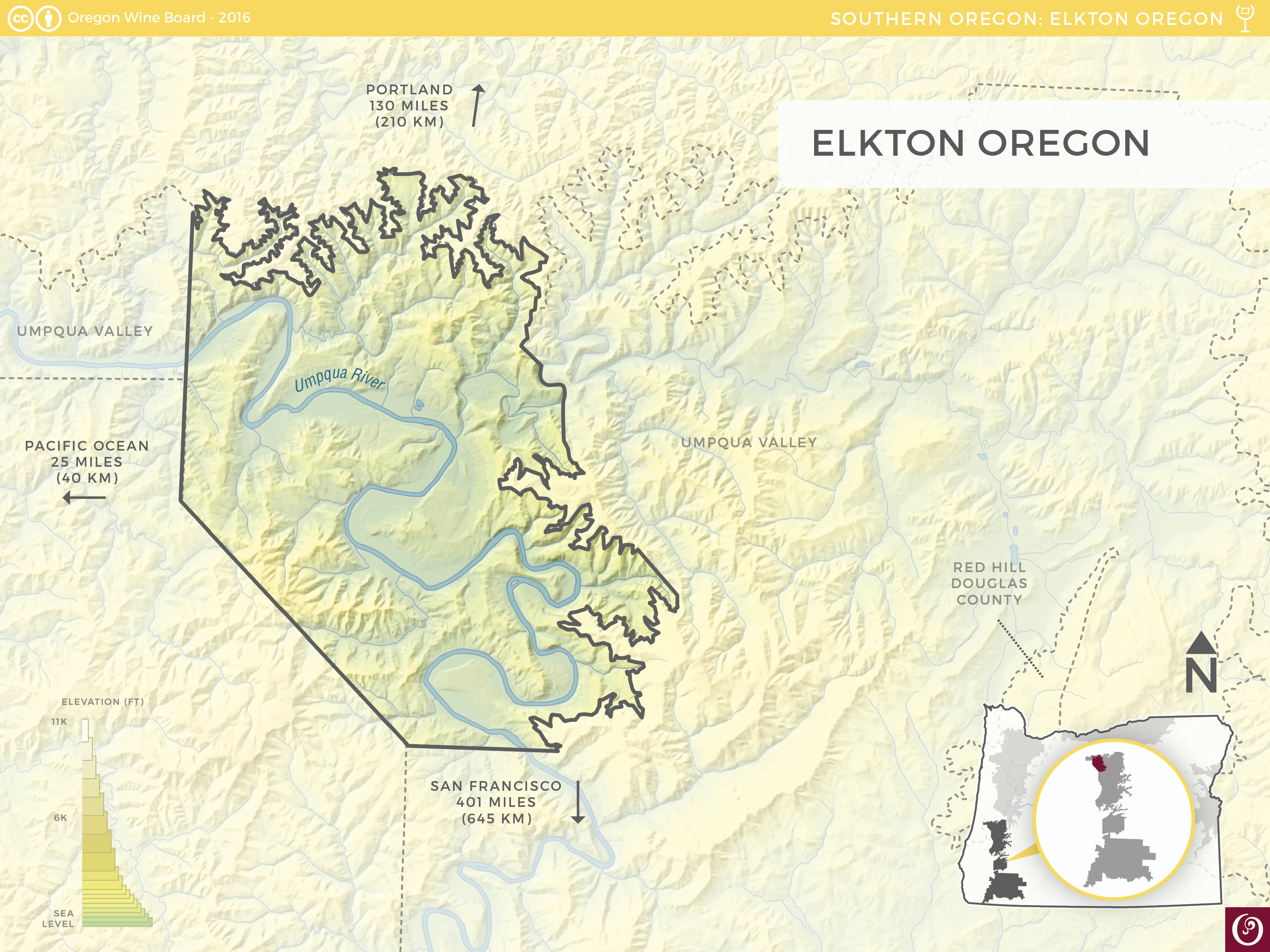
- Other names: Elkton OR
- Type: American Viticultural Area
- Year established: 2013
- Years of wine industry: 54
- Country: United States
- Part of: Oregon, Southern Oregon AVA, Douglas County, Umpqua Valley AVA
- Other regions in Oregon, Southern Oregon AVA, Douglas County, Umpqua Valley AVA: Red Hill Douglas County, Oregon AVA
- Growing season: 220 days
- Climate region: Region Ib
- Heat units: 2,436 GDD units
- Precipitation (annual average): 52.5 inches (1,334 mm)
- Soil conditions: Predominately residual clay and/or silt loam or small to large cobble-dominated alluvial deposits
- Total area: 74,900 acres (117 sq mi)
- Size of planted vineyards: 305 acres (123 ha)
- No. of vineyards: 12
- Varietals produced: Gewürztraminer, Pinot Gris, Pinot Noir, Riesling
- No. of wineries: 7

Elkton Oregon is an American Viticultural Area (AVA) within Douglas County in Southern Oregon encompassing the small town of Elkton, Oregon. It was established as the nation's 207^{th}, the state's seventeenth and the county's fifth appellation on February 5, 2013 by the Alcohol and Tobacco Tax and Trade Bureau (TTB), Treasury after reviewing the petition submitted in 2002 by Michael Landt, vineyard owner, on behalf of himself and the owners of seven other Elkton area vineyards, proposing the Douglas County viticultural area in southwestern Oregon named ”Elkton Oregon.”

The TTB determined in the final ruling that the abbreviated name "Elkton OR" for the AVA is appropriate. The 74,900-acre (117 sq mi) viticultural area, as per the petition, cultivates 96.5 acres (39 ha) with 12 commercially-producing vineyards. Elkton Oregon is a sub-appellation within the larger Umpqua Valley and vast Southern Oregon viticultural areas and is warmer than the northern Oregon appellations. Elkton Oregon's acreage covers approximately 11 percent of the 689,904-acre (1,078 sq mi) Umpqua Valley and 0.04 percent of the 2.0-million-acre (3,125 sq mi) Southern Oregon. The marine influence from the Pacific Ocean distinguishes the Elkton Oregon viticultural area from the larger Umpqua Valley. The USDA plant hardiness zones are 8b and 9a.

== History ==
Elkton is situated 33 miles (53 km) from the Pacific Ocean and was one of the first cities established in Oregon, by virtue of two circumstances. It sat astride the mule train path between the tidewaters of the Umpqua River, where supplies were off-loaded from ships, and gold mines established in the interior in the 1850s. Elkton was also the site of the southern-most Hudson's Bay Trading Company fur-trading post, Fort Umpqua (1836-1851), and some settlement activity accompanied the fort. Though the city was and remains small, its long history has firmly associated the name with the area. For a brief time in the 1850s, Elkton was the county seat located at the mouth of Elk Creek where it enters the Umpqua River and rises in the hills above the town of Yoncalla at the northern tip of Elkton Oregon's neighboring AVA, Red Hill Douglas County. Much of the city's history is linked to the river, which provided motive force for early mills but flooded the town several times. Thus the name "Elkton" is well-known and readily identifiable. Winegrowing in Elkton dates back to the early 1970s when Ken Thomason began planting cool climate whites and Pinot noir. The first winery was established in 2000. Currently, there are seven licensed wineries and 12 commercial vineyards cultivating 305 acres (123 ha).

== Terroir ==
=== Topography ===
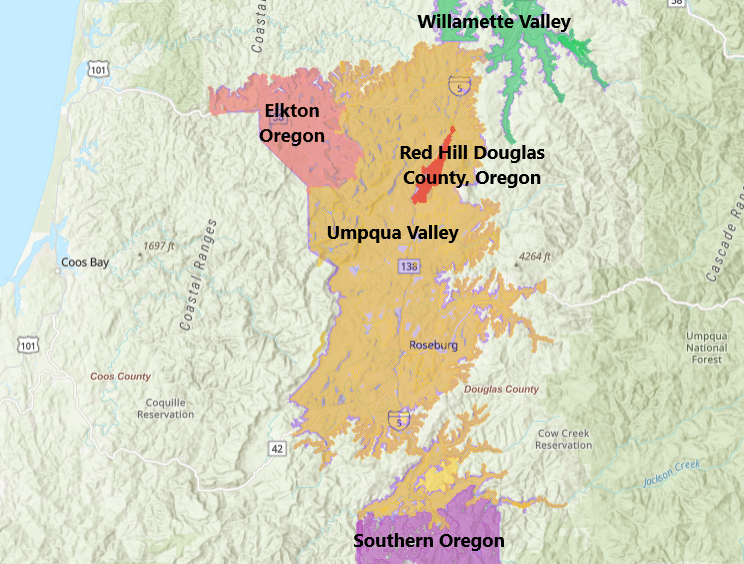
Southern Oregon AVAs (North)

The Elkton Oregon viticultural area is a steep-sided basin, consisting of low-lying, relatively flat river bottom lands that quickly rise to steep slopes. The Umpqua River enters from the south, through a gap in the mountain range near the town of Kellogg, and exits through a similar gap in the northwest corner of the viticultural area. The terrain of the viticultural area is most notably marked by the broad turns of the Umpqua River. Along these river bends are river terraces and foothills with lower elevations and gentle slopes with grades of 2 to 12 percent, in addition to wide swaths of relatively flat river bottom land. Elk Creek, which is also bordered by river terraces and river bottom land, flows from east to west through the northeastern portion of the viticultural area, joining with the Umpqua River near the town of Elkton. The flat river bottom land and gentle river terraces of the Umpqua River form the bottom of the basin. Above the river terraces and river bottom lands, the terrain quickly rises to steep, rugged hills with higher elevations, forming the sides of the basin, with the 1,000-foot (305 m) elevation contour forming the rim. The 1,000-foot (305 m) elevation contour was chosen as the boundary line for the viticultural area because above 1,000 feet (305 m) the land becomes too steep and rugged for vineyards. Elevations within the Elkton Oregon viticultural area vary from approximately 122 feet (37 m) in elevation along the Umpqua River to a peak at the 1,754-foot (535 m) elevation in the southwestern portion of the viticultural area near Heddin Creek. The basin-like shape of the viticultural area, along with the Umpqua River, contributes to the distinctive climate of the viticultural area. Cool, moist air travels east from the Pacific Ocean along the Umpqua River and into the Elkton area, bringing mild growing season temperatures, summer breezes, and rain. The steep slopes to the north, east, and south of the Elkton Oregon viticultural area trap most of the cool air and precipitation within the lower elevations of the basin, preventing much of the marine influence from traveling farther into the Umpqua Valley viticultural area. As a result, the remainder of the Umpqua Valley viticultural area is warmer and drier than the Elkton viticultural area. All of the vineyards within the Elkton Oregon viticultural area are located on the gentle river terraces and foothills along the Umpqua River and , at elevations of 140 to 1,000 feet (43–305 m).

In discussions with TTB, the petitioner stated that river terraces and foothills are preferable to river bottom lands because the river bottom lands have thick layers of topsoil which allows vines to grow too vigorously, requiring special cultivation techniques in order to create a favorable foliage-to-fruit ratio. The terraces and foothills, by contrast, are less fertile, with a thinner layer of topsoil over gravel. As a result, the vines require less extensive pruning to produce the desired foliage-to-fruit ratio. The area to the west of the Elkton Oregon viticultural area is desolate, heavily forested, and rugged. In this region, the Umpqua River is closely bound by the rugged terrain, with little to none of the open river bottom land or gentle river terraces and foothills found within the viticultural area, until the river reaches the ocean, according to USGS maps. Elevations to the west rise to 1,410 feet (430 m) along ridge lines and dip to 40 feet (12 m) along the Umpqua River as it flows toward the Pacific Ocean. To the north of the viticultural area, the elevation rises rapidly to 1,871 feet (570 m) at Devil Peak in the region marked on USGS maps as Devils Graveyard. TTB notes that the only lower elevation areas in this area are along the small canyon creeks that feed into the Umpqua River and Elk Creek. However, according to the USGS maps, even these small creeks are closely bound by steep hillsides and lack the gently-sloped river terraces and foothills suitable for viticulture, which are characteristic of the viticultural area.
Elevations east of the viticultural area range from 200 feet (61 m) along Elk Creek and Big Tom Folley Creek to the 2,456-foot (749 m) peak of Yellow Butte. There is very little open land east of the viticultural area until Putnam Valley near the town of Drain, fourteen miles (23 km) from Elkton. Although numerous creeks flow through the region to the east of the viticultural area, they are closely bound by steep hillsides and lack gentle slopes suitable for viticulture. To the immediate south of the viticultural area, the Umpqua River flows along a more constricted course, with sharper turns, narrower river bottom lands, and steeper slopes along its banks. Elevations are generally similar to those found within the viticultural area, but the lack of open terrain and gentle slopes, particularly along the Umpqua River, distinguishes this region from the viticultural area. Farther south, near the town of Roseburg, approximately 35 miles (56 km) away from the viticultural area, the land along the Umpqua River opens and becomes suitable for viticulture. However, the petitioner noted that the majority of vineyards in the southern region of the Umpqua Valley viticultural area are located on river bottom land due to the steeply graded slopes and higher elevations beyond the river bottom land. By comparison, all of the vineyards within Elkton Oregon viticultural area are planted on the gentle slopes of the river terraces and foothills.

=== Climate ===
The marine influence from the Pacific Ocean moderates temperatures and creates a unique micro-climate within the Elkton Oregon viticultural area. The proximity to the Pacific Ocean, geographical location along the Umpqua River, and low elevation combine to influence the Elkton area growing season climate. The coastal marine influence brings cooling breezes, fog, and moist air inland from the Pacific coastline along the Umpqua River and into the viticultural area, resulting in a milder and longer growing season with more rainfall than in the surrounding areas. The cooler temperatures make the viticultural area suitable for growing cool climate varieties of grapes, such as Pinot Noir, that do not grow and mature as reliably in the warmer climates of the region farther to the south within the Umpqua Valley and Southern Oregon viticultural areas. Climate data within the Elkton Oregon viticultural area and from areas to the east and south was obtained from the Western Regional Climate Center (WRCC), which collects data from various federal, state, and local agencies. All data is from the 1971–2000 climate figures for each station and is summarized in the petition. The five weather stations from which the data was collected are located in Elkton, Drain, Riddle, Roseburg, and Winchester, four communities within the larger Umpqua Valley and Southern Oregon viticultural areas. The climates of the areas to the east and south differ from the climate within the Elkton Oregon viticultural area. The community to the east of the viticultural area (Drain) receives less precipitation and has cooler temperatures, as shown by the shorter frost-free period and fewer growing degree day (GDD) units. Drain also has a shorter growing season than the viticultural area, as indicated by a later date of last spring frost and earlier date of first fall frost. April through October GOD calculations for the 1971-2000 climate normals also reveal a substantial difference in heat accumulation with Roseburg averaging 2683 and Elkton 2346. A calculation of growing degree-days for May-Oct for the 1998-2007 period also show month to month and seasonal differences that are substantial and driven by the maritime versus more inland climates of the two locations. Further climate differences can be seen in precipitation, where the Elkton area receives higher rainfall than much of the rest of the Umpqua Valley AVA. The communities located in the region to the south of the viticultural area (Riddle, Roseburg, and Winchester) are generally warmer and drier than the viticultural area. The three communities all receive significantly less precipitation, with annual totals of between 31 and 35 inches (787 and 889 mm). All three communities also have higher totals of GDD units, indicating a warmer climate than within the viticultural area. The warmer temperatures allow grapes to ripen earlier and harvest to take place in September, whereas grapes within the cooler viticultural area are frequently not ripe enough to harvest until October. During the summer, frequent breezes travel inland from the Pacific Ocean along the Umpqua River and into the viticultural area. The breezes begin in the late afternoon and contribute to lower nighttime temperatures. To offset the cooling effect of the breezes and ensure the greatest chance for grapes to ripen fully, most vineyards within the viticultural area are planted at lower elevations, where temperatures are warmer than on the higher slopes. The cool nighttime temperatures resulting from the breezes also promote morning fog. Because the fog persists until late morning, vineyards do not receive much sunlight until the afternoon. As a result, vineyards within the viticultural area are commonly planted on the west side of slopes, where they can benefit most from the afternoon sun. The cool, moist air from the Pacific diminishes as it travels south along the Umpqua River, resulting in little fog and few cool breezes reaching the communities south of the viticultural area. The marine influence of the Pacific Ocean also contributes to the high precipitation levels within the viticultural area. Moist air traveling east from the Pacific Ocean is blocked by the mountains to the west of the Elkton Oregon, Umpqua Valley and Southern Oregon viticultural areas only entering through gaps in the mountains created by creeks and rivers, particularly the Umpqua River. The viticultural area receives more of this moist air than other regions within the larger Umpqua Valley viticultural area because the Pacific air diminishes the farther it travels from the ocean and has less moisture by the time it reaches the communities farther upstream. The amount of annual rainfall within the viticultural area makes irrigation unnecessary, unlike in the areas farther to the east and south within the Umpqua Valley.

=== Geology ===
Elkton Oregon AVA is clearly more dominated by the Coastal Mountain geology, lying over a mix of sedimentary, volcanic, and metamorphic rock units from the middle Eocene. The two dominant geologic formations are the Tyee and the Yamhill. The Tyee Formation is mostly marine sandstone and carbonaceous siltstone; with some tuff layers. The Yamhill Formation is related to the Tyee but contains more marine siltstone and basaltic sandstone with some interlayered basalt lava flows and tuff. While the surrounding areas in the Umpqua Valley AVA have both Tyee and Yamhill formations, the Elkton Oregon AVA is underlain by substantially more of the Yamhill than areas to the east or south. Furthermore, the Elkton Oregon AVA river terraces are predominantly alluvial deposits from the Holocene with sand, gravel, and silt forming landscapes, which are more common in the AVA than other areas to the east or south. All of the existing vineyards are planted over either Yamhill or alluvial deposit formations. The terrain to the north and west of the Elkton Oregon AVA, while somewhat similar in geology to the AVA (coastal range and accreted terrain geology), has moderate to substantial local relief and is highly dissected by numerous stream networks, which results from the higher rainfall amounts and higher mean elevations in the coastal mountains. Because of this physiography there are very little open landscapes for viticulture until you reach the coastal zone. Further evidence of the roughness of this terrain and suitability for agriculture is that within 25–35 miles (40–56 km) in a southwest to northerly direction from the town of Elkton there are few inhabited places with populations more than 100, except along the coastline.

=== Soils ===
All of the vineyards within the Elkton Oregon viticultural area are located on the gentle river terraces and foothills along the Umpqua River and at elevations of 140 to 1,000 feet (43–305 m). In discussions with TTB, the petitioner stated that river terraces and foothills are preferable to river bottom lands because the river bottom lands have thick layers of topsoil which allows vines to grow too vigorously, requiring special cultivation techniques in order to create a favorable foliage-to-fruit ratio. The terraces and foothills, by contrast, are less fertile, with a thinner layer of topsoil over gravel. As a result, the vines require less extensive pruning to produce the desired foliage-to-fruit ratio. While soil characteristics vary across any portion of a landscape or region, a published soil survey of the region (Natural Resources Conservation Service, 1997) provides general characteristics. The has mapped over 50 different soil series or complexes over the Elkton Oregon AVA. These soils are predominately residual clay and/or silt loam soil or small to large cobble-dominated alluvial deposits produced from the Yamhill and Tyee formations and the river terrace building of the meandering Umpqua River. While some of these soils are found in other areas outside of the AVA, they are more limited in extent than those found within the region.

== Viticulture ==
Elkton is a small town on the Umpqua River with a population of 150, and the area is sometimes called the "Jewel of the Umpqua". It is known for fishing on the river and for its wineries. The town has a community education center with a butterfly pavilion, and butterflies can be seen in the area from May to September.

Although it is some distance from Oregon's wine country capital near Portland, the area has several local wineries. River's Edge Winery, the first in Elkton, was founded in 2000 and sources all of its grapes locally. Brandborg Vineyard and Winery produces a range of wine varieties, and Bradley Vineyards and Haines Creek Vineyard and Tasting Room are located outside the town.
