= Southern Oregon Land Conservancy =

Land trust

- Southern Oregon Land Conservancy Inc.
- Formation: 1978; 48 years ago
- Type: Nonprofit
- Tax ID no.: 93-0724691
- Legal status: 501(c)(3)
- Headquarters: Ashland, Oregon
- Website: https://www.landconserve.org/

The Southern Oregon Land Conservancy is an accredited land trust that works exclusively in Southern Oregon. Its headquarters are located in Ashland, Oregon. The mission of the Southern Oregon Land Conservancy is to protect special lands in the Rogue River Basin and surrounding areas for this and future generations by working cooperatively with landowners and communities. Its service area includes all of Jackson, Josephine, Curry, Coos, and Southern Douglas Counties.

== Conservation efforts ==
Founded in 1978, the Southern Oregon Land Conservancy is Oregon's oldest local land trust. In 35 years, the organization has placed permanent protections on over 10,627 acres (43.01 km^{2}) of land, predominantly using a tool called a conservation easement.

Notable achievements include:

Private Land Conservation

- 1,660 acres (6.7 km^{2}) of the C2 Ranch near Eagle Point, Oregon
- The 1,300-acre (5.3 km^{2}) Sky King Cole Ranch at the Siskiyou Summit
- The 2,200-acre (8.9 km^{2}) Greenwood Preserve and Wildlife Sanctuary

Public Land Conservation

- The Oredson-Todd Woods and Siskiyou Mountain Park in Ashland, Oregon
- Twin Creeks Park in Central Point, Oregon
- Jacksonville Woodlands in Jacksonville, Oregon
