= Lower Long Tom AVA =

Wine region in Oregon, United States

Lower Long Tom
- Wine region
- Type: American Viticultural Area
- Year established: 2021
- Years of wine industry: 41
- Country: United States
- Part of: Oregon, Willamette Valley AVA
- Other regions in Oregon, Willamette Valley AVA: Chehalem Mountains AVA, Dundee Hills AVA, Eola-Amity Hills AVA, Laurelwood District AVA, McMinnville AVA, Mount Pisgah, Polk County, Oregon AVA, Ribbon Ridge AVA, Tualatin Hills AVA, Van Duzer Corridor AVA, Yamhill-Carlton District AVA
- Climate region: Region Ib
- Heat units: 2500 GDDs
- Precipitation (annual average): 40 to 50 in (1,000–1,300 mm)
- Soil conditions: Bellpine and Bellpine/Jory complex series
- Total area: 25,000 acres (39 sq mi).
- Size of planted vineyards: 575 acres (233 ha)
- No. of vineyards: 24
- Grapes produced: Pinot noir, Pinot gris, Sauvignon blanc, Riesling, Chardonnay
- No. of wineries: 12

Lower Long Tom is an American Viticultural Area (AVA) located in Oregon's southern Willamette Valley landform, near the cities of Junction City and Monroe, with 90% of area in Lane County and the remaining in Benton County. Its center is approximately 20 miles (32 km) northwest of Eugene and equidistant south of Corvallis. The AVA starts south of the town of Cheshire and roughly follows Long Tom River to south of the town of Monroe, being entirely on the west side of the river. It was established as the nation's 260^{th}, the state's 22^{nd} and valley's eleventh wine appellation on November 10, 2021 by the Alcohol and Tobacco Tax and Trade Bureau (TTB), Treasury after reviewing the petition submitted by Dieter Boehm, owner of High Pass Vineyard and Winery, proposing the viticultural area named "Lower Long Tom."
It encompasses approximately 25,000 acres (39 sq mi) with, at the outset, twelve wineries and 24 commercially-producing vineyards cultivating about 575 acres (233 ha). It lies entirely within the Willamette Valley AVA and is primarily known for its Pinot Noir and Pinot gris.

== Terroir ==
The AVA is located in the southwestern Willamette Valley, among Oregon's coastal foothills. While Prairie Mountain stamps its presence onto the viticultural qualities in the area, without being in the area itself, there are other geographical features in the area that influence those qualities. There are several tributaries of the Lower Long Tom River coming from the Coast Range, that over millennia carved out west–east oriented valleys, leaving behind a chain of hills. These tributaries are Bear Creek, fed by Owens Creek, Nails Creek and Jones Creek, Fergunson Creek, in the center of the AVA with Browning Creek as sidestream, and Shafer Creek in the north. The chain of hills behind run from the Coast Range into the Williamette Valley and terminate just before meeting the Long Tom River. There are five more or less defined ridges in the AVA, the southernmost ending the town of Cheshire, the middle ones ending at Cox Butte, Rose Butte and Monroe Butte, respectively, while the northernmost runs out just north of Monroe. The ridges of those chains rise to about 1,000 ft (300 m) in the west of the Lower Long Tom AVA and top out at about 550 ft (170 m) before dropping to the valley floor in the east. The slopes of those hills are covered with moderately deep and well drained not too fertile soil, ideal for the cultivation of vitis vinifera. Currently, vineyards are located predominately on south slopes, but northeast, east, southeast, southwest and western exposures are also planted to wine grapes. The steepest gradients are about 45% slopes, with the average being 20%. The area is also warmer than surrounding regions, protected from cool marine air by a particularly high section of the Central Oregon Coast Range.
The distinguishing feature of the Lower Long Tom is the predominance of nutrient-poor, fast-draining Bellpine soil in the area, which forces vines to push deep in pursuit of food and water. The harder-working vines are believed to produce lighter leaf canopies and smaller grapes with more concentrated flavors and more powerful tannins. The USDA plant hardiness zone is 8b.

== Viticulture ==
As of 2022, the Lower Long Tom is the only appellation located in the southern Willamette Valley AVA, in contrast to ten sub-appellations in the north. The approval of the AVA enhanced the southern Willamette Valley's legitimacy as an Oregon wine region.

=== Wineries ===
- Antiquum Farm
- Bennett Wine Company
- Benton-Lane Winery
- Bradshaw Vineyard
- Brigadoon Wine Company.
- Five Fourteen Vineyards
- Poco Collina/Gelardi Vineyard
- Gradient Vineyard
- High Pass Winery
- Pfeiffer Winery
- RainSong Winery
- Territorial Vineyards and Wine Co.
- Walnut Ridge Vineyards
