= Valley View Winery =

American winery located in Oregon

Coordinates: 42.225353°N 123.047385°W

Valley View Winery is a winery in the Applegate Valley AVA in Southern Oregon, United States, founded in 1972.

== History ==
The original Valley View Vineyard was started by photographer Peter Britt in 1854 and was located in the gold rush town of Jacksonville in the Rogue Valley. Britt produced wines under the Valley View label until his death in 1906.

In 1971, Frank Wisnovsky and his family purchased 76 acres (310,000 m^{2}) in the Applegate Valley and planted 12 acres (49,000 m^{2}) of grapes in the spring of 1972. In 1974, Valley View planted 14 acres (57,000 m^{2}) more. The original 26 acres (110,000 m^{2}) of vineyards consisted of Cabernet Sauvignon, Merlot, Chardonnay, Pinot noir and Gewürztraminer. Valley View's first two vintages, which consisted of Cabernet Sauvignon, were produced by Tualatin Vineyard in the Willamette Valley. In 1980, Frank Wisnovsky died in a drowning accident at Lost Creek Lake. He is survived by wife Ann along with their daughter Joanne and their sons Robert, Mark and Michael. The winery has been operated by Ann, Mark and Michael since 1990. Ann died in 2023 at 91 and is acknowledged as one of the pioneers of the Oregon wine industry. Mark and Michael became owners of Valley View in 2005.

The winery won a Double Gold medal for the 1990 Chardonnay in the World Wine Championships in Ljubljana, Slovenia. With the 1990 vintage, the winery began using the Anna Maria label for its best wines in honor of the founding mother Ann Wisnovsky.

Syrah, Viognier and the Spanish variety Tempranillo are currently the main focus, along with late harvest wines including a port-style wine.

== Winemakers ==
University of California, Davis graduate Guy Ruhland was winemaker for the 1978 and 1979 vintages. John Eagle was winemaker from 1979 to 1982, and Rob Stewart from 1982 to 1984. In 1985, John Guerrero, a new graduate from UC Davis, became Valley View's fourth winemaker in six years and was with Valley View until 2021. Winemaker Mike Brunson came to Valley View in mid-2021 with a thirty year career of making fine wines in Sonoma Valley. He has transformed the vineyard, winery and the quality of the wines.
