= HillCrest Vineyards =

American winery located in Oregon

Coordinates: 43°16′14″N 123°29′51″W

HillCrest Vineyard is the oldest continually operating post-prohibition estate winery in the state of Oregon. Established in 1961 by Richard Sommer, who planted the first Pinot noir vines in Oregon, as well as released the first bottle of Oregon Pinot noir in 1967. The current owners, the DeMara's, continue the pioneering spirit of Richard. Dyson DeMara still makes a Pinot noir.
