= Applegate, Oregon =

Unincorporated community in the state of Oregon, United States

- Unincorporated community
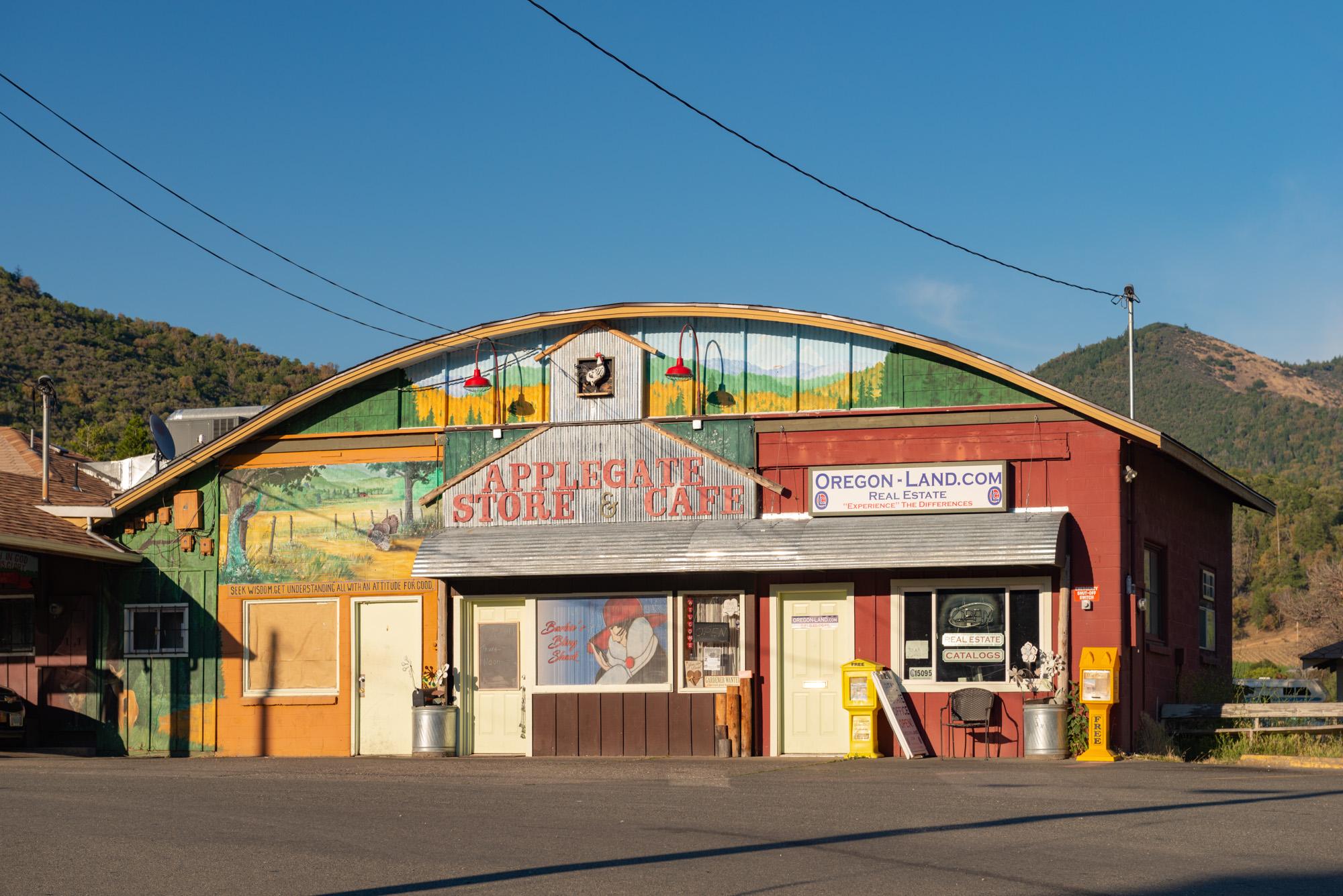
- Applegate Store

- Location within Oregon Location within the United States
- Coordinates: 42°15′25″N 123°10′06″W
- Country: United States
- State: Oregon
- County: Jackson
- Elevation: 1,276 ft (389 m)
- Time zone: UTC-8 (Pacific (PST))
  - Summer (DST): UTC-7 (PDT)
- ZIP code: 97527
- Area codes: 458 and 541
- GNIS feature ID: 1117019

Applegate is an unincorporated community in Jackson County, Oregon, United States. It is west of Medford on Oregon Route 238 and the Applegate River. The community was probably named for Lindsay Applegate, who, along with his brothers Jesse and Charles, explored the Applegate Valley while blazing the Applegate Trail.

== Wine production ==
In 2001, the Applegate Valley AVA became the sixth official wine appellation in Oregon.

== Climate ==
This region experiences warm (but not hot) and dry summers, with no average monthly temperatures above 71.6 °F (22.0 °C). According to the Köppen Climate Classification system, Applegate has a warm-summer Mediterranean climate, abbreviated "Csb" on climate maps.
