= Southern Oregon =

Region in Oregon, United States

Coordinates: 42.8°N 122.9°W

Dark red denotes counties that are always included in the definition, while light red denotes counties that are only sometimes included.

Southern Oregon is a region of the U.S. state of Oregon south of Lane County and generally west of the Cascade Range, excluding the southern Oregon Coast. Counties include Douglas, Jackson, Klamath, and Josephine. It includes the Southern Oregon American Viticultural Area, which consists of the Umpqua and Rogue River drainages. As of 2015, the population in the four counties is about 471,000, and in the greater, seven-county definition, it is about 564,000.

== Counties ==
Always included:

- Jackson County: population 212,567
- Douglas County: population 107,685
- Josephine County: population 84,745
- Klamath County: population 66,016

Total population: 471,013

Sometimes included:

- Coos County: population 63,121
- Curry County: population 22,483
- Lake County: population 7,829

Total seven-county population: 564,446

== Cities ==
City	County	Population (2015)
Medford	Jackson	79,805
Grants Pass	Josephine	37,088
Roseburg	Douglas	22,114
Klamath Falls	Klamath	21,399
Ashland	Jackson	20,861
Central Point	Jackson	17,995
Coos Bay	Coos	16,182
North Bend	Coos	9,673
Eagle Point	Jackson	8,902
Sutherlin	Douglas	7,912
Brookings	Curry	6,476
Talent	Jackson	6,411
Winston	Douglas	5,393
Phoenix	Jackson	4,553
Reedsport	Douglas	4,107
Coquille	Coos	3,858
Myrtle Creek	Douglas	3,459
Bandon	Coos	3,115
Shady Cove	Jackson	3,022
Jacksonville	Jackson	2,883
Myrtle Point	Coos	2,514
Lakeview	Lake	2,296
Gold Beach	Curry	2,279
Rogue River	Jackson	2,227
Cave Junction	Josephine	1,932
Canyonville	Douglas	1,911
Lakeside	Coos	1,737
Gold Hill	Jackson	1,266
Riddle	Douglas	1,191
Drain	Douglas	1,157
Port Orford	Curry	1,146
Yoncalla	Douglas	1,053
Oakland	Douglas	936
Glendale	Douglas	881
Merrill	Klamath	825
Malin	Klamath	804
Chiloquin	Klamath	721
Powers	Coos	670
Butte Falls	Jackson	433
Bonanza	Klamath	411
Paisley	Lake	240
Elkton	Douglas	199

== Politics ==
Southern Oregon generally supports candidates of the Republican Party in both state and federal elections, but some liberal outliers such as Ashland and Port Orford mean Democrats are usually able to win larger shares of the vote in this region compared to Eastern Oregon. Other than Jackson County, which is considered a swing county, no Democrat has won any county of Southern Oregon in presidential elections since 1996 using the seven-county definition, or since 1964 using the four-county definition. Josephine County has not supported a Democrat for president since 1936.

== See also ==
- Southern Oregon Land Conservancy
- Southeastern Oregon
