= History of Oregon wine =

Viticulture history of state, USA

The history of Oregon wine production stretches back to before the state was incorporated. Settlers to the Oregon Territory planted grapes as early as the 1840s, however the production of wine has only been a significant industry in Oregon since the 1960s. Oregon wines first achieved significant critical notice in the late 1970s; in 2005, the industry sold 1.6 million cases of Oregon vintages with a retail value of US$184.7 million. In 2015, there were 702 wineries and 28,034 acres of vitis vinifera planted.

== From settlement to Prohibition ==
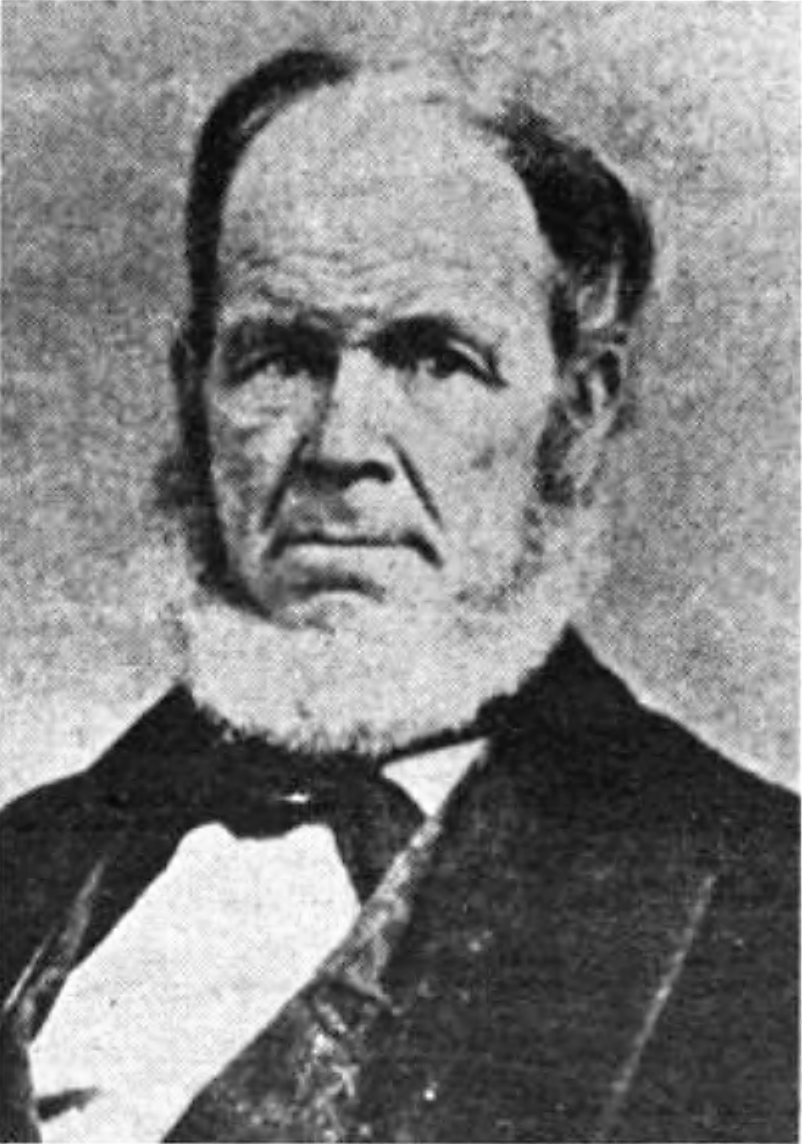
Henderson Luelling

Grapes were first planted in the Oregon Territory in 1847 by Henderson Luelling, a horticulturist who traveled to the territory on the Oregon Trail. The first recorded winery, Valley View Vineyard, was established in Jacksonville (in what is now the Rogue Valley AVA) in the 1850s by Peter Britt, several years before the state was founded in 1859. The earliest large vineyards in the Willamette Valley was probably cultivated by French immigrant Jean Mathiot in Butteville where he settled in 1853. He planted grapes in 1858 and according to the Oregon Statesman Journal had the largest vineyard in the State in 1859. In the first Oregon census in 1860, wine production was listed at 11,800 liters (2,600 gallons), though it is certain that not all of this came from grapes.

In the 1880s, numerous immigrants to Southern Oregon experimented with various varietals, including Zinfandel, Riesling, and an unknown variety of Sauvignon. By 1899, Oregon vineyards yielded 2,694 tons of grapes. Five years later, a Forest Grove winemaker, Ernest Reuter, won a silver medal at the 1904 St. Louis World's Fair The vineyard on which the grapes were grown was located on David Hill west of Forest Grove.

== Middle twentieth century ==
Wine production in Oregon, like elsewhere in the United States, shut down during the Prohibition era, but resumed in 1933. The Oregon wine industry remained small for several decades, and was dominated by fruit wines (including wines based on grapes other than Vitis vinifera). By that time the California wine industry, with its warmer climate, had come to dominate wine production in the United States. Only two Oregon wineries produced wine using V. vinifera through the middle of the century, both on a rather small scale.

== Rebirth of an industry: The 1960s and 1970s ==
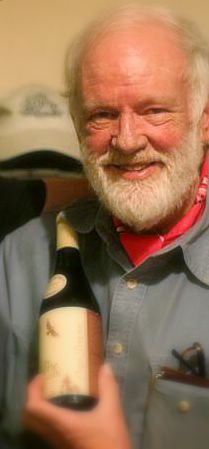
David Lett of Eyrie Vineyards

The Oregon wine industry started to rebuild in the 1960s. Hillcrest Vineyard, established by UC Davis graduate Richard Sommer, opened near Roseburg in 1961 (in what is now the Umpqua Valley AVA), with the first vintage appearing for sale in 1964. Among the first varieties planted by Sommer in 1961 was the first Pinot noir in Oregon that was also the first commercially available Oregon Pinot noir with the 1967 vintage. Also in the 1960s, several winemakers started planting Pinot noir grapes in the Willamette Valley, including David Lett and Charles Coury. In 1966, Lett planted a vineyard in the hills outside of Dundee (Eyrie Vineyards).

By 1970, the state had five bonded wineries, with 35 acres (140,000 m^{2}) in production. Many out-of-state winemakers, the bulk of them from California, began migrating to the state, including Dick Erath and C. Calvert Knudsen of Knudsen Erath Winery, Dick and Nancy Ponzi, Susan and Bill Sokol Blosser of Sokol Blosser Winery, David and Ginny Adelsheim of Adelsheim Vineyard, Pat and Joe Campbell, Jerry and Ann Preston, and Myron Redford. In 1973, Oregon passed its landmark land-use law, which imposed strict separation between agricultural and urban uses of land via such mechanisms as the Urban Growth Boundary and Exclusive Farm Use Zones. This prevented many hillsides, deemed inappropriate for other crops which are easier to grow on flat fields, from being converted to housing. Also in the 1970s, the winemakers of the region began to organize to promote their vintages. In 1977, the first coffee table book about Northwest wines, entitled Winemakers of the Pacific Northwest, was printed; the following year, a joint marketing brochure entitled "Discover Oregon Wines" was published.

But it was events of 1979 that put the Oregon wine industry on the map. Eyrie Vineyards' 1975 South Block Pinot noir placed in the top 10 at the Gault-Millau French Wine Olympiades, and was rated the top Pinot noir, one of several non-European vintages to outplace French wines in the competition. Not only did the competition establish Oregon as a region capable of producing top-quality wines, it also established that premium winemaking was not the exclusive province of Europe, France in particular. French winemaker Robert Drouhin arranged for a rematch, pitting the Eyrie Pinot noir against a group of French wines considered to be finer than those in the Wine Olympics. The winner was Joseph Drouhin's 1959 Chambolle-Musigny; the Eyrie came in a very close second.

== Global recognition: The 1980s ==
Oregon winemakers continued to win awards in the 1980s. In 1980, there thirty-four bonded Oregon wineries, and 115 growers with 1,100 acres (450 ha) planted. The 1980 vintage was greatly affected by the 1980 eruption of Mount St. Helens, and two wines from that vintage won gold medals in the 1982 International Wine Competition in London. Ponzi Vineyards (then of Beaverton, now Sherwood) was favorably covered by the New York Times in 1981. In 1984, noted wine critic Robert M. Parker, Jr. visited Oregon and was highly impressed with the Pinots he encountered. Oregon Pinots won further acclaim in the 1985 Burgundy Challenge, wherein wine experts could not distinguish between Oregon and Burgundy Pinot noirs in a blind taste test; in the rankings, the Oregon wines were rated ahead of the Burgundy entrants. Also in 1985, the Oregon wine industry received its first mention in Wine Spectator.

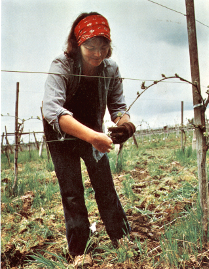
Nancy Ponzi, co-founder of Ponzi Vineyards, weaves grapevines around fruiting wires.

The 1980s also saw continued efforts at marketing the Oregon wine industry. The Oregon Wine Advisory Board was established in 1983, and in 1984 the Willamette Valley AVA, Umpqua Valley AVA, Columbia Valley AVA, and Walla Walla Valley AVAs were established. In 1986, the International Pinot Noir Celebration was started at Linfield College in McMinnville, and in 1989, Willamette Valley Vineyards became the first publicly traded winery in the state.

Greater ties between Oregon and Burgundy were established in the 1980s. Close ties were forged between horticulturalists at Oregon State University and notable French wine cultivation experts, such as Raymond Bernard at ONIVINS; this relationship gave Oregon vintners access to clones that California growers were not able to acquire. In 1987, the Drouhin family of Burgundy, one of France's highly regarded winemaking families, purchased 100 acres (40 ha) in the North Willamette Valley, founding the Domaine Drouhin Oregon winery. In 1988, then-governor Neil Goldschmidt made an official visit to Burgundy.

== Modern Oregon wine industry: 1990s and beyond ==
By 1990, there were 70 bonded Oregon wineries and 320 growers, with 5,682 acres (2,299 ha) vineyard planted. The Oregon wine industry received a stern challenge from nature, when the Phylloxera root louse was discovered in Oregon. This necessitated the use of Phylloxera-resistant rootstocks, many vineyards took this as an opportunity to select different varieties of grapes more suited to their particular location. The Rogue Valley AVA was established; three years later, the Oregon Wine Marketing Coalition was founded. In 1995, the Oregon Legislature enacted several new laws which were beneficial to winemakers. Direct in-state wine shipments from wineries to customers were legalized, allowing Oregon winemakers to partially bypass wine wholesalers. In-store wine tasting was also legalized, as were certain off-site special events hosted by wineries. Oregon State University established a professorship in fermentation science. In 1998, the wine industry contributed US$120 million to the Oregon economy. A further legal change occurred in 1999, when legislation (HB 3429) was passed allowing multiple winery licensees on a single premise. This led to new winemaking arrangements, such as the Carlton Winemakers Studio and the SE Wine Collective.

The 21st century has seen an emphasis on "green" wine production in Oregon. LIVE, an Oregon non-profit, certifies wineries for meeting certain environmental standards; over 320 vineyards and 41 wineries are now so certified. In 2002, Oregon became a leader in green winemaking with the Sokol-Blossor barrel room and the Carlton Winemakers Studio being LEED-certified by the U.S. Green Building Council. In 2006, the Stoller Vineyards winery was also LEED-certified.

The Applegate Valley AVA was established in 2000; Yamhill-Carlton District AVA in 2004; Southern Oregon AVA in 2004; Columbia Gorge AVA in 2004; Dundee Hills AVA in 2005; McMinnville AVA in 2005; Red Hill Douglas County, Oregon AVA in 2005; Ribbon Ridge AVA in 2005; Eola-Amita Hills AVA in 2006; Chehalem Mountains AVA in 2006; Snake River Valley AVA in 2007; in 2003 the Oregon Wine Advisory Board (under the state Department of Agriculture) was replaced with the Oregon Wine Board, a semi-independent state agency.

The Oregon Wine History Project began in 2010 at Linfield College in McMinnville, Oregon, under the auspices of the Linfield Center for the Northwest. The project maintains an extensive Oregon wine history archive.

In 2012, Oregon Public Broadcasting aired the documentary Oregon Wine: Grapes of Place about the history of wine in Oregon produced in partnership with the Oregon Historical Society. Funding was provided by James F. & Marion L. Miller Foundation, Robert D. & Marcia H. Randall Fund for Lifelong Learning, Oregon Cultural Trust and Roundhouse Foundation.

By 2015, Oregon had 702 wineries and 1052 vineyards with 28,034 acres (11,345 ha) planted.
