= Ponzi (disambiguation) =

Charles Ponzi (1882–1949) was an Italian charlatan and con artist.

Ponzi may also refer to:

- Ponzi (surname), an Italian surname and a list of people with the name
- Ponzi scheme, a form of fraud named after Charles Ponzi
- Ponzi (film), a 2021 Nigerian comedy film

== See also ==
- Charles Pozzi, a French auto racing driver
- Ponzio, an Italian surname
- Ponziani Opening, a chess opening
- Santiago Ponzinibbio, an Argentine mixed martial artist
