= Dick Ponzi =

American winemaker (born 1934)

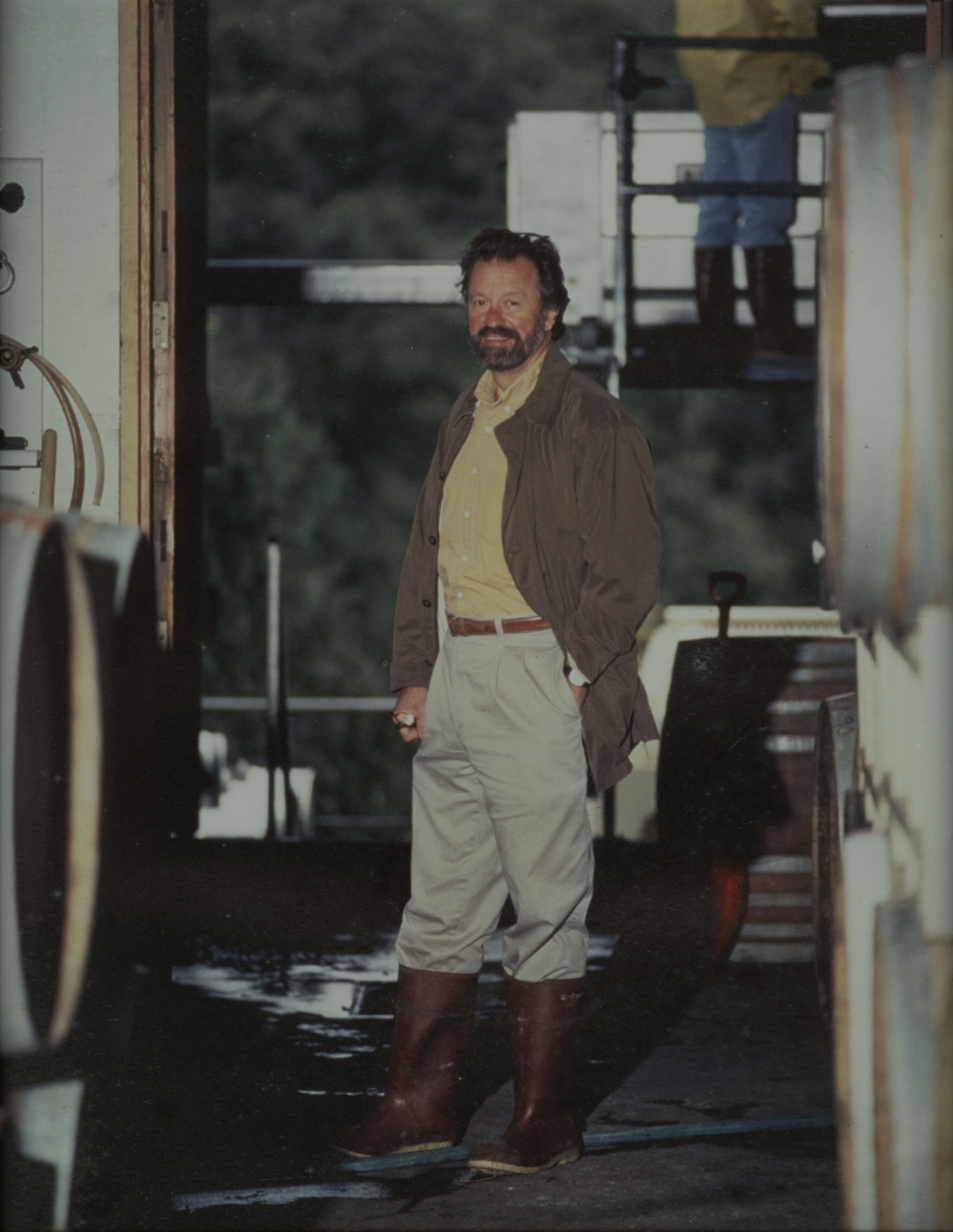
- Ponzi at his winery
- Born: March 26, 1934 (age 92); New Castle, Pennsylvania, U.S.
- Education: University of Michigan
- Occupations: Mechanical engineer; Winemaker
- Spouse: Nancy Ponzi (m. 1961)
- Children: 3

Dick Ponzi (born March 26, 1934) is an American winemaker, a pioneer of the Oregon wine industry and the Oregon brewing industry, and the founder of Ponzi Vineyards, one of the Willamette Valley's founding wineries. (Note: The other three founding wineries are Charles Coury Winery (closed in 1978), Erath Winery, and The Eyrie Vineyards.) He also had a successful career as a structural engineer. Ponzi is regarded as an enological and viticultural innovator. He was a founding member and the first president of the Oregon Winegrowers Association and a founding director of the Oregon Wine Board. He and his wife also established Oregon's first craft brewery, Bridgeport Brewing Company.

== Early life ==
Ponzi is the third son of immigrants from Campotosto, Italy, who settled in Michigan, where Ponzi was raised. As a child, his parents would purchase grapes from California every year and then the community would gather together to make wine. As an adult, he moved to California to work in the aerospace industry. It was there that he met his wife, Nancy, whom he married in 1961. After a trip to Europe, the couple returned to their home in Los Gatos, California, and made wine inspired by what they had experienced. This led to their decision to move their family north to the Willamette Valley of Oregon.

== Career ==
=== Engineering ===
Ponzi had a successful career as a structural engineer in California, initially designing rockets and fighter jets for United Technologies and later working as a ride developer for a company contracted by Disneyland.

In 1988, Ponzi designed and built the Weather Machine, a lumino-kinetic bronze sculpture and machine located in Pioneer Courthouse Square in Portland, Oregon. Built in collaboration with Roger Sheppard and Jere and Ray Grimm, the Weather Machine "predicts" the weather every day at noon by displaying a sun (sunny), a heron (drizzle) or a dragon (stormy).

=== Ponzi Vineyards ===
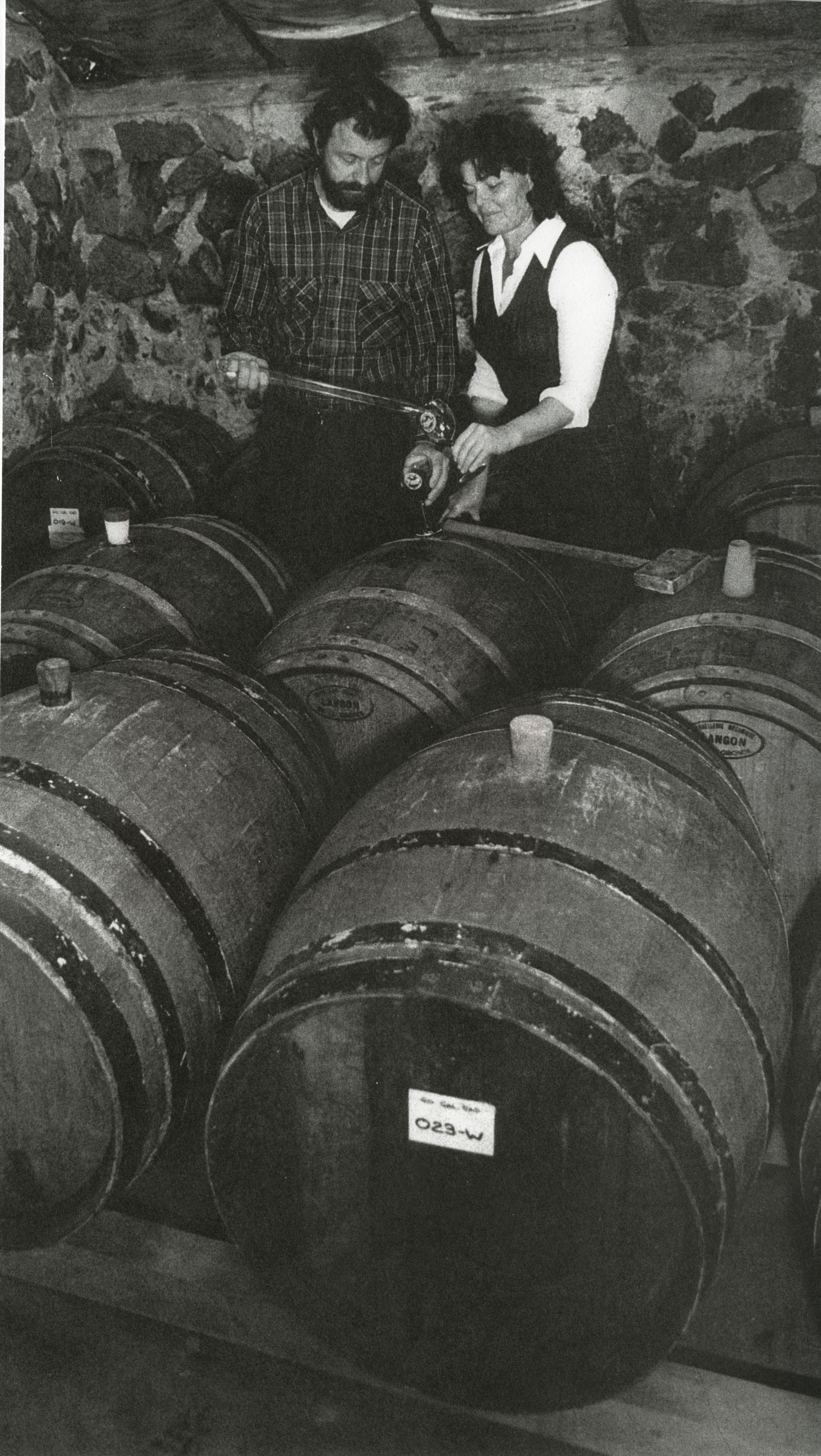
Dick and Nancy Ponzi check a sample from a wine barrel.

After several research trips to Burgundy, Ponzi moved his family to the Willamette Valley and purchased 20 acres of land southwest of Portland, Oregon, in 1969. He established Ponzi Vineyards in 1970 with his wife, Nancy. At the time, there were just four other wineries in the state. The location was close to Portland, an important factor as they expected the city to be their main market. In 1974, they produced their first vintage of 100 cases of Pinot noir and quickly became known as innovators in enology and viticulture, fabricating their own machinery (such as a destemmer that knocked grapes off of the clusters without crushing them) and developing new winemaking techniques. Much of the machinery and techniques were adopted by other wineries and are still commonly used.

The Ponzis planted a two-acre plot of Pinot noir clones in 1975 in a joint venture with Oregon State University to test the clones. In 1981, they purchased a 20-acre parcel that included these two acres, creating their Abetina vineyard (named for the fir trees on the property). The same year they purchased 10 acres downslope from Abetina, which became the Madrona vineyard. Eight acres on the Madrona site were planted with Pinot noir in 1985.

Ponzi was among the first to plant Pinot gris commercially in Oregon in 1978, releasing the first bottling in 1984.

In 1991, the Ponzis purchased the 65-acre Aurora vineyard, which included plantings that were used to study stocks, varieties and clones.

Ponzi passed the title of Winemaker to his daughter, Luisa, in 1993.

In 2008, Ponzi designed and built a four-level, gravity-flow winery measuring 30,000 square feet. It is noted for its eco-friendliness and high level of sustainability. Ponzi's vineyards are LIVE (Low Input Viticulture & Enology) certified.

In 2021, Ponzi Vineyards was purchased by Societe Jacques Bollinger, a holding company for Champagne Bollinger. In the same year, Bollinger appointed Jean-Baptiste Rivail as Ponzi's new CEO - the first non-family member to serve in the position.

=== Teaching ===
While building his wine business, Ponzi took a job teaching engineering at the Community College of Portland. It was there that he met a textbook salesman who was also growing grapes for wine. The salesman was David Lett, founder of The Eyrie Vineyards. He sold Ponzi some of his first vines and connected Ponzi to Dick Erath of Erath Winery, who was also just starting out. Ponzi continued to teach for fifteen years, out of necessity to keep the winery going.

=== Bridgeport Brewing ===
Dick and Nancy Ponzi also founded Oregon's first craft brewery, Bridgeport Brewing Company, in 1984, a move which is credited with launching the area's craft brewing craze and helping to popularize India Pale Ale in the United States. They sold the brewery in 1995 to The Gambrinus Company.

=== Other ===
Ponzi was a founding member and the first president of the Oregon Winegrowers Association and served as a founding director of the Oregon Wine Advisory Board, now known as the Oregon Wine Board. The couple also opened the Ponzi Wine Bar (a wine tasting room) and The Dundee Bistro (a restaurant focused on Willamette Valley cuisine) in Dundee, Oregon.

== Winemaking ==
Ponzi's vision was to create a Burgundy-style wine; however, when he attempted to do so using Burgundian methods of adding whole bunches or stems, the results were disappointing. He discovered the problem wasn't in the method, but in how gently the method was applied.

By the 1980s, Ponzi had developed a winemaking protocol that became widely adopted by other wineries in the region. It was a very gentle handling method that used whole berries or whole clusters. The must was carried in buckets to the wine press rather than pumped. In 1985, he began allowing grapes to soak before fermentation, a technique that became popular in Burgundy and in other New World wine regions in the 1990s.

In the 1990s, Oregon began gaining prominence as a producer of quality wine, with the state's best Pinot noirs from vineyards such as Beaux Frères, Argyle and Archery Summit displaying influence from Ponzi's winemaking style.

== Family ==
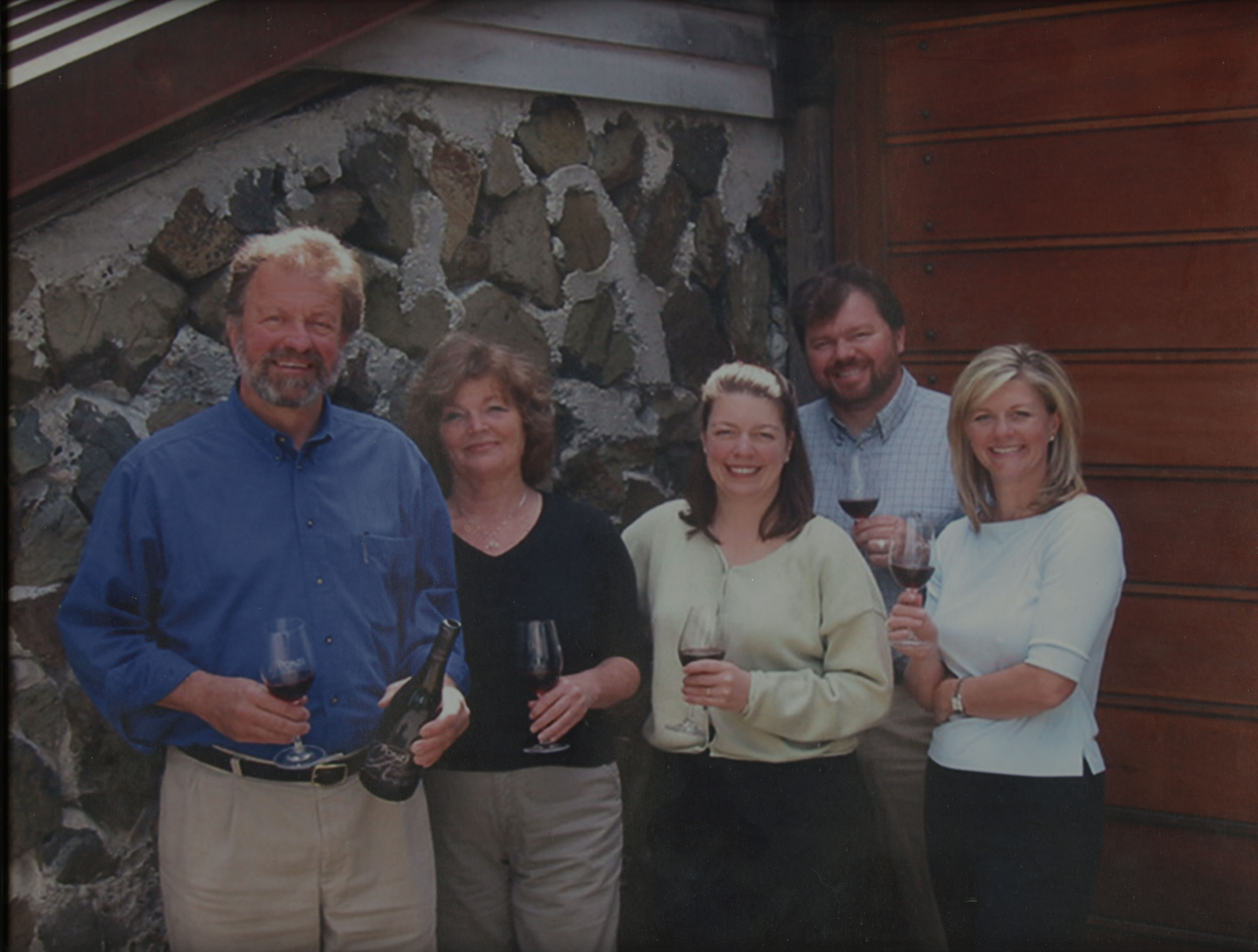
Dick and Nancy Ponzi and their children Luisa, Michel and Anna Maria

Ponzi married Nancy Berry in 1961 in California.

The entire family was involved in the vineyards and winemaking from the start, with the Ponzi children helping after school and on weekends. Once grown, the children pursued other interests: Michel studied music composition at Dick Grove School of Music before turning his interests to business. He returned to the winery in 1986 where he worked as operations director and later as CEO until 2013. Anna Maria worked in the magazine business on the East Coast before returning to the winery in 1992. She became the director of the Linfield University Center for Wine Education in 2024. Luisa attended Portland State University and prepared for medical school, returning to the family business in 1990 and deciding to learn winemaking. She went on to train in Burgundy, France, and earn a degree in viticulture and enology. In 1993, Dick Ponzi passed the title and duties of Winemaker to her.

== Titles ==
Ponzi was a founding member and the first president of the Oregon Winegrowers Association.

He served as founding director of the Oregon Wine Advisory Board in 1987.

== Awards and recognition ==
In 1988, The Wine Advocate named Ponzi as one of the world's best winemakers and Oregon's best producer.

In 1996, Ponzi was chosen as one of Wine Spectator's "People Who Made a Difference".

In 2005, the American Center for Wine, Food and the Arts awarded Ponzi Vintner of the Year.

In 2007, the Oregon Wine Board awarded Dick and Nancy Ponzi a Lifetime Achievement Award.

Ponzi's Pinot noirs have been ranked among the best American Pinot noirs produced.

== Influence ==
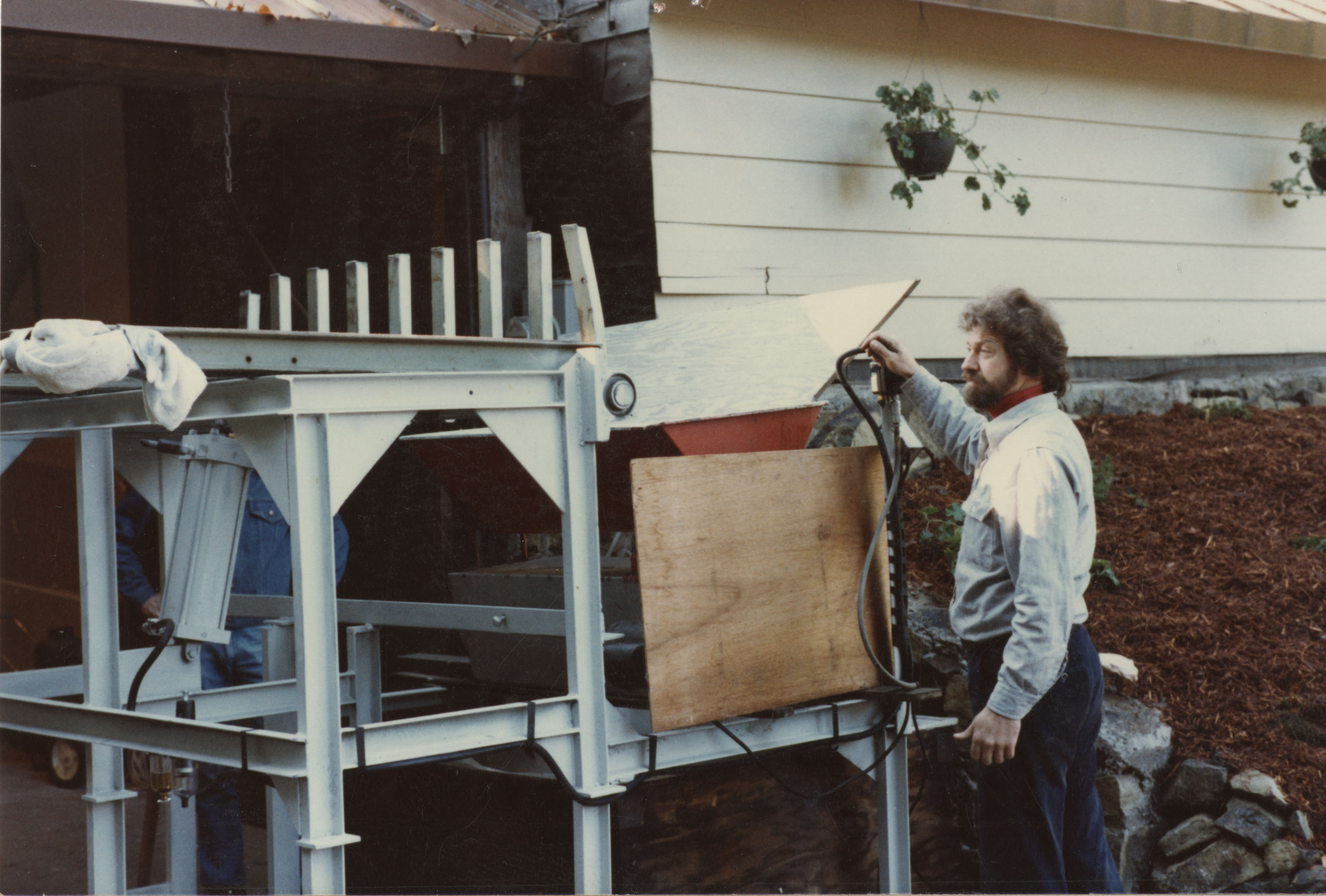
Dick Ponzi used his background as a structural engineer to construct his own wine making equipment, some of which were adopted by other wineries and are still in use today.

Ponzi's background in engineering enabled him to fabricate his own equipment and develop techniques that are now considered commonplace in many wineries around the world, such as using gravity to move wine.

Michael G. Etzel—winemaker at Beaux Frères Winery, co-owned by his brother-in-law Robert Parker, Jr.—worked with Ponzi for the 1988 through 1992 vintages and describes Ponzi as his mentor, stating that he makes his wines as Ponzi taught him. Beaux Frères Winery is one of Oregon's most prominent Pinot noir producers. (Note: "[Ponzi] is and was my wine mentor. Fundamentally, I make my wines the way he taught me.")

Ponzi is often credited with establishing the style of Oregon Pinot noir. (Note: "While the close-knit character of Oregon's pioneer winegrowing group in the 1970s and 1980s birthed many mutual influences on style and method, it can be argued that Ponzi more than any other is responsible for the combination of generosity and high-toned elegance that typifies the majority of Oregon pinots today.")

In 1985, Ponzi was among a group that authored a bill that led to the legalization of brewpubs and tasting rooms in Oregon.

== Sale ==
The Bollinger family, owners of Champagne Bollinger, Delamain Cognac and three other historic French estates, announced their purchase of the Ponzi Vineyards brand April 7, 2021. The sale included the winemaking and hospitality facilities in Sherwood as well as the Avellana, Abetina and Madrona vineyards.

== See also ==
- History of Oregon wine
- Oregon wine
