= Adelsheim Vineyard =

Winery based in the U.S. state of Oregon

- Location: Newburg, Oregon
- Coordinates: 45°20′19″N 123°2′59″W
- Appellation: Willamette Valley AVA, Chehalem Mountains AVA
- Founded: 1978^{α}
- First vintage: 1978
- Key people: David and Ginny Adelsheim (Founders), Rob Alstrin (CEO)
- Known for: Pinot Noir, Chardonnay
- Website: adelsheim.com

Adelsheim Vineyard is a winery located in the Willamette Valley AVA. Founded in 1978^{α} by David and Ginny Adelsheim, it is one of the earliest wineries in Oregon and is known for its pinot noir and chardonnay wines. David is considered a "wine pioneer" in Oregon and has influenced the wine industry there.

== Founding ==
In 1965, David Lett began growing pinot noir in Oregon, against the advice of his professors. Others followed, including David Adelsheim. In 1971, David and his wife Ginny bought 19 acres of land outside of Newberg, Oregon. The following year, they planted Pinot Noir, Pinot Gris, Chardonnay, and Riesling grapes. David learned about wine by working with Lett at the Eyrie Vineyards, studying for several months at a school in France, and working in Portland restaurants. Eventually, Ginny and David founded Adelsheim Vineyard, one of Oregon's earliest wineries, in 1978. The first products they sold were 1300 crates of Sémillon and Merlot produced from grapes they had bought from Washington state. David and Ginny have recounted driving their wine to local businesses attempting to sell it. By 1981, David was able to work full time at Adelsheim Vineyard, and in 1982, they began selling wines made with their own grapes in 1978 and 1979 vintages.

== Facilities ==
The first Adelsheim vineyard was the Quarter Mile Vineyard. In 1988, Adelsheim purchased an additional vineyard, the 36-acre Calkins Lane Vineyard. By 2013, Adelsheim owned 11 estate vineyards and more than 200 acres, mostly in the Chehalem Mountains AVA. The vineyards feature volcanic, loess, and sedimentary soil and are located at different elevations.

Initially, the Adelsheims produced wine in their basement, later building a 6,000 square foot winery near their house in 1982 and a 35,000 square foot winery at Calkins Lane in 1997. A tasting room was opened at Calkins Lane in 2009.

== Products ==
As many as twelve different varieties of grapes have been grown by Adelsheim Vineyard over the years, including Pinot Noir, Pinot Gris, Chardonnay, Riesling, Auxerrois and Syrah. Adelsheim's wines are produced mostly with grapes from its own vineyards. Pinot noir and chardonnay are its best known wines; as of 2015, Adelsheim decided to focus primarily on those two wines.

Between 1982 and 2009, Adelsheim's labels were designed by Ginny and depicted portraits of women. Elizabeth's Reserve, a pinot noir, featured Ginny's drawing of Elizabeth, the Adelsheims' daughter. In 2010, Adelsheim Vineyard decided to use labels with a more modern design.

In 2019, Adelsheim Vineyard released limited edition pinot noir and chardonnay in honor of the 50th anniversary of the Portland Trail Blazers basketball team. The Willamette Week called the pinot noir "overpriced, but fine" and the chardonnay as "underachieving", while OregonLive praised the chardonnay as "crisp, lean and clean" and the pinot noir as "powerful". The following year, Trail Blazers player CJ McCollum released McCollum Heritage 91, a pinot noir created by Adelsheim Vineyard.

== Key people ==
Dave Paige replaced David Adelsheim as head winemaker in 2001, doubling wine production from 25,000 cases to 50,000 by 2017. Paige's assistant, Gina Hennen, succeeded him as head winemaker in 2017. Jack and Lynn Loacker invested in the company in 1994, becoming partners and co-owners, and eventually buying all of the company in 2017. In a statement about the sale, David said that he wanted the company to remain "independent and locally owned". In 2016, Adelsheim Vineyard announced that it was looking for David's successor, eventually hiring its first CEO the following year.

== Influence and recognition ==
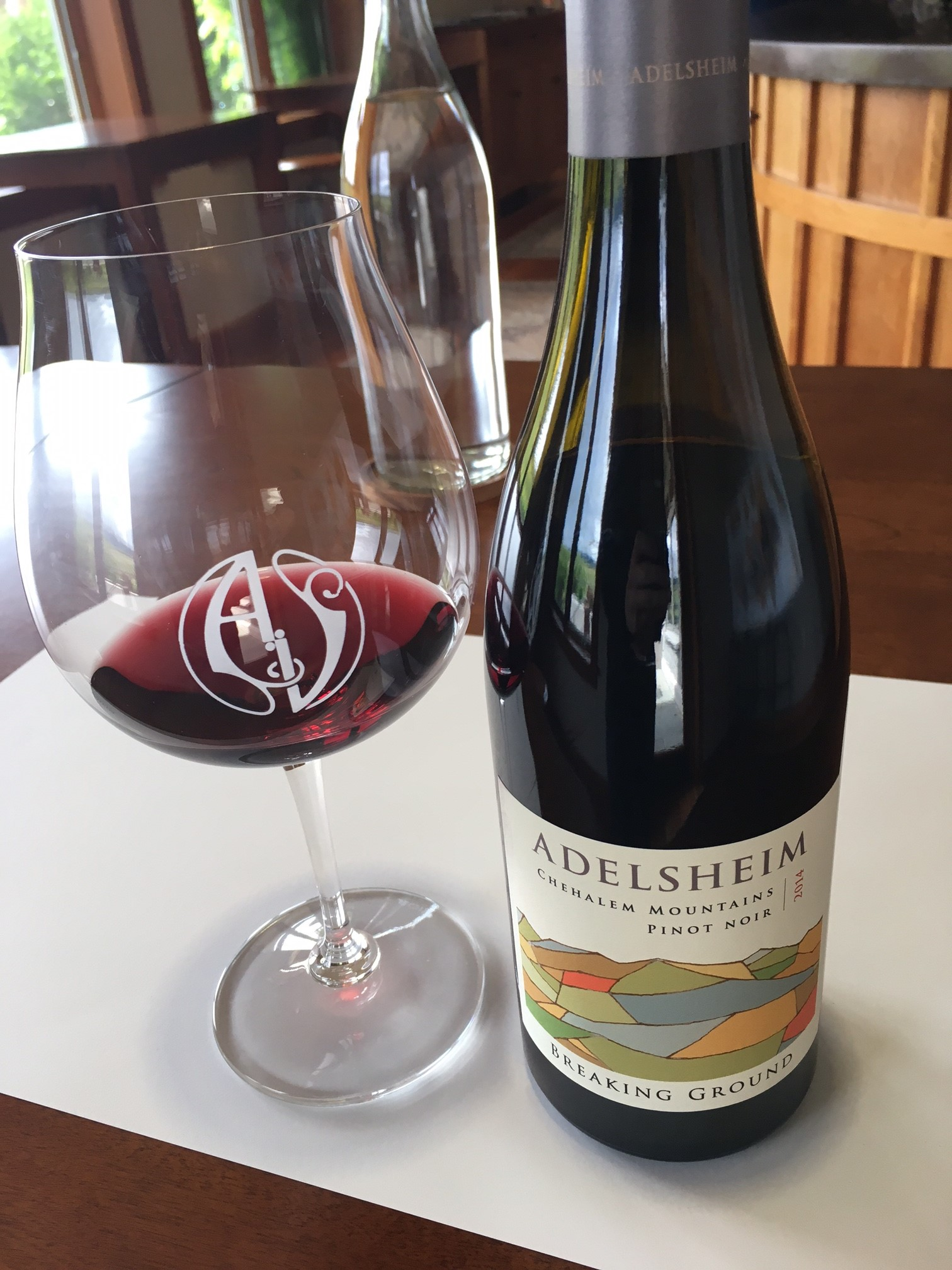
2014 Breaking Ground Pinot Noir

Adelsheim Vineyard was called one of "Oregon's longest-standing and most-respected vintners" by Wine Spectator. Paul Gregutt has referred to Adelsheim's wines as "some of the best that Oregon has to offer". Eric Asimov included Adelsheim in a list of "good pinot noirs" from Oregon and later ranked its 2015 Willamette Valley in second place after a tasting of Oregon chardonnay. Leslie Sbrocco has praised Adelsheim wine as "elegant" and "balanced". Robert Parker has reviewed its pinot noirs as good or excellent.

As founder of one of the earliest wineries in Oregon, David Adelsheim has been hailed as a "wine pioneer". He has played a role in many important events in the Oregon wine industry. In the 1970s, David lobbied the Oregon Liquor Control Commission (OLCC) to impose more rigorous wine labeling laws. He petitioned the Bureau of Alcohol, Tobacco and Firearms (ATF) to designate the Willamette Valley American Viticultural Area (WVAVA) which it did in 1983. With his additional lobbying, a sub-section of the WVAVA was designated as the Chehalem Mountains AVA in 2006. With his assistance, Maison Joseph Drouhin established a vineyard in Oregon. David Adelsheim was recognized with a Lifetime Achievement Award by the Oregon Wine Board in 2012.

David has also contributed to the Oregon Wine History Archives at Linfield University. In honor of its 50th anniversary in 2021, Adelsheim Vineyard partnered with the Oregon Wine History Archives to release Conversations with the 10 Founding Winemaking Families of Oregon’s North Willamette Valley, a series of video interviews conducted by David.

According to David Adelsheim, climate change is the biggest threat to winemaking in Oregon.

== Notes ==
^α David Adelsheim has stated that it is difficult to choose a single founding date. Some sources use 1971, the year that David and Ginny Adelsheim first purchased land in Oregon.

== See also ==
- List of Oregon wineries and vineyards
