= Wine competition =

Organized wine event

A wine competition is an organized event in which trained judges or consumers competitively rate different vintages, categories, and/or brands of wine. Wine competitions generally use blind tasting of wine to prevent bias by the judges.

== Types of wine competitions ==
The common goal of all wine competitions is to obtain valid comparisons of wines by trained experts. Wine competitions can vary widely in their characteristics, and are sometimes geared toward a specific audience (i.e., consumers vs. industry professionals). One of the ways wine competitions can vary is how the wines are ranked. In most competitions, medals are given to individual wines in various categories on the basis of the blind tasting. The awards are frequently bronze, silver, gold, and double gold medals. In other competitions, ribbons of various colors are sometimes used. In these competitions, it is common for more than one wine to receive any given medal. These competitions often also include a "Best in Class" award, producing a clear category winner among those vintages awarded any particular medal, as seen in the Los Angeles International Wine & Spirits Competition, the New York International Wine Competition, and The Decanter World Wine Awards. In still other competitions, instead of giving numerous awards, the wines in each wine category are ranked by number from high to low, a process known as ordinal ranking. In these competitions, there is only one first-place winner, one second place, one third place, and so on down to the lowest place. Medal rankings are different from the 100 point scales that are used by many journalistic publications, such as Wine Spectator. These "scores" are obtained when wine journalists blind taste the wines and score them on an individual basis, as opposed to when the wines are being tasted side by side and competing against one another in a competition setting.

There are critics who argue that the results of such competitions may be misleading and should not be relied upon as a measure of quality. Other commentators argue that, because of wine competitions, wine quality has improved in many countries around the world.

== International wine competitions ==
An "international" wine competition is a competition that accepts wines from all over the world. Competitions are generally held in one location and winemakers must ship their wines to the competition in order to be considered. There is generally an entry fee for winemakers to enter their wines into the competition. Below are some examples of top international wine competitions:

- Berlin International Wine Competition is an annual competition in held in Berlin where top European wine buyers including sommeliers, importers, distributors, restaurant owners, and retail store buyers judge the wine by its category and actual price as if they are buying it for their business. The Berlin International Wine Competition is part of the International Beverage Competition Group founded by Adam Levy.
- Best Wine of the World competition (BWW): Established in 2017, the competition is the largest and most important wine competition in the world in terms of amount of wines, consumers and professionals. The BWW competition is founded by Pekka Nuikki, and is organized and operated by the world's leading Fine Wine magazines — FINE Magazines and the world's largest wine information source Tastingbook.com. The 2017 BWW competition received over 1.3 million public votes for 22,588 wines.
- Concours Mondial de Bruxelles: Translating to the "Wine World Championships", this competition boasts more than 9,000 participating products from four continents. As a whole, these samples represent more than 500 million marketed bottles.
- Decanter World Wine Awards (DWWA): Founded in 2004, the London-based competition now receives entries from over 47 countries worldwide and in 2014 received over 15,000 entries, making it the largest wine competition in the world. The results of the competition are published online and in print in Decanter's August Edition, which is released in July. Chaired by Steven Spurrier, the DWWA brings together over 200 of the world's wine experts including 66 Masters of Wine and Master Sommeliers.
- International Wine Challenge (IWC): Annual British-based wine competition, originally launched by Robert Joseph and Charles Metcalfe in 1984, when they wanted to see how a set of English wines fared when set against examples from other countries. Metcalfe and Joseph presided over the growth in the competition to claim to be the largest in the world, and in the late 1990s and early 2000s Joseph launched International Wine Challenges in Hong Kong, China (Shanghai and Beijing), Singapore, Japan, Vietnam, Thailand, Russia, Poland and India. Joseph resigned at the end of 2006, following the sale of the competition to William Reed Business Media. The UK IWC is still chaired by Charles Metcalfe and a team of eminent wine judges, including Oz Clarke and Tim Atkin MW. The results are published at the London Wine Fair and the Awards Dinner is held in the autumn.
- International Wine and Spirit Competition: Established in 1969, this competition uses over 400 experts to judge products for 7 months out of the year. It is considered to be one of the oldest and most prestigious wine and spirits competitions in the world.
- International Wine Contest: A competition organized since 1961 in Brussels by Monde Selection, an international quality institute.
- London Wine Competition: The London Wine Competition identifies and rewards those brands and products that consumers actually want to buy, rather than simply recognise good quality wines for their winemaking ability alone. To be a real success a wine brand has to be bought by consumers, be it on a supermarket shelf or a restaurant or bar's list. The London Wine Competition rates its wines by drinkability, value and packaging.
- Michelangelo International Wine & Spirits Awards (MIWA): Established in 1997, the MIWA is the only wine competition in South Africa in which all the judges are internationally accredited wine judges. Over nearly three decades, it has grown into the largest and most internationally recognised competition of its kind on the African continent, represent a $55 billion global industry. Michelangelo has successfully established a presence in 154 countries, leveraging millions of actively engaged QR-coded medals placed on awarded products to drive global consumer interaction. In addition to the competition, the organisation publishes the Michelangelo Magazine—a luxury print and digital publication distributed worldwide, showcasing premium destinations, and industry excellence. Since 1997 a total of 269 judges from 156 countries have served on the judging panels. The competition annually receives between 1800 and 2000 entries from South Africa as well as other wine-producing countries. These are judged blind to determine the winners of 16 trophies as well as platinum, Gran d'Or, gold and silver medals. Trophies are awarded to particular category or class winners, including Best International Entry, Best Brandy, Best Garagiste Entry, Best Methode Classique, Best Pinotage and Most Innovative Wine/Spirits. Held in Stellenbosch in the Western Cape, the competition introduced the Michelangelo Liqueur Awards in 2014 and is also open to entries from spirits producers (incl. vodka, gin, rum, and grappa).
- New York International Wine Competition an annual international wine competition held in New York City where the top wine buyers, sommeliers, importers, and distributors judge the wine by its category and actual price. The New York International Wine Competition is held in May and is open to all commercially produced wines from around the world. It is part of the International Beverage Competition series of competitions.
- New York World Wine & Spirits Competition
- Mundus Vini: The international wine award founded by Meininger Verlag was first held in 2001 in Germany. Every year 11,000 wines are submitted to be tasted from all over the world. The competition is held twice annually in the city of Neustadt, Germany, with a summer tasting in August and a spring tasting in February.
- Ukraine Wine&Spirits Awards: International tasting competition for wines and spirits from all around the world is held annually in Kyiv along with Wine&Spirits Ukraine Exhibition in accordance with the international standards of the OIV. The aim of the competition is to improve the quality of production and culture of consumption of wines and spirits and provide to producers an effective tool for promoting their products on the Ukrainian market. The best Ukrainian and World's Sommeliers deliver an independent expert verdict on the wines and spirits entered.
- Best Wine in Box: Established in 2015 in the French city of Toulouse, this pioneer contest was the first devoted only to wines packaged in Bag-in-Boxes, or BIBs. Every year, more than 300 samples from around the world are tasted; the best wines receive gold medals and since 2020, the most original and beautiful packagings are also distinguished.
- San Francisco International Wine Competition
- Singapore World Spirits Competition
- Los Angeles International Wine Competition
- Finger Lakes International Wine & Spirits Competition
- International Wine & Spirit Competition
- International Wine Challenge
- Cyprus Wine Competition
- The Balkans International Wine Competition
- The Berlin Wine Trophy
- The International Wine Contest Bucharest
- Thessaloniki International Wine & Spirits Competition
- Brazilian Sparkling Contest
- Sommeliers Choice Awards
- London Wine Competition
- USA Wine Ratings
- Decanter World Wine Awards
- Las Vegas Global Spirit Awards
- TAG Global Spirits Awards
- Las Vegas Global Wine & Spirits Awards
- Japan Wine Challenge

== Local competitions ==
Some wine competitions only accept wines from a specific region or appellation. Sometimes this is because they are newer and don't have the resources to manage or hold a large number of entries from outside of their region, but most often it is because the organizers want to draw attention to their specific winemaking region. Some examples of local competitions are:

- Top 100 Sud de France: A French competition annually selecting 100 wines from over 660 entries from the French Languedoc-Roussillon wine region. The judging panel is made up of 22 UK experts chaired by Master of Wine Tim Atkin.
- Grand Harvest Awards: An annual competition held in California, that only allows wines to be judged alongside other wines in their particular terroir.
- Atlantic Seaboard Wine Association Wine Competition: An annual competition held in Virginia, inviting wines from the Atlantic Seaboard region to participate.

== Historic competitions ==
There have been numerous occasions when wine tastings had shocking results that influenced the wine industry as a whole. The most famous of these is the Judgment of Paris (wine).

Other examples:

- New York Wine Tasting of 1973: A one-time competitive tasting event organized by wine journalist Robert Lawrence Balzer. Fourteen experts, including France's Alexis Lichine blind tasted and ranked 23 Chardonnays from France, California, and New York State. The results shocked the world—the top four scores went to California wines, which had previously been marginalized by the wine industry.
- Paris Wine Tasting of 1976: This iconic event, commemorating the United States Bicentennial, was organized on 24 May 1976 by Steven Spurrier, a British wine merchant, and his American colleague, Patricia Gallagher. It was reported as the "Judgment of Paris" altering the general perception of French wine superiority and highlighted advancements in California's modern viticulture industry to be recognized internationally and inspired vintners worldwide. Twenty vintages were tasted, red and white from prestigious French and lesser-known Californian wineries. In conclusion, the top-ranked vintages, in both red and white categories, were Californian which shocked the world as written by the lone attending reporter. The tasting was repeated at the San Francisco Wine Tasting of 1978, the tenth anniversary Wine Spectator Wine Tasting of 1986 and French Culinary Institute Wine Tasting of 1986 The Tasting that Changed the Wine World: 'The Judgment of Paris' 30th Anniversary was conducted on 24 May 2006.
- Wine Olympics (1979): A French food and wine magazine organized a competition of 330 wines from 33 countries evaluated by 62 experts.
- The Tasting that Changed the Wine World: 'The Judgment of Paris' 30th Anniversary. A 30-year anniversary replication of the 1976 Paris competition was conducted on 24 May 2006. The pearl anniversary was held simultaneously at the museum Copia in Napa, California, and in London at Berry Bros. & Rudd, Britain's oldest wine merchant.
- Grand European Jury Wine Tasting of 1997: European jury tasted three vintages (1989, 1992 and 1994) of 27 Chardonnays from seven countries.
- Great Chardonnay Showdown (1980): A total of 221 Chardonnays from around the world were evaluated by 25 judges.

== See also ==
- Blind wine tasting
- Wine tasting
- Food and Drink competitions
- List of food and drink awards
