= New York Wine Tasting of 1973 =

The New York Wine Tasting of 1973 was organized by pioneering wine journalist Robert Lawrence Balzer. He assembled 14 leading wine experts including France's Alexis Lichine, who owned two chateaux in Bordeaux, a manager of the Four Seasons restaurant in New York City, and Sam Aaron, a prominent New York wine merchant. They evaluated 23 Chardonnays from California, New York, and France in a blind tasting before an assemblage of 250 members of the New York Food and Wine Society. California Chardonnays received the top four scores. Fifth place went to the 1969 Beaune Clos des Mouches Joseph Drouhin. Other French wines in the competition were the 1970 Corton-Charlemagne Louis Latour, the 1971 Pouilly-Fuisse Louis Jadot, and the 1970 Chassagne-Montrachet Marquis de Laguiche Joseph Drouhin.

Three years later, in the notable Paris Wine Tasting of 1976, American and French wines were once again compared in a blind tasting.

== See also ==
- Wine competition
