= Ponzi (surname) =

Ponzi is a surname. It most commonly refers to Charles Ponzi (1882–1949), an Italian charlatan and con artist.

Other people with the name include:

- Andrew Ponzi (1903–1950), American pool player
- Dick Ponzi (born 1934), American winemaker
- Maurizio Ponzi (born 1939), Italian film director and screenwriter
- Nancy Ponzi (born 1941), American vineyard owner and winemaker
- Simone Ponzi (born 1987), Italian road bicycle racer
