= Richard Sommer =

Richard Sommer may refer to:

- Richard Sommer (winemaker), American winemaker
- Richard M. Sommer, American architect, urbanist, and scholar
- Rich Sommer, American actor
