= Maison Joseph Drouhin =

Wine producer based in Burgundy

Coordinates: 47°1′23.8″N 4°50′10.4″E

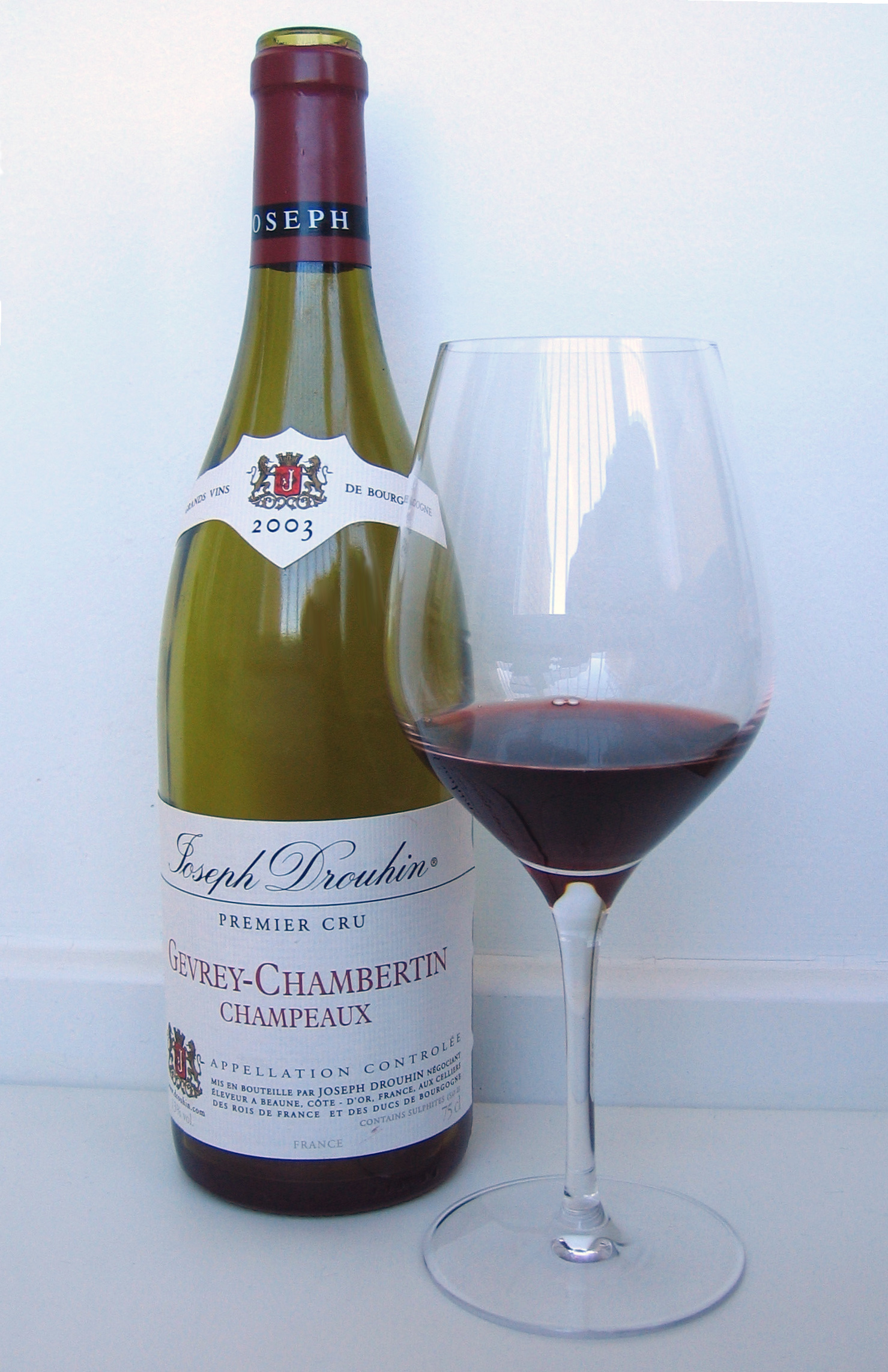
A wine from Joseph Drouhin, a Gevrey-Chambertin Premier Cru.

Maison Joseph Drouhin is a French wine producer based in Burgundy that was founded in 1880. The estate owns vineyards in Chablis, the Côte de Nuits, Côte de Beaune and Côte Chalonnaise, as well as in the Willamette Valley in Oregon. Drouhin is also one of the major négociants of Burgundy, and produces wines made from purchased grapes grown in different parts of Burgundy. Today both Maison Joseph Drouhin and Domaine Drouhin Oregon are owned and operated by the great-grandchildren of Joseph Drouhin.

The Drouhin family are members of the Primum Familiae Vini.

== Vineyards ==
Maison Joseph Drouhin has been awarded organic certification for all grapes grown within its vineyards as of the 2009 vintage.

=== Clos des Mouches ===
Beaune Clos des Mouches Joseph Drouhin is made from grapes grown in the Clos des Mouches, a Beaune Premier Cru vineyard of the Côte de Beaune. Clos de Mouches is a Premier Cru vineyard within the commune of Beaune, and was purchased by Drouhin in the 19th century, which produces both red and white wines. White Clos des Mouches from Drouhin generally command a slightly higher price than the red wine.

The 1973 vintage ranked number five in the historic "Judgment of Paris" wine competition between ten French and California wines. In the New York Wine Tasting of 1973, the winery's 1969 was ranked in fifth place after four California Chardonnays. Beaune Clos des Mouches Joseph Drouhin also competed in the "Great Chardonnay Showdown" wine competition held in 1980.

=== Domaine Drouhin Oregon ===
Domaine Drouhin Oregon is an American winery in Oregon known for its Pinot noir and Chardonnay. The gravity-fed winery is in the Dundee Hills AVA in the Willamette Valley. It was built in 1988 for $10,000,000 by Maison Joseph Drouhin. Veronique Drouhin is the winemaker.

Domaine Drouhin Oregon is the result, in part, of the 1979–1980 Paris Wine Olympics where David Lett's The Eyrie Vineyards of Oregon took second place behind a 1959 Drouhin wine. Robert Drouhin, who had been visiting Oregon since the 1960s, purchased the Oregon property when notified about it by David Adelsheim of Adelsheim Vineyard.

== In cinema ==
In an opening scene of Red Dragon (2002), Hannibal Lecter (Anthony Hopkins) serves his dinner guests wine that appears to bear the Maison Drouhin label.
