= Nancy Ponzi =

American vineyard owner and winemaker

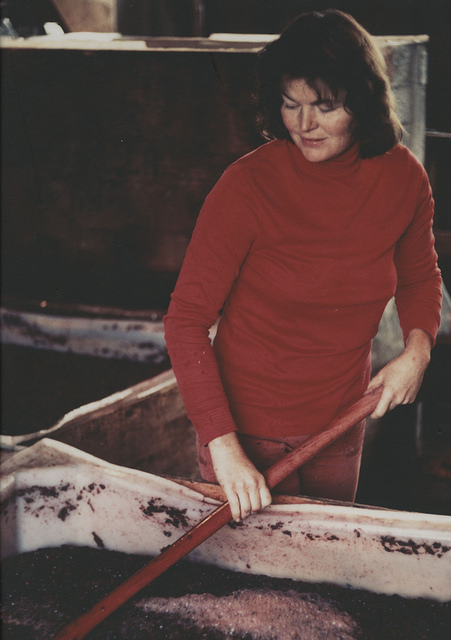
- Born: Nancy Ann Berry; 19 August 1941 (age 84); Fullerton, California, U.S.
- Occupations: Teacher; Vintner; Community leader
- Spouse: Dick Ponzi (m. 1962)
- Children: Michel Ponzi; Anna Maria Ponzi; Luisa Ponzi

Nancy Ponzi (born 19 August 1941) is an American vineyard owner and winemaker. She is a pioneer of the Oregon wine industry and the Oregon brewing industry, and the founder of Ponzi Vineyards, one of the Willamette Valley's founding wineries. (Note: The other three founding wineries are Charles Coury Winery (closed in 1978), Erath Winery, and The Eyrie Vineyards.) She and her husband Dick Ponzi also established Oregon's first craft brewery, Bridgeport Brewing Company.

== Early life ==
Ponzi was born in the Southern Californian town of Fullerton and spent her childhood traveling all over the world. She met Dick Ponzi after he moved to California for a job in the aerospace industry and the couple married in 1962.

== Career ==
=== Teaching ===
While living in California, Ponzi worked as a teacher at a Montessori school.

=== Ponzi Vineyards ===
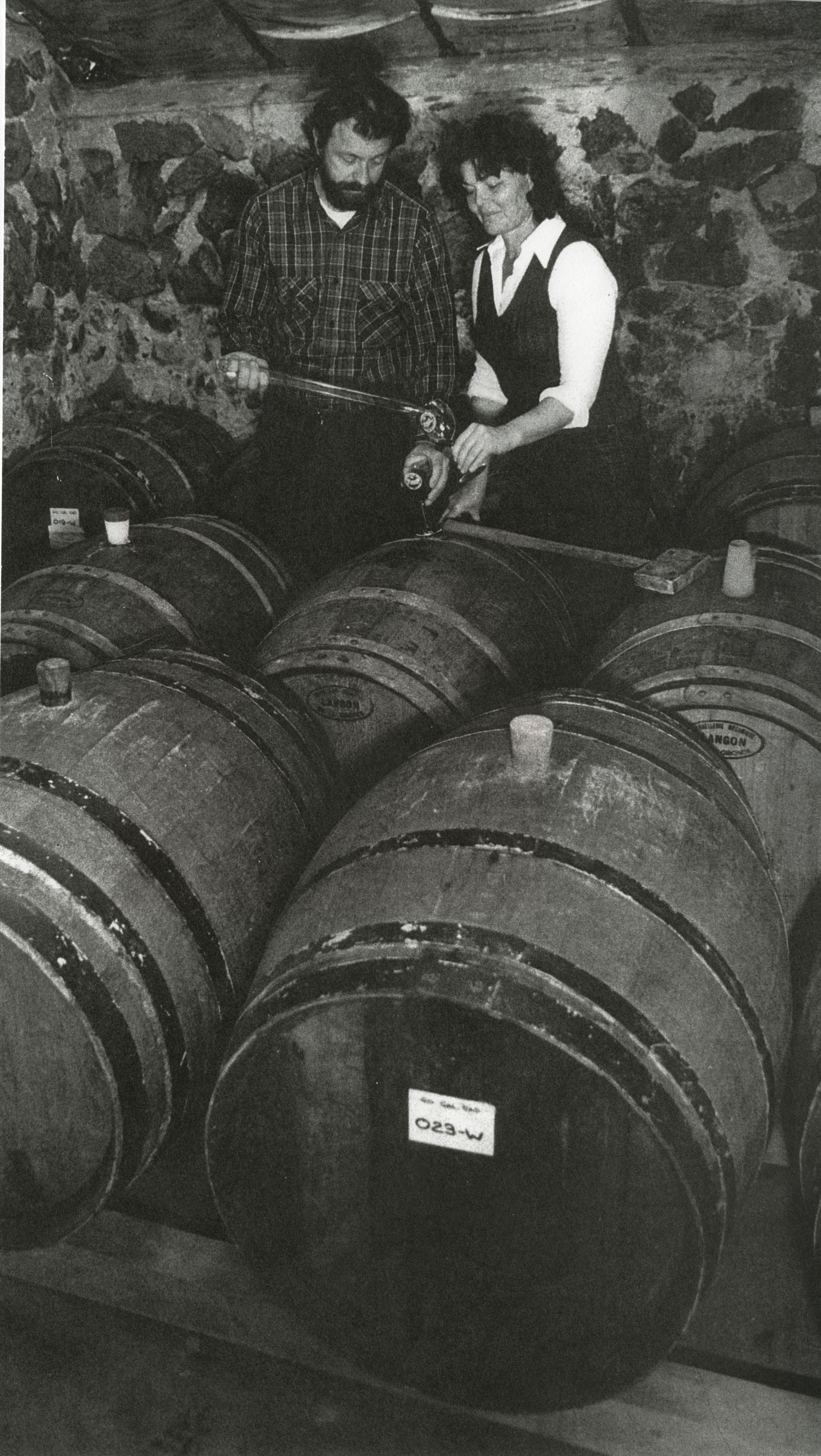
Nancy and Dick Ponzi check a sample from a wine barrel.

After several research trips to Burgundy, Ponzi and her husband moved their family to the Willamette Valley and purchased 20 acres of land southwest of Portland, Oregon, in 1969. They established Ponzi Vineyards in 1970. At the time, there were just four other wineries in the state. The location was close to Portland, an important factor as they expected the city to be their main market. In 1974, they produced their first vintage of 100 cases of Pinot noir and quickly became known as innovators in enology and viticulture. In the early years of the vineyard, Ponzi continued to work as a teacher while also marketing the wine they produced.

The Ponzis planted a two-acre plot of Pinot noir clones in 1975 in a joint venture with Oregon State University to test the clones. In 1981, they purchased a 20-acre parcel that included these two acres, creating their Abetina vineyard (named for the fir trees on the property). The same year they purchased 10 acres downslope from Abetina, which became the Madrona vineyard. Eight acres on the Madrona site were planted with Pinot noir in 1985.

Ponzi Vineyards was among the first to plant Pinot gris commercially in Oregon in 1978, releasing the first bottling in 1984.

In 1991, the Ponzis purchased a 65-acre vineyard named Aurora, which included plantings that used to study stocks, varieties and clones.

In 2008, the Ponzis designed and built a four-level, gravity-flow winery measuring 30,000 square feet. It is noted for its eco-friendliness and high level of sustainability. Ponzi's vineyards are LIVE (Low Input Viticulture & Enology) certified.

=== Bridgeport Brewing ===
Ponzi and her husband also founded Oregon's first craft brewery, Bridgeport Brewing Company, in 1984, a move which is credited with launching the area's craft brewing craze and helping to popularize India Pale Ale in the United States. They sold the brewery in 1995 to The Gambrinus Company.

=== Community work ===
Ponzi was and remains active in community and charitable efforts. She co-founded the Consumers' Food Council, was a founding director of the Washington County Wineries Association and held various offices in the Oregon Winegrowers Association.

She also co-founded the International Pinot Noir Celebration in 1987, a yearly international event that draws thousands of attendees to McMinnville, Oregon.

In 1991, Ponzi partnered with Tuality Healthcare and founded ¡Salud!, an organization that assists vineyard workers and their families with accessing healthcare and provides wellness screenings via a mobile medical unit. She currently serves on Tuality Healthcare's Board of Directors.

She co-founded Oregon Pinot Camp in 2000, an annual trade-education event that attracts wine industry professionals to the Willamette Valley.

=== Other ===
On December 1, 2009, Ponzi published The Ponzi Vineyards Cookbook, a collection of recipes she developed after decades of feeding family, guests and vineyard crews. Interspersed throughout the book are anecdotes about life in the vineyard. She had previously published recipes in The Vintner's Kitchen by Bill King.

== Family ==
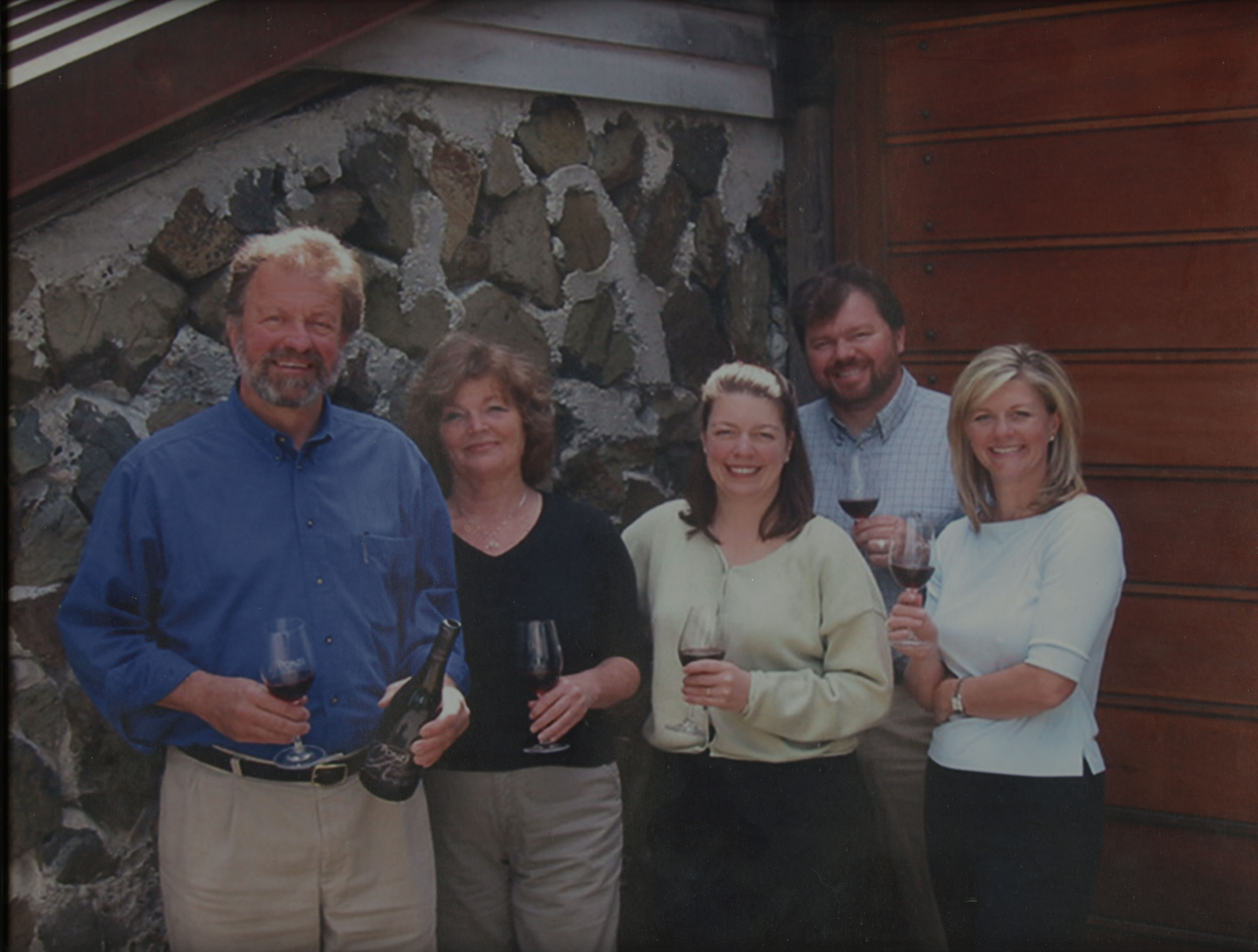
Nancy and Dick Ponzi and their children Luisa, Michel and Anna Maria

Ponzi married Dick Ponzi in 1962 in California.

The entire family was involved in the vineyards and winemaking from the start, with the Ponzi children helping after school and on weekends. Once grown, the children pursued other interests: Michel studied music composition at Dick Grove School of Music before turning his interests to business. He returned to the winery in 1986 where he worked as operations director and later as CEO until 2013. Anna Maria worked in the magazine business on the East Coast before returning to the winery in 1992; Luisa attended Portland State University and prepared for medical school, returning to the family business in 1990 and deciding to pursue winemaking. She went on to train in Burgundy, France, and earn a degree in viticulture and enology. In 1993, Dick Ponzi passed the title and duties of Winemaker to her.

== Awards and recognition ==
In 2007, the Oregon Wine Board awarded Dick and Nancy Ponzi a Lifetime Achievement Award.

== Influence ==
In 1985, Ponzi was among a group that authored a bill that led to the legalization of brewpubs and tasting rooms in Oregon.

== See also ==
- History of Oregon Wine
- Oregon Wine
