= Bhante Dharmawara =

- Born: Bellong Mahathera; February 12, 1889; Phnom Penh, Cambodia, French Indochina
- Died: June 26, 1999 (aged 110 years, 134 days); Stockton, California, U.S.
- Citizenship: Cambodia; United States
- Occupation: Monk
- Known for: First Cambodian American Buddhist monk

Samdach Vira Dharmawara Bellong Mahathera (February 12, 1889 – June 26, 1999), also known simply as Bhante Dharmawara, was a Cambodian-born Theravada monk and teacher who died at the age of 110.

== Biography ==
Dharmawara was born Bellong Mahathera on February 12, 1889, in Phnom Penh, Cambodia to a wealthy family. He was originally a judge but wanted a monastic and celibate life. Dharmawara became a forest monk of the Theravada tradition in his 40s. He was known for his travels throughout Cambodia to India and Sri Lanka using walking as a form of meditation.

He returned to Cambodia to visit in 1952 and established a connection to Norodom Sihanouk, then still king. In 1955, he accompanied Sihanouk to the Bandung Conference in Indonesia.

He first visited the U.S. in late 1955 and early 1956 when he was invited by the US Information Agency to attend a conference on education. In California, the yoga teacher Indra Devi introduced him to wine critic Robert Lawrence Balzer, who was already interested in Asian religions. With Dharmawara's invitation, Balzer traveled to Cambodia and sojourned for two weeks in the temple where Dharmawara was staying, later writing about it in the book Beyond Conflict.

ln 1964, he guided Billy Meier on Buddhist teachings and meditation methods at the "Ashoka Ashram" run by the Indian Buddhist organization "Asoka Mission"

An extended meditation course he taught at the Asoka Mission from October 1974 to March 1975 is described in the book Leaving Lucifer.

In 1989, following a shooting in which five schoolchildren were killed at a Stockton school, there was national press coverage when he went to the school to perform a ritual cleansing of the site.

Dharmawara was a vegetarian and in his later life preferred fresh fruit and vegetable juices. He was also described as loving Coca-Cola.

== Chromotherapy ==
Dharmawara was an advocate of chromotherapy (colour healing). He argued that all things emanate colour and every organ corresponds to a particular colour, thus disease results when a particular bodily organ loses its colour intensity. Chromotherapy would rebuild balance to the body. The colours he advocated were almost exclusively green, blue and yellow. He taught people to avoid the colour red. He argued that green is neutral, harmonizing and used to treat depression, fatigue and trauma whilst yellow a warm colour is used to treat digestive ailments such as constipation, nervous disorders, allergies and fevers. Blue a cold colour was employed as an antibiotic used to cool the body by treating burns and infections. A combination of blue and green are employed to treat bruises and cuts. Similar to Edwin Dwight Babbitt, he would put spring water into a sterilized coloured bottles and place them in the sun for 48 hours.

Dharmawara lectured on chromotherapy and meditation at John G. Bennett's International Academy for Continuous Education located at Sherborne House, Gloucestershire.

== Death ==
He died on June 26, 1999, aged 110.
