= Sam Aaron =

American businessman (1911–1996)

- Born: October 7, 1911
- Died: July 21, 1996 (aged 84)
- Occupation: Wine merchant
- Spouse: Florence Goldberg
- Children: Jane Aaron (animator) and three others

Sam Aaron (October 7, 1911 – July 21, 1996) was a wine merchant and co-founder, with his brother Jack, of Sherry-Lehmann Wines and Spirits. At the end of Prohibition in 1934, Jack Aaron purchased the liquor store in the old Louis Sherry building. He and Sam set about recreating the shop with Sam shifting the emphasis to wine, having been influenced by a meeting with the writer and wine importer, Frank Schoonmaker. In 1946, the shop moved across the street, where it remained until a second move in 2007. Aaron and his brother hired sometime actor and food enthusiast James Beard to run Alanberry's, the gourmet shop next door.

== Biography ==
During the postwar years, Aaron continued to write about wine, now for the popular market: with Beard, he co-authored How to Eat Better for Less Money and with the book critic Clifton Fadiman, he wrote a coffee table book, The Joys of Wine. He was a judge at the New York Wine Tasting of 1973 which featured many of the same French and American wines that would be judged at the Judgment of Paris. In 1984, he was honored by the vignerons of Bordeaux, the shippers of Burgundy, Beaujolais and Champagne with gala parties in each of those regions, in celebration of Sherry-Lehmann's half-century and of Aaron's contributions to the international wine trade.

Jack Aaron died in 1967 and his place in the business was taken by Sam's nephew, Michael Aaron. Sam Aaron retired in 1990. He had four children with Florence Goldberg, one of whom is animator Jane Aaron.
