= BridgePort Brewing Company =

Craft brewery in Oregon

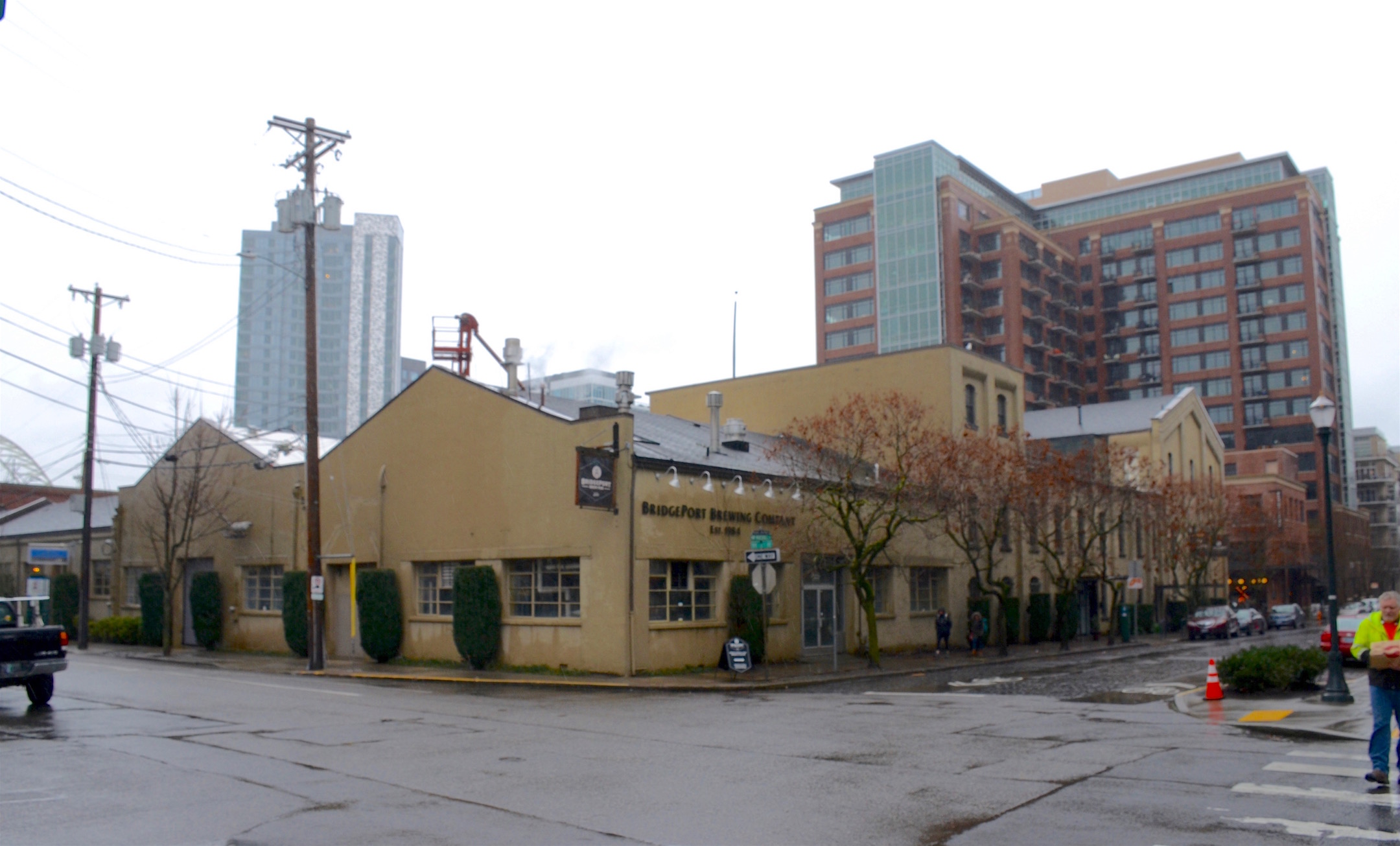
- BridgePort Brewing Company's complex viewed from the southwest in 2019
- Industry: Alcoholic beverage
- Founded: 1984
- Founder: Richard and Nancy Ponzi
- Headquarters: Portland, Oregon, United States; 45.5311°N 122.68474°W
- Products: Beer
- Production output: 100,000 bbls
- Owner: Carlos Alvarez

BridgePort Brewing Company was a brewery in Portland, Oregon, in the United States. It operated from 1984 until 2019. Brewery operations ceased in February 2019, and the brew pub closed on March 10, 2019.

== History ==
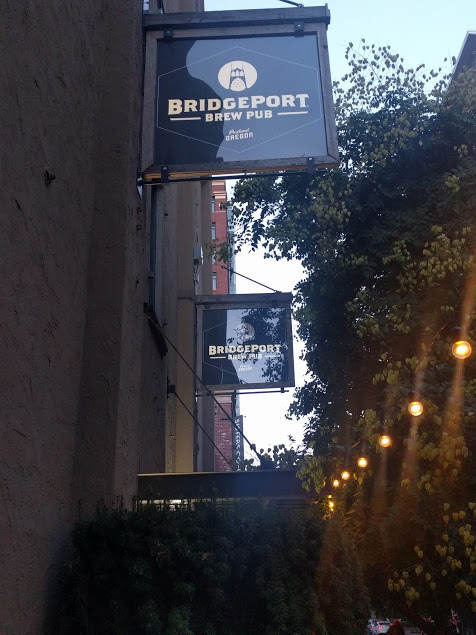
Signs above the entrance to the BridgePort Brewing Company's brewpub in Portland

BridgePort was founded in 1984 by local winemakers Richard and Nancy Ponzi. The brewery claimed in their trademark to be "Oregon's Oldest Craft Brewery". Their first brewer was Karl Ockert. The initial brewing facility, the Columbia River Brewery, had a 600 barrel per year capacity. BridgePort was acquired by the Gambrinus Company, owned by Carlos Alvarez, in 1995, which expanded its capacity in 2001 to 100,000 barrels. BridgePort's beers were distributed to 18 U.S. states. BridgePort beer production in 2005 ranked 41st in the nation; for 2009 beer sales, this ranking fell to number 47.

The building used by BridgePort was built in 1887 and originally housed a rope factory. It is listed on the National Register of Historic Places as the Portland Cordage Company Building.

A fictionalized version of BridgePort appeared in the fifth season of the heist series Leverage in 2012. In the show, the brewery was a front company for the protagonists' elaborate cons. On-location filming included the exterior and some internal transition scenes. In 2012, BridgePort ranked fourth in the state of Oregon for most barrels sold, over 24,000. In 2018, its sales diminished to under 6,200 barrels sold.

In February 2019, the company announce plans to close. Brewery operations ceased that month, and the brew pub closed on March 10, 2019.

== Beers ==
Oregon ranks 4th nationally in craft breweries per capita

The BridgePort India Pale Ale, perhaps the brewery's best known beer, had won a number of awards in the United States and abroad, including a Gold Medal at the 2005 Brewing Industry International Awards, in Munich, Germany; a Gold Medal and Category Champion Trophy at the 2000 Brewing Industry International Awards in London, England; and a Gold Medal for Classic English Style Pale Ale at the Great American Beer Festival, in Denver, Colorado, in 1997.

Blue Heron Pale Ale, named after Portland's official city bird (the great blue heron), was first brewed in 1987 as a special release for the Audubon Society of Portland. The pale ale featured Northwest ingredients, such as hops from the Willamette Valley and malted barley from Eastern Oregon, and won a gold medal at the 2006 World Beer Cup.

Bridgeport brewed a barleywine named "Old Knucklehead" where a "Knucklehead" was inaugurated every few years. Bottling "no. 11" featured Portland beer writer Fred Eckhardt.

== See also ==
- Beer in the United States
