= Trefethen Vineyards =

Winery in Napa Valley, California

Trefethen Family Vineyards
- Location: Napa, California, USA
- Appellation: Oak Knoll District of Napa Valley AVA
- Formerly: Eshcol
- Founded: 1968
- First vintage: 1973
- Key people: John, Janet, Lorenzo & Hailey Trefethen; Jon Ruel, President; Bryan Kays, Winemaker; David Whitehouse, Winemaster
- Known for: Estate grown Cabernet Sauvignon
- Varietals: Cabernet Sauvignon, Chardonnay, Merlot, Riesling, Pinot Noir, Cabernet Franc, Malbec, Sauvignon Blanc, Red Blend, Petit Verdot
- Other products: Olive Oil, Fig Jam, Orange Marmalade
- Distribution: national, restaurants
- Tasting: open to public
- Eshcol Winery
- U.S. National Register of Historic Places
- Location within California Location within the United States
- Location: 1160 Oak Knoll Ave., Napa, California
- Coordinates: 38°21′38″N 122°19′53″W
- Area: less than one acre
- Built: 1886
- Built by: Hamden W. McIntyre
- NRHP reference No.: 87001155
- Added to NRHP: July 16, 1987
- Website: http://www.trefethen.com

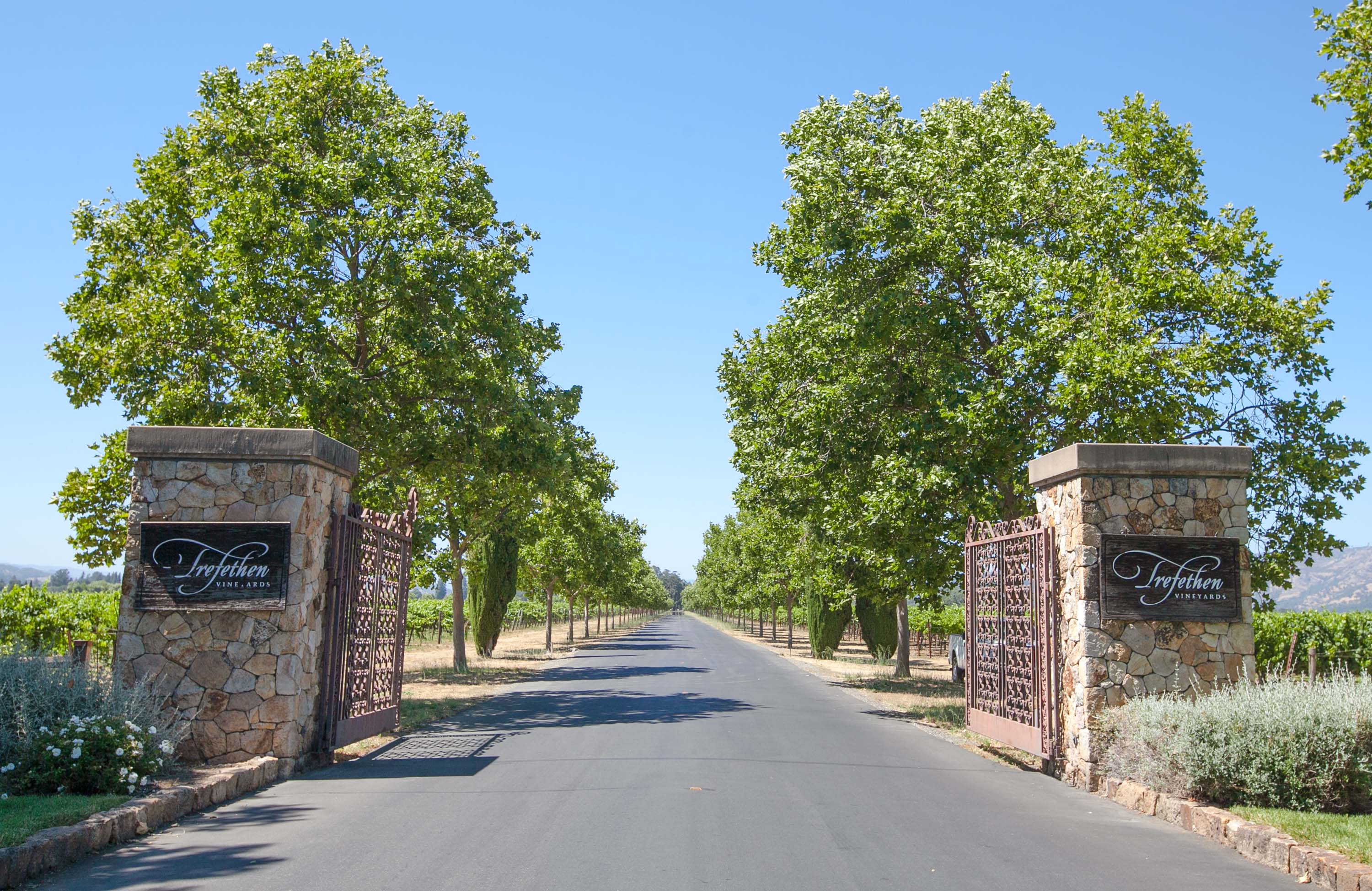
Trefethen Vineyards

Trefethen Family Vineyards is a winery in Napa Valley. It was established in 1968.

== History ==
Part of the current company's vineyards can be traced back to the winery Eshcol, a biblical word for “lush cluster of grapes.” The original Eschol winery was commissioned by James and George Goodman and constructed in 1886 by a Scottish sea captain named Hamden McIntyre. The original estate was 280 acres with 40 acres planted in vineyards. McIntyre designed it as a gravity-flow system: a horse-drawn winch brought grapes to the third floor of the three-story structure for crushing; gravity carried the juice to the second floor for fermenting; and, eventually, the wine descended to the first floor for aging. The vineyards survived Prohibition in the United States by producing grapes for the production of sacramental wine. By 1940, the vineyards and winery building fell into disuse. The Eschol building suffered extensive structural damage from the 2014 South Napa earthquake. The winery building was restored from earthquake damage following over two years of repairs and improvements.

Following retirement from a successful career with Kaiser Industries, Eugene Trefethen along with his wife Katie purchased Eshcol in 1968 along with six adjoining properties to create Trefethen Vineyards. At that time, replanting of the vineyards and restoration of the historic winery building began. The Trefethens' restoration efforts were recognized in 1988 by the Department of the Interior, which placed the winery on the National Register of Historic Places as the only 19th-century, wooden, gravity-flow winery surviving in Napa County. The winery is also known for an extensive garden established by Katie. It has been featured in many publications and has been a destination for many gardening enthusiasts since it was created.

A grape vineyard at Trefethen

Eugene Trefethen died in 1996 and Katie Trefethen died in 2007.

== Awards ==
In 1979, a Wine Olympics was organized by the French wine and food magazine, Gault Millau. A total of 330 wines from 33 countries were evaluated by 62 experts from ten countries. The 1976 Trefethen Vineyards Chardonnay won first place in that category and was judged best in the world. The French wine establishment was so disturbed that they challenged a rematch which took place in Burgundy on January 8, 1980. The result was another win for the Trefethen '76 Chardonnay besting the second place Puligny-Montrachet. Gault-Millau's "Le Nouveau Guide" later stated that "Nul ne voudrait mettre en cause la belle victoire du Trefethen Chardonnay (The fine victory of the Trefethen Chardonnay should not be questioned)."

== Sources ==
- Trefethen Vineyards
- Trefethen Vineyards Reviews
