= Jane Aaron =

American filmmaker and book illustrator (1948–2015)

- Born: April 16, 1948; Manhattan, New York, US
- Died: June 27, 2015 (aged 67); Manhattan, New York, US
- Education: High School of Music & Art; Boston University
- Occupations: Filmmaker and children's book illustrator
- Spouse: Skip Blumberg (m. 1988)
- Children: 1
- Relatives: Sam Aaron (father)
- Writing career
- Notable works: Between the Lions, Sesame Street

Jane Frances Aaron (April 16, 1948 – June 27, 2015) was an American filmmaker and children's book illustrator, best known for her work on Between the Lions and Sesame Street. Aaron mixed live-action shots and animated images to teach children the alphabet, counting skills, and opposites, such as front and back or full and empty.

== Early life and education ==
Aaron was born April 16, 1948, in Manhattan, New York City, to Jewish parents Sam Aaron and Florence (née Goldberg). She attended the High School of Music & Art and graduated from Boston University with a bachelor's degree in fine arts.

== Career ==
In addition to her animation work, Aaron illustrated the When I'm... book series written by Barbara Gardiner. She also worked with Oralee Wachter on two films about child sexual abuse and prevention, No More Secrets for Me and Close to Home. The films were later made into books illustrated by Aaron.

Aaron's independent films have been shown at the Whitney Biennial and the Museum of Modern Art. Permanent collections of her work exist at the Museum of Modern Art, the Metropolitan Museum of Art, the Hirshhorn Museum and Sculpture Garden and the Walker Art Center. She received a Guggenheim Fellowship in 1985.

== Personal life ==
Aaron married Skip Blumberg on January 17, 1988, with whom she had one son, Timothy Aaron.

She died of cancer in Manhattan on June 27, 2015, aged 67.
