= Portland Cordage Company Building =

Historic building in Portland, Oregon, U.S.

- U.S. National Register of Historic Places
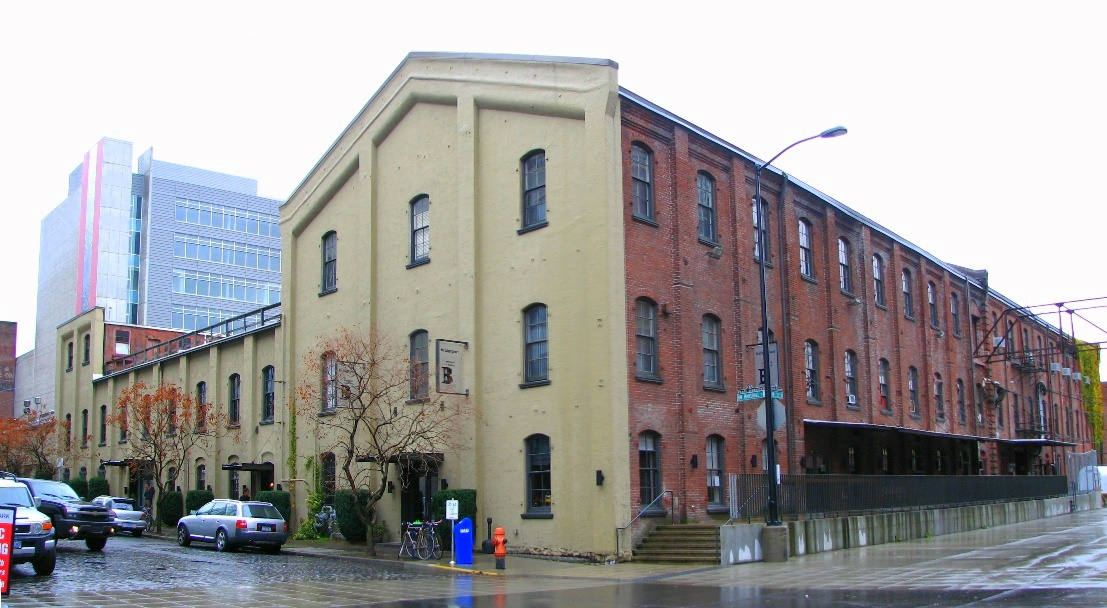

- Location within Portland, Oregon
- Location: 1313 NW Marshall St. Portland, Oregon
- Coordinates: 45.53101°N 122.68496°W
- Built: 1887
- Architectural style: Italianate, Industrial Italianate
- NRHP reference No.: 93000018
- Added to NRHP: February 11, 1993

The Portland Cordage Company Building is a building complex located in Northwest Portland, Oregon. It has been listed on the National Register of Historic Places since 1993.

== Description ==
The building is made of red brick and stucco, with a stone foundation and asphalt roof. It is a Late Victorian/Italianate style industrial building. The complex contains six buildings, one of which formerly housed the actual cordage factory.

It is located about five blocks from the Willamette River.

== History ==
1911 advertisement for the Portland Cordage Company

The Portland Cordage Company was a manufacturer of cordage, including rope, twine, and yarn. It was established in 1887 by W. B. Ayer, Henry W. Corbett, Henry Failing, and W. L. Ladd. Samuel M. Mears became president of the company in 1896. It was the largest cord manufacturer in the Pacific Northwest and had a second branch in Seattle. The company closed in 1941.

From 1984 to 2019, the building housed BridgePort Brewing Company.

== See also ==
- History of Portland, Oregon
- National Register of Historic Places listings in Northwest Portland, Oregon
