= Ponzio =

Ponzio is a surname. Notable people with this surname include:

- Augusto Ponzio (born 1942), Italian semiologist and philosopher
- Ben Ponzio (born 1975), American poker player
- Facundo Ponzio (born 1995), Argentinian footballer
- Flaminio Ponzio (1560–1613), Italian architect
- Jean-Michel Ponzio (born 1967), French illustrator
- Leonardo Ponzio (born 1982), Argentinian footballer
- Melissa Ponzio (born 1972), American actress
- Pietro Pontio (1532–1596), Italian composer
