= Richard Sommer (winemaker) =

Oregon winemaker

Richard Sommer (17 August 1929 - 28 July 2009) was an American winemaker, considered the father of the Oregon wine industry.

== Biography ==
Sommer was born in San Francisco to Hermann and Elizabeth Sommer, a chemist and microbiologist, respectively.

He attended the University of California, Davis in 1948 and later moved to Douglas County, Oregon to pursue fine winemaking. First, he found employment in the county assessor's office and in 1961 established Hillcrest vineyards on 20 acres of land near the Callahan Ridge. Sommer came north to primarily produce Pinot Noir and Riesling, but in addition planted a number of other varieties including Malbec, Sauvignon Blanc, Semilliion, Chardonnay, Grenache, Barbera etc. Later Richard would be recognized as the first to plant (1961) and produce (1967) Pinot Noir in Oregon. All of these cuttings had been collected in 1959, from Louis Martini's Stanly Ranch Vineyard in Carneros, California with the exception of Zinfandel which had been sourced locally from the Doerner family who had come to the Umpqua Valley from Nap in the 1880s.

Sommer sold Hillcrest Vineyards in 2003 to Dyson and Susan DeMara.
