= Robert Lawrence Balzer =

American wine journalist (1912 – 2011)

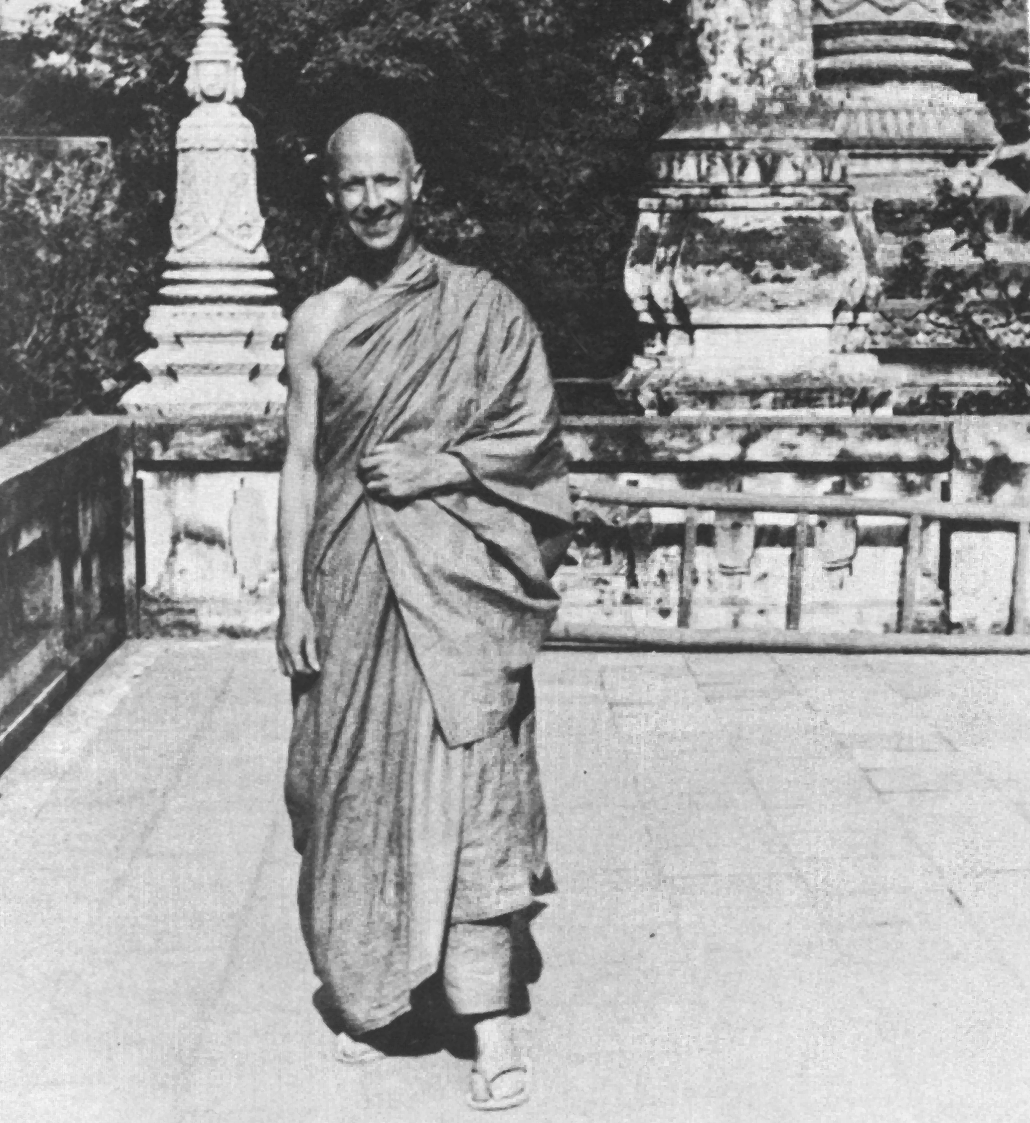
- Born: June 25, 1912; Des Moines, Iowa
- Died: December 2, 2011 (aged 99) Orange, California, U.S.
- Occupation: Journalist

Robert Lawrence Balzer (June 25, 1912 – December 2, 2011) was a wine journalist in the United States.

== Early life ==
Balzer was born on June 25, 1912, in Des Moines, Iowa. At the age of 24, he was put in charge of the wine department of his family’s grocery/gourmet market in Los Angeles, California. He promoted wine in his customer newsletter and was asked by Will Rogers, Jr. to write a regular wine column in his local newspaper in 1937.

== Career ==
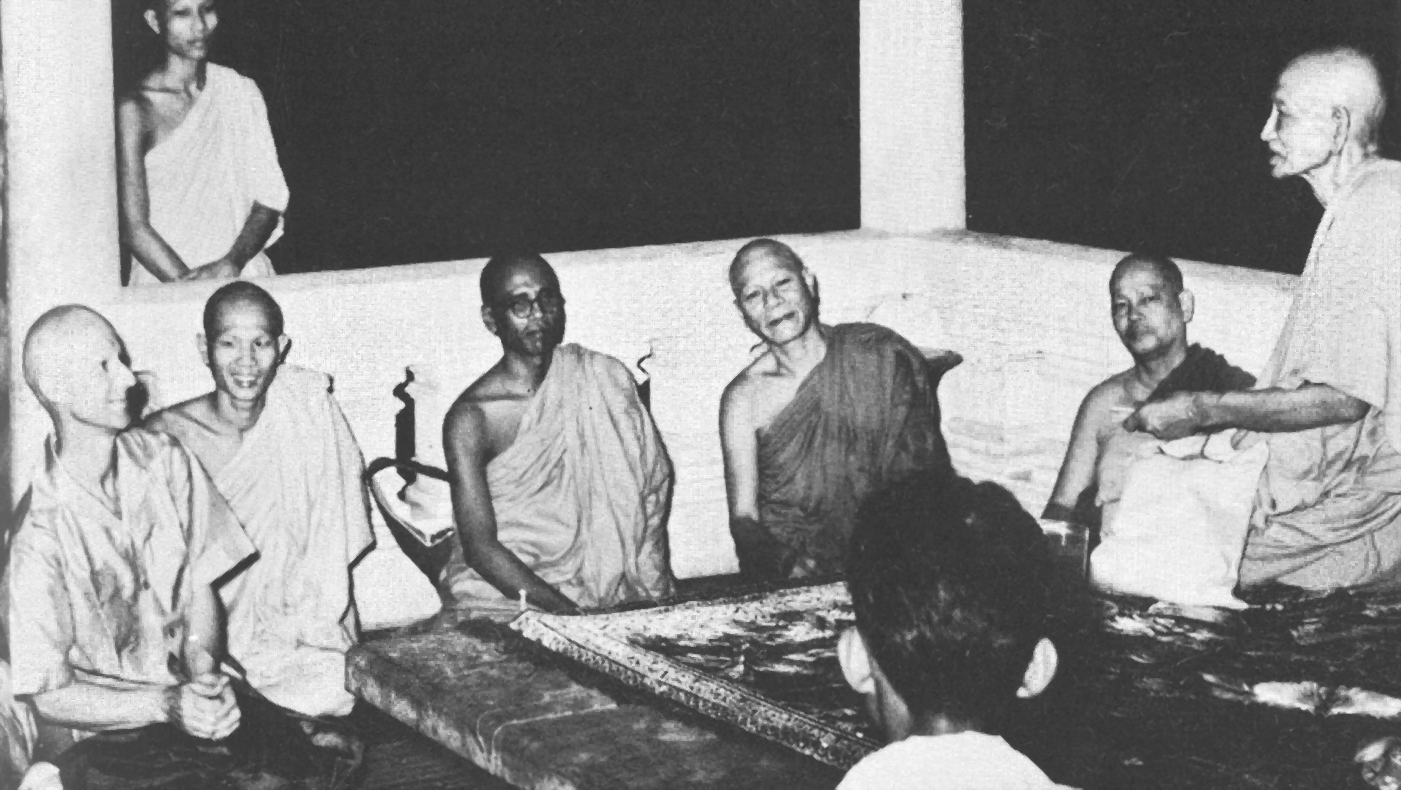
Cambodia's Buddhist elite before Balzer's (left) ordination. He is speaking to the Samdech Dhammalikket (right; *?1873, of Wat Langka, វត្តលង្ការ), seated between are his preceptor Bhante Dharmawara (1889-1999; 2nd from right) next to him in the corner is: Indanano Phul Tés (1891–1966).

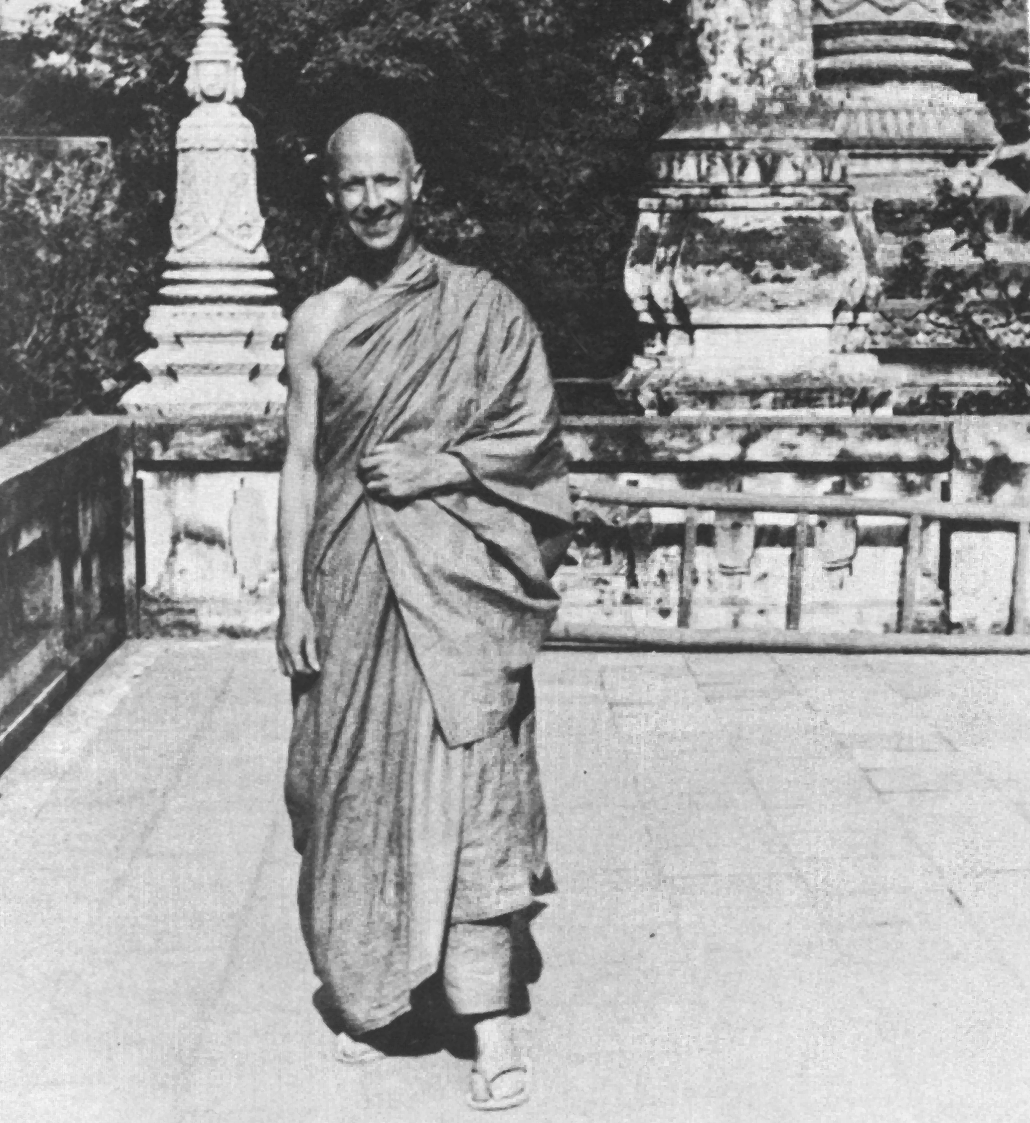
Balzer as Buddhist monk in Wat Phrachumsagar, March 1955.

In 1948, Robert Lawrence Balzer published California’s Best Wines, marking the first of his eleven books. His writing on wine included articles for Travel Holiday magazine for over twenty years, a weekly column in the Los Angeles Times Magazine for three decades, and the Private Guide to Food and Wine. He also hosted a daily radio program called A Word on Wine on Los Angeles’ KFAC station. His final book, Hollywood and Wine, featured personal stories about his interactions with Hollywood celebrities and wine experts.

In the 1950s, Balzer worked for United Press in Asia while also producing propaganda for the US Information Service. After covering the coronation of Norodom Suramarit in March 1955, he was invited to stay for twelve days at the Wat Phrachumsagar temple in Cambodia, where he was ordained by Buddhist monk Bhante Dharmawara. Later, in 1955, Bhante Dharmawara was brought to the U.S. by the USIA.

Balzer also worked on a similar assignment in Japan in late 1959, during a time of heightened tensions between Japan and the U.S. after the AMPO riots. He reported on Zen and the 101-year-old abbot of Hōkō-ji (Shizuoka), Shizan, in an effort to present a positive image of Japan.

In 1973, Balzer organized the New York Wine Tasting, which helped pave the way for the famous 1976 Judgment of Paris, where French and Californian wines were compared. He brought together fourteen prominent wine experts for the event, including winemaker Alexis Lichine and wine merchant Sam Aaron.

Balzer also played a role in overseeing the food and wine arrangements for the presidential inaugurations of Ronald Reagan in 1981 and 1985, and for George H. W. Bush in 1989. He had friendships with several notable Hollywood figures, including Cecil B. DeMille, Alfred Hitchcock, Marlon Brando, Ingrid Bergman, Olivia De Havilland, and Gloria Swanson.

== Selected books ==
- California's Best Wines (1948)
- The Pleasures of Wine (1964)
- Balzer’s Book of Wines and Spirits (1973)
- Wines of California (1978)

== Death ==
Balzer died on December 2, 2011, in Orange, California, at the age of 99 from natural causes.

== Legacy ==
In 2018, Christine Graham, a contributing editor to The Underground Wineletter, published Hollywood and Wine — A Star Studded Life, The Robert Lawrence Balzer Story - a completed autobiography of Balzer.

== See also ==
- List of wine personalities
