= David Lett =

American winemaker

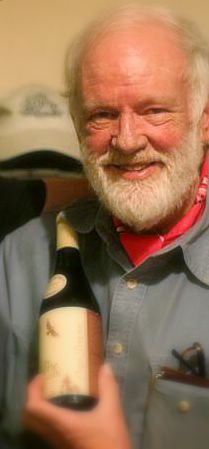
David Lett, owner-winemaker at The Eyrie Vineyards in Oregon with a bottle of the 1975 Eyrie Vineyards South Block Reserve—the bottle that put Oregon on the world's Pinot noir map.

David Lett (1939 – October 9, 2008) was the founder and winemaker for The Eyrie Vineyards in the U.S. state of Oregon. He was a pioneer in the Oregon wine industry.

Lett grew up on a farm in Holladay, Utah earned a degree in philosophy and pre-med at the University of Utah. In 1964, he graduated from UC-Davis with a degree in winemaking and grape growing, and a mission to find an appropriate place to grow Pinot noir outside of Burgundy. In early 1965, against the advice of the professors at the University of California, Davis, he moved to Oregon and planted the first Pinot noir, Chardonnay and related vinifera wine varieties in the Willamette Valley. In 1966, he and his wife Diana purchased hillside acreage near Dundee, a small city about 45 minutes south of Portland, and named it The Eyrie Vineyards, after a nest of hawks at the top of the vineyard. They made their first Pinot noir in 1970.

The Eyrie Vineyards 1975 South Block Reserve Pinot Noir shocked much of the wine world when it showed very well in the Wine Olympiad ("Wine Olympics"), first in Paris in 1979 and then in Burgundy the following year. In a retirement farewell to David Lett, this wine and every other reserve Pinot noir were poured in a special vertical tasting at the winery in July 2008. The winery itself is in McMinnville.

Lett died on October 9, 2008.
