= Wine Olympics =

A Wine Olympics was organized by the French food and wine magazine Gault-Millau in 1979. A total of 330 wines from 33 countries were evaluated by 62 experts from ten nationalities. The 1976 contestant Trefethen Vineyards Chardonnay from Napa Valley won the Chardonnay tasting and was judged best in the world. Gran Coronas Mas La Plana 1970 from Spain received first place in the Cabernet Sauvignon blend category. In the Pinot noir competition, the 1975 Eyrie Vineyards Reserve from Oregon placed in the top ten. The 1975 HMR Pinot Noir from Paso Robles placed third. Tyrell's Pinot Noir 1976 from Australia was selected for the Gault-Millau World Dozen and placed first.

The New York Times did note the limitations of this competition, in that it "did not pretend to include all or even most of the world's best wines."

== See also ==
- Wine competition
- Blind tasting of wine
- 1976 Judgment of Paris
