= The Eyrie Vineyards =

American winery in Oregon

- Location: McMinnville, Oregon, U.S.
- Coordinates: 45.2143°N 123.1884°W
- Appellation: Willamette Valley AVA
- Founded: 1965
- First vintage: 1970
- Key people: David Lett
- Known for: Pinot noir Original Vines
- Varietals: Pinot gris, Pinot noir, Pinot blanc, Pinot Meunier, Chardonnay, Melon de Bourgogne, Trousseau noir, Muscat Ottonel
- Distribution: United States, Canada, England, Japan, Korea
- Website: eyrievineyards.com

The Eyrie Vineyards is an American winery in Oregon that consists of 60 acres (24 ha) in five different vineyards in the Dundee Hills AVA of the Willamette Valley. In 1965, against the advice of his viticultural professors at the University of California, Davis, David Lett moved to Oregon to plant Pinot noir in the Willamette Valley. David and Diana Lett produced the first Pinot noir in the Willamette Valley, and the first Pinot gris in the United States. Their first vintage was in 1970.

The 1975 Eyrie Vineyards Reserve Pinot Noir placed in top ten among Pinot noirs in blind tasting at the Wine Olympics in 1979.

Burgundy winemaker Robert Drouhin organized a rematch at Maison Joseph Drouhin in France. The 1975 Eyrie Vineyards Reserve came in second, losing to Drouhin's 1959 Chambolle-Musigny by only two-tenths of a point. Drouhin later purchased land in Oregon and built Domaine Drouhin Oregon.

Over the years, David Lett (known locally as "Papa Pinot") maintained a light-handed style of Pinot noir that did not follow the trend toward greater flavor, tannin, and color extraction, believing color not to be an indicator of quality in Pinot noir. This put him at odds with some of the wine critics. David Lett died on October 9, 2008. David and Diana's son Jason Lett is now president and winemaker for the winery.

The Eyrie Vineyards estate vineyards are part of the sub-American Viticultural Area (AVA) of Willamette Valley AVA known as the Dundee Hills. The winery itself is in McMinnville, which annually hosts the International Pinot Noir Celebration on the last weekend in July on the campus of Linfield College.
