= Oregon Wine Board =

Government agency regulating the wine industry in Oregon, U.S.

The Oregon Wine Board (OWB) is a semi-independent agency of the government of the U.S. state of Oregon that promotes development of the Oregon wine industry, and coordinates both domestic and export marketing efforts for the industry. The nine-member board is appointed by the Governor of Oregon, is supported financially by a tax on wine grapes produced in the state and the sale of Oregon wines in the state. The taxes are collected on its behalf by the Oregon Liquor and Cannabis Commission (OLCC), and receives administrative support from the Oregon Department of Consumer and Business Services. Having no regulatory authority, it recommends labelling standards for wines grown and bottled within the state to the OLCC.

OWB was formed in 2003 by the Oregon Legislative Assembly to replace the Oregon Wine Advisory Board of the Oregon Department of Agriculture. The restructuring was part of Governor Ted Kulongoski's Brand Oregon initiative to improve Oregon's economy through partnerships between the public and private sectors to better promote the state's products and tourism. After signing the bill creating OWB into law, he appointed vineyard and winery owners to all nine positions on the board. The newly constituted agency's position independent of the agriculture department permitted it to expand its budget through private sources, and recruit an executive director unhampered by agency salary caps.

The OWB has offices in Portland. Tom Danowski was appointed executive director of both organizations by the board in December 2011.

== See also ==
- List of Oregon wineries and vineyards
- Oregon Tourism Commission
