= Beverly, Washington AVA =

American Viticultural Area in Washington

Coordinates: 46°53′14″N 119°53′34″W

Beverly, Washington
- Wine region
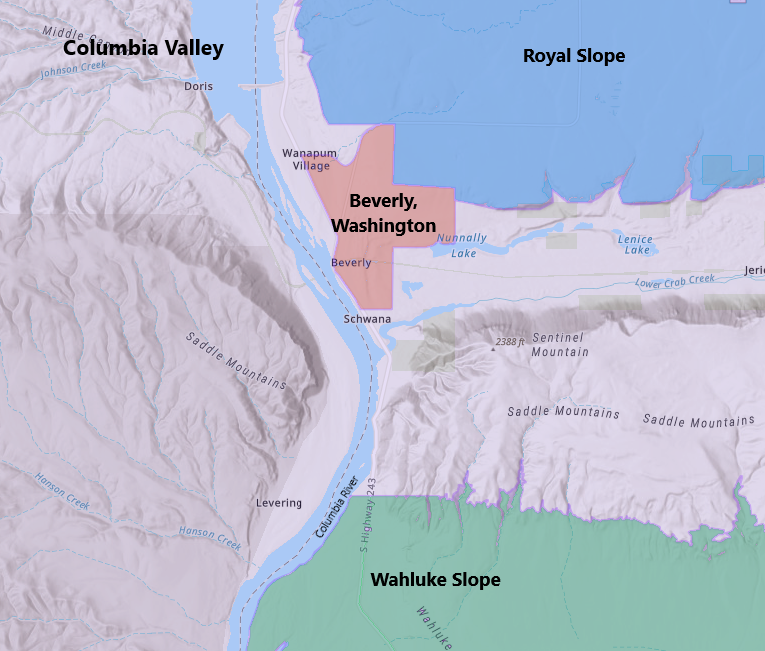
- Type: American Viticultural Area
- Year established: 2024
- Country: United States
- Part of: Washington, Columbia Valley AVA
- Other regions in Washington, Columbia Valley AVA: Ancient Lakes of Columbia Valley AVA, Candy Mountain AVA, Columbia Hills AVA, Goose Gap AVA, Horse Heaven Hills AVA, Naches Heights AVA. Lake Chelan AVA, Rattlesnake Hills AVA, Red Mountain AVA, Royal Slope AVA, Snipes Mountain AVA, The Burn of Columbia Valley AVA, Wahluke Slope AVA, Walla Walla Valley AVA, White Bluffs AVA, Yakima Valley AVA
- Growing season: 150 days
- Climate region: Region IV
- Heat units: 2,816 to 3,593 GDD units
- Precipitation (annual average): Less than 15 in (381 mm)
- Soil conditions: Wind-deposited sand and silt overlying cobblestone gravel over crystalline basement bedrock rich in silica, quartz, and mica
- Total area: 2,415 acres (4 sq mi)
- Size of planted vineyards: 400 acres (160 ha)
- No. of vineyards: 2
- Grapes produced: Cabernet Sauvignon, Cabernet Franc, Malbec, Merlot
- No. of wineries: 1

Beverly, Washington is an American Viticultural Area (AVA) located within Grant County encompassing the towns of Beverly between Wanapum Village and Schwana in central Washington state along the banks of the Columbia River. It was established as the nation's 276^{th}, the state's 21^{st} and the county's fifth wine appellation on October 29, 2024 by the Alcohol and Tobacco Tax and Trade Bureau (TTB), Treasury after reviewing the petition submitted by Whitman College professor and geologist, Dr. Kevin Pogue, on behalf of the Zirkle Fruit Company, and Tom Merkle and Craig Young, owners of the two vineyards within the region, to propose a viticultural area named "Wanapum Village."

During the review period, TTB received a request from the petitioner asking to change the original proposed AVA name from "Wanapum Village" to "Beverly, Washington." The petitioner stated that members of the Wanapum tribe expressed concerns about the use of their name for an viticultural area. The petitioner included sufficient name evidence to support the proposed name change. As a result of the request, TTB published Notice No. 219A in the Federal Register on October 5, 2023 (88 FR 69113), proposing to change the name of the proposed Wanapum Village AVA to "Beverly, Washington." No other changes to the proposed AVA were included in Notice No. 219A. Prior to the comment period closing on December 4, 2023, TTB received one comment in response to Notice No. 219A. The anonymous public comment expressed support for use of the name "Beverly, Washington" for the AVA, based both on respect for the Wanapum tribe regarding use of their name and "Beverly" being a common name used in the local community to describe the region.

Beverly, Washington viticultural area shares a border with the southwest corner of the Royal Slope AVA and lies a few miles north up the river from the Wahluke Slope AVA. The 2,415 acres (4 sq mi) is the seventeen sub-appellation entirely within the vast 11,264,000-acre (17,600 sq mi) Columbia Valley AVA.

== Terroir ==
=== Topography ===
Low, rolling hills with gentle to moderate slopes characterize the topography of the Beverly, Washington AVA. The AVA elevations range from 515 to 950 feet (157–290 m) with the average approximately 600 feet (180 m). By contrast, to the north and northeast of the AVA, the terrain of the established Royal Slope AVA consists of a single gentle incline that rises to the summit of the Frenchman Hills at 1,756 feet (535 m). To the south of the AVA is Sentinel Gap, a 1,500-foot (460 m) deep by 1.5 miles (2.4 km) wide, rugged, cliff-walled canyon carved by the Columbia River. The gap forms a natural geographic barrier between the Beverly, Washington AVA and the gently-sloping terrain of the established Wahluke Slope AVA. To the immediate west of the AVA is the relatively narrow floodplain of the Columbia River, which, according to the USGS maps included in the petition, has elevations between 500 and 530 feet (150 and 160 m). According to the petition, the topography of the AVA affects viticulture. The proximity to Sentinel Gap increases wind speeds within the AVA, as the canyon funnels wind into it. High winds can reduce mildew pressure on the vines and also promote the development of smaller grapes with thicker skins than are found on the same varietals grown in less windy conditions. Additionally, because the AVA has lower elevations than the neighboring Wahluke Slope and Royal Slope AVAs, the entire Beverly, Washington AVA was repeatedly inundated by ice-age floodwaters that reached a maximum depth of 1,250 feet (380 m). The water flowed at a relatively high velocity, depositing coarse-grained sediments that formed the basis for the soils in the AVA, compared to the finer clays and silts that were deposited at higher elevations outside Beverly, Washington AVA.

=== Climate ===
Generally, the Columbia Valley AVA typically has a growing season of greater than 150 days, growing degree-days exceeding 2000, and average annual precipitation of less than 15 inches. These criteria apply to the area included within the Beverly, Washington AVA boundaries. The petition included data on the average growing season temperature, average maximum temperature, growing degree day (GDD) accumulation, average wind speed, and maximum wind speed for one location in the AVA, three locations in the established Royal Slope AVA (north and east of the AVA), and three locations in the established Wahluke Slope AVA (south of the AVA). The petition did not include data for the region to the west of the AVA. According to the data in the tables, the Beverly, Washington AVA has a higher average growing season temperature and accumulates more GDDs than any of the weather station locations within the established Royal Slope AVA. The climate of the Beverly, Washington AVA is warm and windy. The weather station in the AVA also had higher average and maximum wind speeds than any station in the Royal Slope AVA. The data suggests that temperatures in the established Wahluke Slope AVA are more varied than in the AVA, with one station reporting very similar temperatures and GDD accumulations (Desert Aire), one reporting slightly lower temperatures and GDD accumulations (Mattawa), and one reporting slightly warmer temperatures and GDD accumulations (Wahluke Slope). However, the average and maximum wind speeds in the AVA are consistently higher than in the Wahluke Slope AVA, with the exception of the 2015, 2016, and 2018 average wind speeds for the Wahluke Slope station. According to the petition, the warm temperatures and high GDD accumulations within the Beverly, Washington AVA mean that vineyard owners are able to plant warmer-climate cultivars that require more heat to ripen. Additionally, cooler climate grape varietals planted in the AVA will ripen faster and accumulate more sugars than the same varietals planted in the cooler Royal Slope AVA.

=== Soils ===
The coarse-grained soils of the Beverly, Washington AVA are developed from sand and gravel deposited by ice-age floods mixed with wind-deposited sand. The four main soil series dominating the AVA are the Burbank, Winchester, Schwana, and Quincy series. All of those soil series are described as excessively or somewhat excessively well-drained. The petition states that the AVA soils are much coarser than the soils in the neighboring Royal Slope AVA, which is located to the north and east of the AVA. In soil samples taken from both the AVA and the established Royal Slope AVA, only one percent of the weight of the soil sample from the Royal Slope AVA consisted of medium to coarse grains, compared to 46 percent of the sample from the Beverly, Washington AVA. The petition also notes that soils in the established Royal Slope AVA formed primarily in fine-grained slackwater sediments overlain by wind-deposited silt, and less than 2 percent of the soils derived from "‘outburst sands and gravels" such as those found in the AVA. To the immediate south of the AVA, in Sentinel Gap, the soils are defined as "rubble land-rock outcrop complex." These soils are generally considered unsuitable for agriculture. Farther south of the AVA, within the established Wahluke Slope AVA, the soils are similar to those of the Beverly, Washington AVA. The petition did not include information on soils to the west of the AVA. The soils of the Beverly, Washington AVA have an effect on viticulture. Coarse-grained, excessively well-drained soils require more irrigation water and more easily promote vine stress than finer-grained soils. Vines planted in coarse-textured soils often have deeper roots since water has a greater tendency to move vertically through the profile. Coarse soils are less susceptible to erosion than soils formed in silt and fine sand, so cover crops are not critical and are not currently used in the vineyards of the AVA. Finally, the petition notes that coarse-textured soils without cover crops warm faster than fine-grained soils that use cover crops. The warmer soils promote earlier onset of phenological stages in grapes, such as bud break and veraison.
