= Rocky Reach AVA =

Viticultural area in Washington, USA

Coordinates: 47°46′08″N 120°08′30″W

Rocky Reach
- Wine region
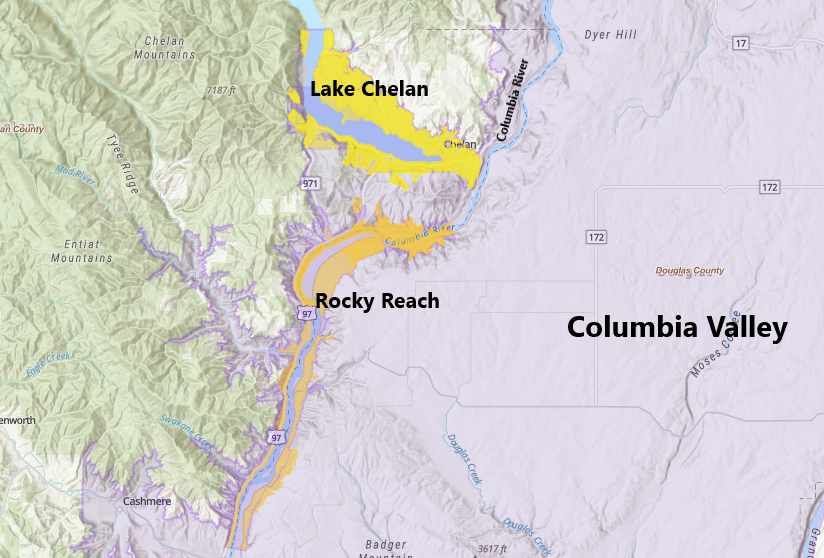
- Type: American Viticultural Area
- Year established: 2022
- Years of wine industry: 16
- Country: United States
- Part of: Washington, Columbia Valley AVA
- Other regions in Washington, Columbia Valley AVA: Ancient Lakes of Columbia Valley AVA, Beverly, Washington AVA, Candy Mountain AVA, Goose Gap AVA, Horse Heaven Hills AVA, Naches Heights AVA. Lake Chelan AVA, Rattlesnake Hills AVA, Red Mountain AVA, Royal Slope AVA, Snipes Mountain AVA, The Burn of Columbia Valley AVA, Wahluke Slope AVA, Walla Walla Valley AVA, White Bluffs AVA, Yakima Valley AVA
- Growing season: 150 days
- Climate region: Region II-III
- Heat units: 2818 GDD units
- Precipitation (annual average): 11 in (279 mm)
- Soil conditions: Wind-deposited sand and silt overlying cobblestone gravel over crystalline basement bedrock rich in silica, quartz, and mica
- Total area: 32,000 acres (50 sq mi)
- Size of planted vineyards: 117 acres (47 ha)
- No. of vineyards: 7
- Grapes produced: Cabernet Sauvignon, Cabernet Franc, Grenache, Malbec, Carmenere, Mourvedre, Merlot, Sauvignon Blanc, Semillon, Marsanne, Rousanne, Viognier, Muscat Blanc à Petits Grains, Syrah
- No. of wineries: 1

Rocky Reach is an American Viticultural Area (AVA) located within portions of Chelan and Douglas Counties between the cities Chelan and Wenatchee in central Washington state. The area is an elongated strip of land that straddles the Columbia River entirely within the vast Columbia Valley AVA. The wine region was established as the nation's 265^{th}, the state's twentieth and Columbia Valley's seventeenth appellation on June 3, 2022 by the Alcohol and Tobacco Tax and Trade Bureau (TTB), Treasury after reviewing the petition submitted by Whitman College professor and geologist, Dr. Kevin Pogue, on behalf of regional winemakers and vineyard owners, proposing a viticultural area named "Rocky Reach."

The name "Rocky Reach" originated from 19th-century nautical nomenclature where steamboat captains navigating the Columbia River describe the rapids in a particularly rocky "stretch" or "reach" of the river. The AVA encompasses 32,000 acres (50 sq mi) with the Columbia River and the Rocky Reach Reservoir constituting approximately 24 percent of the total area. There are 7 commercial vineyards with approximately 117 acres (47 ha) under vine with a sole winery.

== Terroir ==
=== Topography ===
The distinguishing features of the Rocky Reach AVA are its topography, geology, soils, and climate. Rocky Reach AVA is located along a stretch of the Columbia River where the river has eroded a deep canyon between the foothills of the Cascade Range to the west and the Waterville Plateau and Badger Mountain to the east. Elevations within the AVA are below 1,600 ft (488 m). Near the floor of the canyon and along the canyon sides are flat-topped terraces. According to the petition, the terraces within the AVA have long been used for agricultural purposes, including viticulture, due to the ease of farming on the nearly level ground. West of the Rocky Reach. the terrain is rugged and mountainous and elevations rise rapidly to over 3,000 ft (914 m). To the east of the viticultural area, elevations are also higher, rising to an average of 2,500 ft (762 m) on the Waterville Plateau. According to the petition, the terrain is much steeper to the east of the AVA. To the north, within the established Lake Chelan AVA, glaciers eroded a deep and broad glacial trough that is now filled by Lake Chelan. South of the Rocky Reach, the valley of the Columbia River abruptly widens where the bedrock changes from hard, erosion-resistant metamorphic rocks to much softer sedimentary rocks.

=== Geology ===
According to the petition, 95 percent of the surface bedrock within the established Columbia Valley AVA consists of Cenozoic volcanic and sedimentary rock, predominantly Miocene Columbia River basalt, which is silica-poor and iron-rich. However, within the Rocky Reach AVA, erosion has removed the basalt and carved a deep valley into the underlying Mesozoic crystalline basement rocks. According to the petition, the region north of the AVA, specifically the established Lake Chelan AVA, is the only other region within the Columbia River AVA that has this crystalline basement bedrock. These rocks consist primarily of metamorphosed sedimentary and igneous rocks that are silica-rich and dominated by minerals like quartz and mica that are not found in the regions to the east, south, and west of the AVA, which has basalt bedrock. As a result, grapevine roots that reach the bedrock of the AVA come into contact with a chemical environment that is distinct from that associated with basalt bedrock.

=== Soil ===
The petition states that the soils of the AVA formed from wind-deposited sand and silt overlying cobblestone gravel, as well as from sand deposited by ice-age floods. The soils are typically clay-poor and well- to excessively well-drained. The thickness of the sand and silt is generally greater on the higher terraces within the proposed AVA, as their greater age has allowed more time for soils to be deposited. Most of the vineyards in the AVA are on the lower terraces, where the soils are very coarse-grained and consist largely of cobblestones deposited by glacial floods and outwash. According to the petition, the stony surfaces of the lower terraces warm quickly. The hot stones then radiate heat to the vines, promoting faster and more complete ripening. The coarse soils also more efficiently transmit water to deeper soil horizons, which encourages deeper root penetration than in silty or sandy soils. Finally, the petition notes that vineyards in stony soils do not require the use of cover crops since erosion is not an issue due to the coarse texture. To the north of the AVA, the soils of the glaciated valleys formed from glacial till, which is sediment deposited directly by melting glacial ice. The soils also contain volcanic ash and pumice, which are uncommon within Rocky Reach AVA. Fine-grained loess and sand over a basalt substratum dominate the soils in the regions to the south and east of Rocky Reach AVA.

=== Climate ===
Rocky Reach AVA's location at low elevations within the deep valley of the Columbia River allows it to have a warmer and longer growing season than the higher elevations of the surrounding mountains and plateaus. The petition included data on temperatures for the period of 2015–2017 measured at two locations within the proposed AVA and two locations in the region to the north of the proposed AVA. The data indicates that the Rocky Reach AVA generally has warmer average annual temperatures than the regions to the north and higher maximum temperatures. During the three-year period, the average temperature within the proposed Rocky Reach AVA was 64.7 °F (18.2 °C), with an average maximum temperature of 77.9 °F (25.5 °C). The highest maximum temperature measured during that period was 108.9 °F (42.7 °C). The average minimum temperature within the AVA was 52 °F (11 °C). The lowest minimum temperature was 29.2 °F (−1.6 °C). The average soil temperature was 68.8 °F (20.4 °C). By comparison, during the same three-year period, the average temperature within the region to the north of the AVA was 63 °F (17 °C), with an average maximum temperature of 74.9 °F (23.8 °C). The highest maximum temperature measured during that time period was 105.4 °F (40.8 °C). The average minimum temperature within the region to the north was the same as within the AVA, and the lowest minimum temperature was 29.9 °F (−1.2 °C), which was similar to the lowest minimum temperature within the AVA. The average soil temperature was 56.5 °F (13.6 °C). The USDA plant hardiness zones are 7a and 7b.

== Viticulture Industry ==
Rocky Pond Estate Winery planted the first vineyard in the Rocky Reach locale in 2013. The winery subsequently planted a second vineyard in 2018 and another in the neighboring Lake Chelan AVA. Currently, Rocky Pond is the only winery within the appellation. When the TTB recognized the Rocky Reach appellation in July 2022, there were seven commercial vineyards with approximately 117 acres (47 ha) under vine.
