= Ancient Lakes of Columbia Valley =

American Viticultural Area in Washington

Coordinates: 47°14′36″N 120°04′56″W

- Wine region
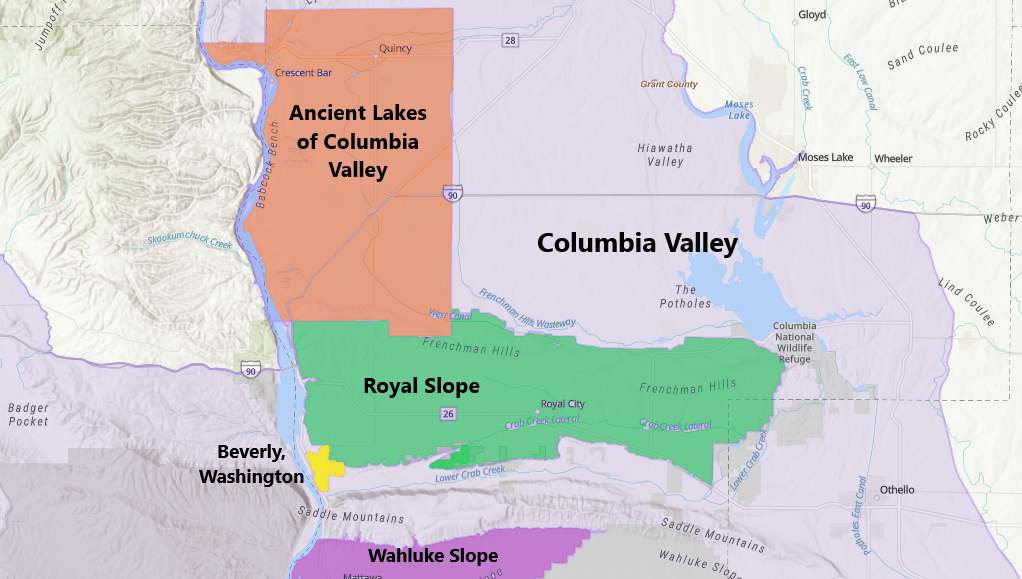
- Other names: Ancient Lakes
- Type: American Viticultural Area
- Year established: 2012
- Years of wine industry: 46
- Country: United States
- Part of: Washington, Columbia Valley AVA
- Other regions in Washington, Columbia Valley AVA: Beverly, Washington AVA, Candy Mountain AVA, Goose Gap AVA, Horse Heaven Hills AVA, Naches Heights AVA, Lake Chelan AVA, Rattlesnake Hills AVA, Red Mountain AVA, Rocky Reach AVA, Royal Slope AVA, Snipes Mountain AVA, The Burn of Columbia Valley AVA, Wahluke Slope AVA, Walla Walla Valley AVA, White Bluffs AVA, Yakima Valley AVA
- Growing season: 180 days
- Climate region: Region II
- Heat units: 2,570 GDD units
- Precipitation (annual average): 6.49 inches (165 mm)
- Soil conditions: Fine sand, very fine sandy loam, silt loam and loamy fine sand
- Total area: 162,762 acres (254 sq mi)
- Size of planted vineyards: 1,604 acres (649 ha)
- No. of vineyards: 6
- Grapes produced: Riesling, Pinot Gris, Chardonnay, Syrah, Merlot
- No. of wineries: 6

Ancient Lakes of Columbia Valley, also locally called Ancient Lakes, is an American Viticultural Area (AVA) located in the state of Washington on the western edge of the Columbia Basin, within the Quincy Basin landform encompassing portions of Douglas, Grant, and Kittitas Counties near the town of Quincy. It was established as the nation's 204^{th} and the state's thirteenth appellation on October 18, 2012 by the Alcohol and Tobacco Tax and Trade Bureau (TTB), Treasury after reviewing the petition submitted by Joan R. Davenport, a professor of soil sciences at Washington State University, and Cameron Fries of White Heron Cellars, on behalf of the vintners and grape growers in the Ancient Lakes region in central Washington, proposing the viticultural area within the vast Columbia Valley AVA named "Ancient Lakes of Columbia Valley."

The 162,762-acre (254 sq mi) appellation, at the outset, had six commercial vineyards that cultivated 1,604 acres (649 ha) mostly on the higher elevations on average of 1,200 to 1,500 feet (366–457 m), along the Beezley Hills and the Evergreen and Babcock ridges. White wine grapes represent the bulk of the grape plantings with White Riesling, Chardonnay, and Pinot Gris along with red varieties used for rosé-style wines. Red wine varieties are planted in close proximity to the Columbia River along the benches and exposed basalt cliffs formed by the "cataract effects" of the Missoula floods. The lower elevation is considerably warmer, lending itself to production of Syrah, Merlot and others.

== History ==
Grapes and winemaking have been in the Quincy area longer than people realize. Most people thought that grapes should not be grown north of I-90 but in the late 1970' s Dr. Vince Bryan began looking for a cooler spot to plant Pinot Noir. His search brought him to the Quincy Basin and in 1980 he and his wife Carol began planting what would become Champs de Brianne winery. now near the Gorge at George, Washington. These efforts showed the viability of grape growing in the Quincy area.
The Champs de Brianne Winery closed but the Bryan's continued cultivating vineyards. Over the years their focus moved away from Pinot Noir and they planted in warmer spots, growing Cabernet Sauvignon and Sémillon amongst other varieties. In 2000, the Bryan's opened a new winery and tasting room called Cave B Estate that is located in the midst of their vineyard along Silica Road.
In 1990, White Heron Cellars planted their vineyard above Crescent Bar. They grow Syrah, Roussanne, Malbec, and various other varieties that can be tasted at the winery in their vineyard above Crescent Bar. In 1996, Ryan Patrick Vineyards began planting their vineyards in several locations around the western half of the Quincy Basin. Their winery is currently located on Road S slightly southwest of Quincy. They are sharing this production facility with Saint Laurent Winery.
Local vineyardist Butch Milbrandt is currently the largest grower of wine grapes in the Quincy Basin. Milbrandt Farms has several hundred acres of grapes overlooking Evergreen Lake and a new vineyard planted in the spring of 2007 overlooking Ancient Lakes, whose grapes he sells to various wineries throughout the state. Jones of Washington is another grower that has grapes near Quincy. They have planted vines near Adams Road on the northeast side of the Basin and will soon rival Milbrandt Farms as the largest grower in the area. Their tasting room is on the western edge of Quincy on Highway 28.

== Terroir ==
=== Topography ===
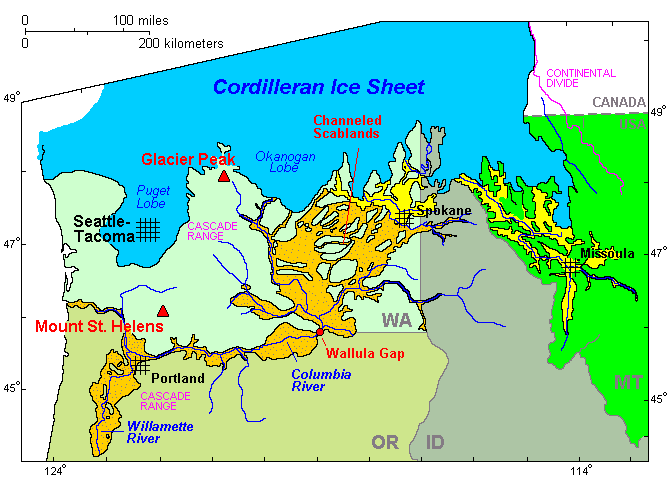
Missoula Floods

Like the Columbia Valley viticultural area, the Ancient Lakes of Columbia Valley viticultural area is also a basin, ringed by the steep slopes of the Beezley Hills, the Babcock Bench, and the Frenchman Hills. However, the Columbia Valley viticultural area is marked by three major rivers, whereas the water features of the Ancient Lakes of Columbia Valley viticultural area include many small lakes and two man-made irrigation canals; the only major river in the Ancient Lakes of Columbia Valley is the Columbia River, which forms the western portion of the boundary line. Additionally, the soil information provided in the petition for the Ancient Lakes of Columbia Valley viticultural area shows that although the soil types found within the boundary are present to some extent in the surrounding areas, they do not occur with the same frequency as within the viticultural area.
The same ice age Missoula floods that formed much of Central Washington shaped this entire valley. The region was severely impacted by the immense water flows that scoured and stripped the top soils down to the basalt and carved out canyons referred to locally as "coulees" which are prominent features near many of the planted vineyards. The viticultural area is located within a distinctive landform locally referred to as the Quincy Basin. The basin has elevations lower than the surrounding area and slopes gently to the east. As previously noted the foothills of the Beezley Mountains and the Frenchman Hills form the northern and southern portions of the boundary. The foothills of the Beezley Hills within the viticultural area start at around 1,300 feet (396 m) near the town of Quincy and rise to around 1,600 feet (488 m) at the northern portion of the boundary line. In the foothills of the Frenchman Hills, the elevations begin around at 1,200 feet (366 m) within the viticultural area and rise to 1,912 feet (583 m) at the peak marked Columbia on the USGS Vantage map, near the southern portion of the boundary line.
The floor of the basin comprises most of the viticultural area and is much flatter than most of the surrounding region. The Babcock Bench, Babcock Ridge, and the Potholes Coulee provide the only significant elevation changes and slope gradients within the basin. The Babcock Bench begins as a narrow band of nearly flat land within the viticultural area, with an elevation of 570 feet (174 m) at the edge of the river, and quickly rises to the east to form a steep and rugged terrain. At about the 1,100-foot (335 m) elevation, the slopes of the Babcock Bench become even steeper and higher, forming the Babcock Ridge, with elevations up to 1,586 feet (483 m). A map submitted with the petition shows slope gradients of 54 to 63 percent on the Babcock Ridge. The eastern slopes of Babcock Ridge are less steep than the western slopes, with slope gradients of approximately 27 percent, and descend to the lower elevations of the Quincy Basin floor. The highest elevation on the Potholes Coulee is a 1,528-foot (466 m) peak on the rim. The three lakes identified as Ancient Lake on the USGS map have an elevation of 821 feet (250 m) at water level, which is one of the lowest elevations in the coulee. The floor of the Quincy Basin has a nearly flat topography and slopes downward gently and gradually towards the east from the Potholes Coulee and Babcock Ridge, with a sloping gradient of less than 4 percent. To the north of the viticultural area, the slope gradient is much steeper and the elevations are much higher. The Beezley Hills rise from the foothills to an elevation of 2,882 feet (878 m) at Monument Hill. Slope gradients in the hills range from 27 to 54 percent, much steeper than the floor of the Quincy Basin within the viticultural area. To the east of the viticultural area, the topography is nearly flat, similar to the floor of the Quincy Basin within the viticultural area. However, the slight elevations of the region to the east of the viticultural area have mostly western-facing slopes, in contrast to the mostly eastern-facing slopes of the basin floor within the viticultural area. The terrain east of the viticultural area also develops an upward slope with a gradient of approximately 11 percent. The change in slope and the increase in gradient mark the eastern edge of the Quincy Basin. To the south of the viticultural area are the Frenchman Hills, which form the southern edge of the Quincy Basin. Outside of the viticultural area, the elevations of the Frenchman Hills begin to descend from a height of around 1,740 feet (530 m), transitioning into the feature known as the Royal Slope. The Royal Slope descends to approximately 1,000 feet (305 m) and has slope gradients ranging from 4 to 11 percent. To the west of the Babcock Bench and Columbia River, beyond the boundary of the viticultural area, the terrain is rugged and steep, with slope gradients of between 27 to 54 percent. Elevations in this region start at 580 feet (177 m) along the banks of the Columbia River and quickly rise to 2,765 feet (843 m) at a peak on the West Bar map. The growing region lies close to the easternmost foothills of the Cascade Mountain range. A strong rain shadow effect gives the area one of the lowest precipitation rates in the Columbia Valley.
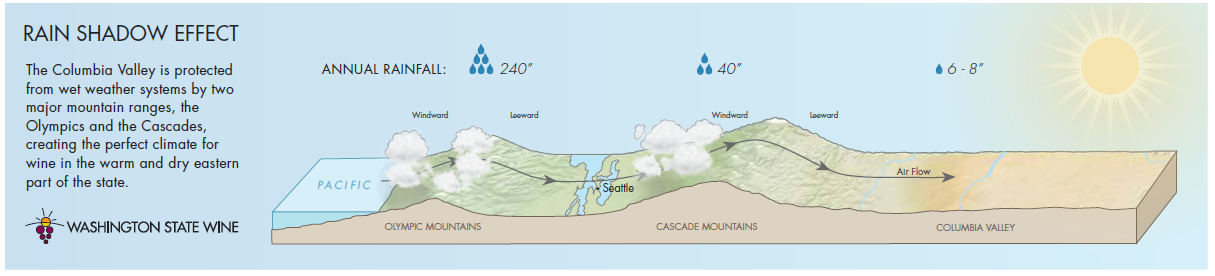

=== Climate ===
The smaller Ancient Lakes of Columbia Valley viticultural area generally has a climate that fits within the climate range of the larger Columbia Valley viticultural area with low annual precipitation, a growing season of 180 days, and 2,570 GDD units. However, TTB notes that the relatively uniform distinguishing features of the smaller Ancient Lakes of Columbia Valley viticultural area contrast to the more varied topography, soils, and climate of the expansive Columbia Valley viticultural area. The petition provides climatic data for the Ancient Lakes of Columbia Valley viticultural area and the surrounding areas, including annual precipitation averages in inches, growing degree day (GDD) units, and the number of consecutive days during which GDD accumulation was not interrupted by a day when the temperature did not exceed 50 °F (10 °C). A base temperature of 50 °F (10 °C) is used because that is the base temperature used for calculating growing degree days. TTB notes that a continuous span of GDD unit accumulation contributes to consistent grape growth and achieving maturity before the onset of freezing temperatures. The area to the north of the viticultural area has more precipitation, more GDD units, and more continuous GDD unit days. The area to the east is cooler, as shown by fewer GDD units and a shorter period of GDD unit days. The area to the south has a greater fluctuation in growing season temperatures than the viticultural area; although daytime temperatures climb high enough above 50 °F (10 °C) to achieve a high total number of GDD units, temperatures also drop below 50 °F (10 °C) frequently enough to result in a shorter number of continuous GDD unit days. The area to the west receives more precipitation than the smaller viticultural area and is cooler, with fewer GDD units and a shorter period of continuous GDD unit days. The USDA plant hardiness zone ranges from 6b to 7b.

=== Soils ===
Basalt and caliche rock are unique in their prominence of the soils in the grape growing areas. Missoula floods scoured the area stripping the original top soils along the western edge of the Quincy valley. Large standing pools of water left by the floods created thick deposits of caliche that lay over the basalt. With time, both rock types have fractured and are prominent in the soils. Quincy loam and windblown loess soils lay over the rocks. The Ancient Lakes of Columbia Valley viticultural area contains 65 soil types (United States Department of Agriculture-Natural Resources Conservation Service (USDA–NCRS), with the most common 17 soils within the viticultural area covering 88 percent of the land surface. The Ancient Lakes region soils are classified as Aridisols, which were formed in arid conditions and have a low presence of organic matter. Soils with low levels of organic matter are important in viticulture because they release less nitrogen, resulting in less vigorous vine growth and a more favorable fruit-to-canopy ratio. The petition includes two tables that describe the soil composition of the Ancient Lakes of Columbia Valley viticultural area and the areas due north, east, south, and west. The first table lists the seven most common soil series in the viticultural area and the percentage (and rank) of the series in areas due north, east, south, and west. The second table lists the top five soil series in the areas surrounding the viticultural area. The tables show significant contrasts in soils within and outside of the Ancient Lakes of Columbia Valley viticultural area. To the north of the Ancient Lakes of Columbia Valley viticultural area, the five most common northern soils are all Mollisols, which have high levels of organic matter that can contribute to more vigorous vine growth than the Aridisoils of the viticultural area. The most common northern soil series shows influence from volcanic activity. Volcanic soils tend to have water repellent characteristics and provide irrigation challenges.
To the east, Quincy fine sand and Taunton loamy fine sand are two of the five most common soils, similar to the Ancient Lakes of Columbia Valley viticultural area. However, there are fewer soil types to the east than within the viticultural area, and a higher percentage of the soils to the east are sandy soils. Soils high in sand have lower water holding capacities than less sandy soils. To the south, all of the seven most common soils in the Ancient Lakes region are present; however, these soils account for only 24.72 percent of the soil composition. Schawana complex soils, which are not present within the viticultural area, are the most dominant in the area to the south of the viticultural area, comprising 15.43 percent of the soils. Schawana complex soils are described as very weakly developed soils with very shallow depths that are not particularly well suited for viticulture. The region to the west contains none of the seven most common soils found within the viticultural area. Two of the most common soils to the west are of volcanic origin, as indicated by the presence of ash. These soils, like the volcanic soils to the north of the viticultural area, have low water holding capacities. The most common soils to the west also contain large quantities of stones and cobbles, which also have low water holding capacity.

== Vineyards ==
- Cave B- Familigia Vineyards
- Jones of Washington
- Evergreen Vineyards
- Ryan Patrick Vineyards
- Spanish Castle Vineyards
- White Heron Cellars
