= Wahluke Slope AVA =

American Viticultural Area in Washington

Coordinates: 46°45′50″N 119°55′52″W

Wahluke Slope
- Wine region
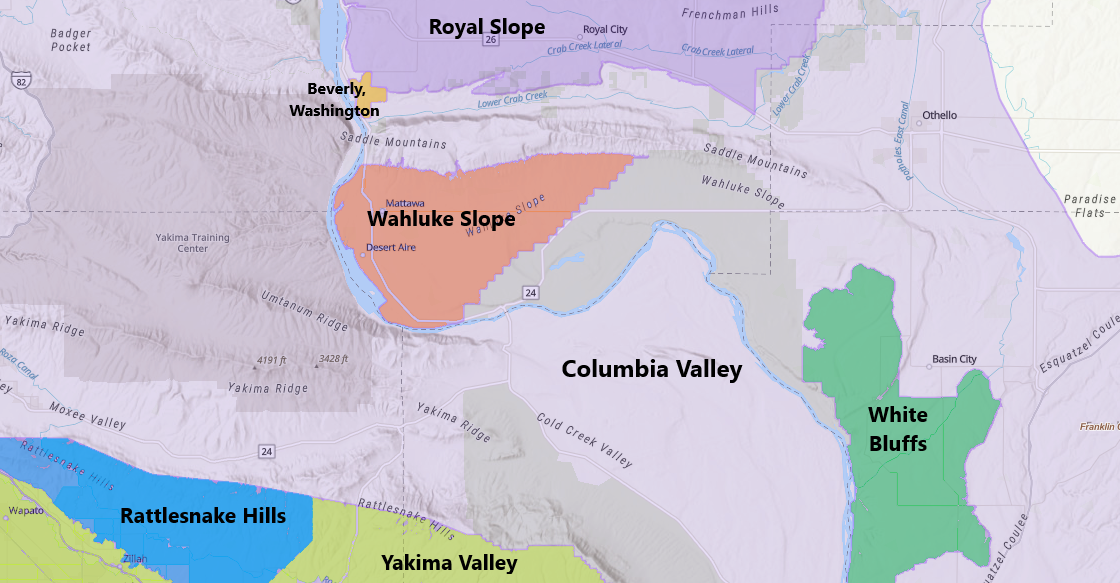
- Type: American Viticultural Area
- Year established: 2005
- Country: United States
- Part of: Washington, Columbia Valley AVA
- Other regions in Washington, Columbia Valley AVA: Ancient Lakes of Columbia Valley AVA, Beverly, Washington AVA, Candy Mountain AVA, Goose Gap AVA, Horse Heaven Hills AVA, Lake Chelan AVA, Naches Heights AVA, Rattlesnake Hills AVA, Red Mountain AVA, Rocky Reach AVA, Royal Slope AVA, Snipes Mountain AVA, The Burn of Columbia Valley AVA, The Rocks District of Milton-Freewater AVA, Walla Walla Valley AVA, White Bluffs AVA, Yakima Valley AVA
- Growing season: 212 days
- Climate region: Region III
- Heat units: 3,013 GDD units
- Precipitation (annual average): 5.9 inches (149.9 mm)
- Soil conditions: Formed predominantly from deep wind-blown sand or silty loess averaging greater than 60-inch deep (1,524 mm) formed from sediments og giant glacial floods
- Total area: 81,000 acres (127 sq mi)
- Size of planted vineyards: 8,932 acres (3,615 ha)
- No. of vineyards: 20
- Grapes produced: Barbera, Cabernet Franc, Cabernet Sauvignon, Chardonnay, Gewurztraminer, Grenache, Merlot, Mourvedre, Petit Verdot, Sangiovese, Sauvignon blanc, Syrah, Viognier, Zinfandel
- No. of wineries: 5
- Wine produced: Varietal, Dessert wine, Sparkling wine, Meritage

Wahluke Slope is an American Viticultural Area (AVA) located on the Wahluke Slope landform within Grant County, Washington and centered around the small town of Mattawa. It extends from the Columbia River in the west, the Hanford Site boundary in the southwest, the north bank of the Columbia River on the south, up to the Wahluke Slope Wildlife Refuge in the east, and along the 1,480-foot (450 m) elevation of the Saddle Mountains on the north.
The wine region was established as the nation's 170th and the state's eighth appellation on December 7, 2005 by the Alcohol and Tobacco Tax and Trade Bureau (TTB), Treasury after reviewing the petition submitted by the Wahluke Slope Wine Grape Growers Association represented by Alan J. Busacca, Ph.D., proposing the viticultural area named "Wahluke Slope."

"Wahluke" (wˈɑːluːk WAH-luke) is a Native American word for "watering place." The AVA is approximately 145 miles (233 km) southeast of Seattle immediately north of the Hanford Reservation of the United States Department of Energy (USDOE). The 80,490-acre (126 sq mi) area became the fifth sub-appellation within the vast Columbia Valley AVA cultivating approximately 8,931 acres (3,614 ha) which is nearly 15 percent of the state's total winegrape acreage. At the outset, it was residence to more than 20 vineyards and at least three wine production facilities. The region cultivates Merlot, Syrah, Cabernet Sauvignon, Riesling, Chardonnay and Chenin Blanc, but is primarily known for its Merlot and Cabernet Sauvignon. The area is largely within the Mattawa, Washington 99349 area code.

== Terroir ==
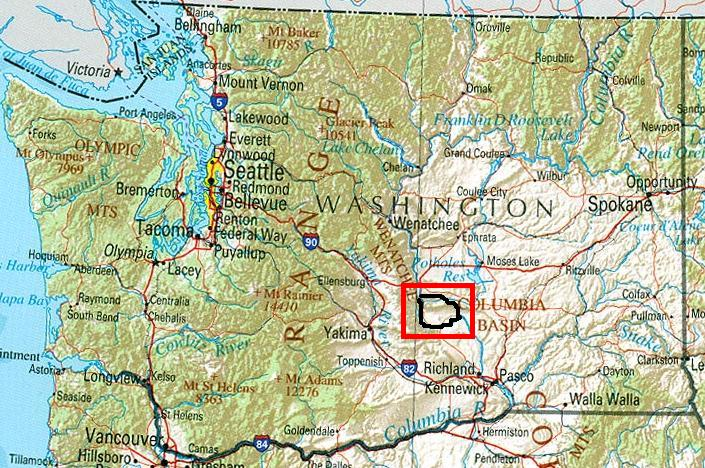

=== Topography ===
The Wahluke Slope region is situated on the Columbia Plateau in eastern Washington, which is bordered by the Rocky Mountains on the north and east, the Blue Mountains to the south, and the Cascade Mountains to the west. The Wahluke Slope viticultural area sits on the south-facing alluvial benchlands of the Saddle Mountains. Its elevation varies from 425 feet (130 m) along the Columbia River to 1,480 feet (451 m) on the south slope of the Saddle Mountains. Most of the area's vineyards are between 425 and 1,000 feet (130–305 m) in elevation. The Wahluke Slope viticultural area is geographically isolated from other wine production areas in the State of Washington. Wahluke Slope is bounded by the bedrock ridge of the Saddle Mountains, the Columbia River, and government-owned lands, providing isolation and a separate viticultural identity. The Wahluke viticultural area sits on a mega [[alluvial fan]], a single landform geographical area, extending 15 miles (24 km) in length. Other viticultural areas in Washington State have more diverse and complex landforms, with the possible exception of the much smaller Red Mountain viticultural area. The south-facing Wahluke Slope landform has relatively flat agricultural sites that allow for viticultural uniformity in plant vigor and ripening. The mega fan eventually drops away several hundred feet on three sides, providing good air drainage that minimizes spring and fall freezes in the area.

=== Climate ===
The State of Washington's Public Agricultural Weather System (PAWS) Web site provides the statistics used in the Wahluke Slope viticultural area petition. Climatic information for the petition generally spans 10 years—1994 through 2003—as available. Precipitation in the Wahluke Slope viticultural area averages 5.9 inches (150 mm) annually, making it the driest area in that region of eastern Washington, according to PAWS. Also, the area has the lowest harvest rainfall average for the weather stations compared. The viticultural advantages include control of vine vigor and ripening through irrigation during the growing season and low potential for harmful rainfall at harvest. Pan evapotranspiration (Etp) in the Wahluke Slope area ranks first among the nine PAWS stations cited. Photosynthesis and transpiration, which are key factors in grape production, are the highest in the Wahluke Slope area as compared to other selected stations in Washington. Wahluke Slope averages 3,013 degree-days (GDD) of heat accumulation annually. Each degree that a day's mean temperature is above 50 degrees Fahrenheit, which is the minimum temperature required for grapevine growth, is counted as one degree-day. In addition, the Wahluke Slope region ranks third highest in mean maximum temperature, mean annual temperature, and solar radiation, according to PAWS data. These temperatures confirm Wahluke Slope as a grape-growing hot spot within Washington State. Finally, Wahluke Slope is the third windiest site evaluated, which affects grape plant growth, causing shorter shoot length, smaller leaf size, and fewer and smaller grape clusters. The highest temperature ever measured in Washington state, as of 2021, was recorded at Wahluke on July 24, 1928, at 118 °F (47.8 °C). This record was later tied at Ice Harbor Dam in 1961. The temperature was eventually surpassed on June 29, 2021, when Hanford reached 120 °F (48.9 °C). The USDA plant hardiness zones are 7a and 7b.

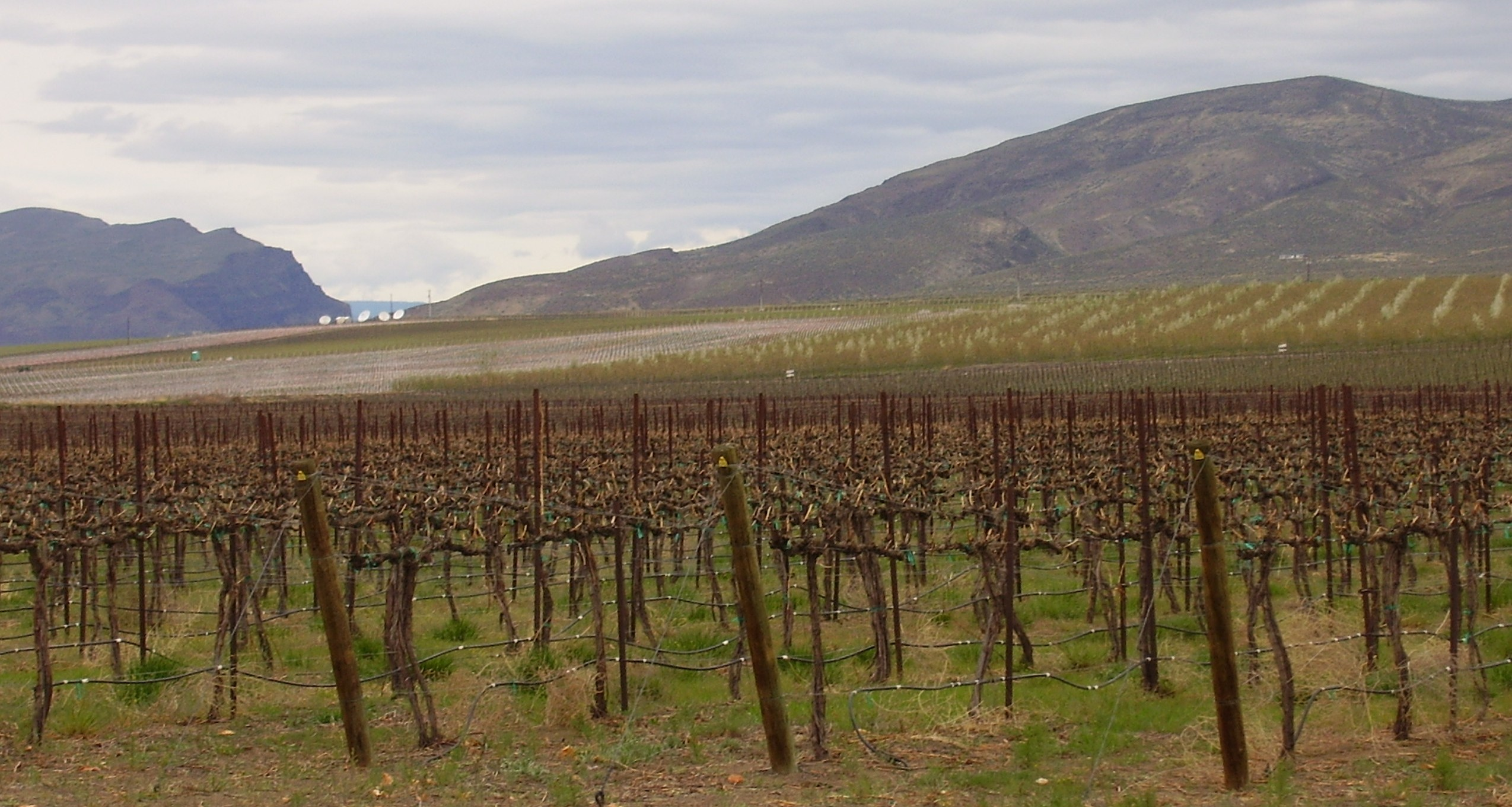
Wahluke Slope Vineyards below the Sentinel Gap and Saddle Mountains in late winter.

=== Soils ===
Ice-age events played an important role in the formation of soils in the viticultural area. When the Lake Missoula glacial ice dam repeatedly failed, large water floods flowed across eastern Washington depositing gravel bars and fine-grained sandy and silty sediments. Winds reworked the glacial sediments to form dunes of sand and loess (the silty sediment accumulated from the fallout of dust). These sediments range in thickness from a few inches to many feet deep. Soils of the Wahluke Slope viticultural area have formed predominantly from deep wind-blown sand, averaging greater than 60 inches (1,524 mm) in depth. To a lesser extent, some soils have formed from the wind-blown sand or silty loess sediments of the giant glacial floods. Wahluke Slope soils are distinctive by their uniformity over large areas. The Quincy-Burbank-Hezel soil series, which covers more than half the viticultural area, encompasses a contiguous area of several square miles as documented in the Soil Survey of Grant County, Washington, on map sheets 163, 164, and 169. This uniformity contrasts with the soil variability of some nearby regions, including the Red Mountain viticultural area and the Canoe Ridge area of the Horse Heaven Hills region. Other soils series within the boundaries documented in the Soil Survey of Grant County include the Sagemoor-Kennewick-Warden, the Taunton-Timmerman-Quincy, and the Scoon-Taunton-Finley series, as well as several others with small acreages. Wahluke Slope soils are unique with their smooth landform shape, shallow slope angle that averages less than 8 percent, and predominant south-facing orientation at the top of the mega alluvial fan. This smooth landform results in consistent climate variability across the proposed viticultural area.

== See also ==
- Washington wine
