= Royal Slope AVA =

Viticultural area in Washington, USA

Coordinates: 46°57′57″N 119°20′02″W

Royal Slope
- Wine region
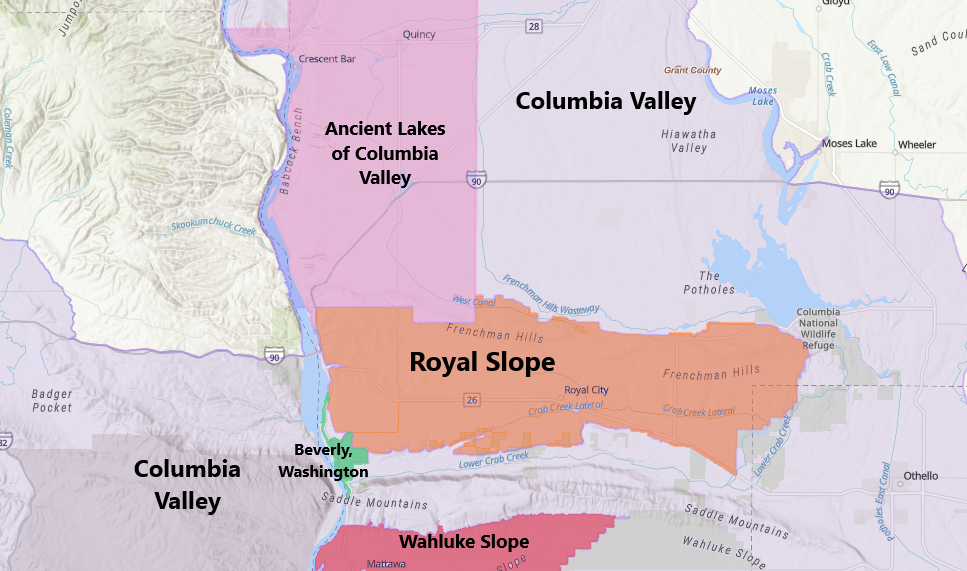
- Type: American Viticultural Area
- Year established: 2020
- Years of wine industry: 43
- Country: United States
- Part of: Washington, Columbia Valley AVA
- Other regions in Washington, Columbia Valley AVA: Ancient Lakes of Columbia Valley AVA, Beverly, Washington AVA, Candy Mountain AVA, Goose Gap AVA, Horse Heaven Hills AVA, Naches Heights AVA. Lake Chelan AVA, Rattlesnake Hills AVA, Red Mountain AVA, Rocky Reach AVA, Snipes Mountain AVA, The Burn of Columbia Valley AVA, Wahluke Slope AVA, Walla Walla Valley AVA, White Bluffs AVA, Yakima Valley AVA
- Growing season: 158 days
- Climate region: Region III
- Heat units: 3,059 GDD units
- Precipitation (annual average): 8 to 10 inches (203–254 mm)
- Soil conditions: Surface loess, sand, and flood-deposited silt
- Total area: 156,389 acres (244 sq mi)
- Size of planted vineyards: 1,900 acres (769 ha)
- No. of vineyards: 13
- Grapes produced: Cabernet Franc, Chardonnay, Merlot, Riesling, Syrah
- No. of wineries: 1

Royal Slope is an American Viticultural Area (AVA) located within the Columbia Valley landform across Adams and Grant Counties in central Washington state. It was established as the nation's 250^{th}, the state's fifteenth and Columbia Valley's twelfth appellation on September 2, 2020 by the Alcohol and Tobacco Tax and Trade Bureau (TTB), Treasury after reviewing the petition submitted by Alan Busacca, licensed geologist and founder of Vinitas Vineyard Consultants, LLC, on behalf of the Royal Slope Wine Grower's Association, proposing the viticultural area named "Royal Slope."."
The AVA lies between the Quincy Basin and Saddle Mountains surrounding the town of Royal City encompassing 156,389 acres (244 sq mi) entirely within the vast Columbia Valley AVA. There are currently 13 producing commercial vineyards cultivating approximately 1,900 acres (769 ha) with only one winery. According to the petition, the distinguishing features of the Royal Slope AVA are its climate, topography, geology, and soils.

== History ==
According to local lore, the name originated when two Scotsmen climbed the Saddle Mountains in the 1880s and observed the view to the north of the south-sloped topography and exclaimed, "Now that's a Royal Slope!" Historically, the name "Royal Slope" is printed on USGS topographic maps of various scales since the 1950s to mark the general area. The name has been in common usage for more than 50 years to describe the rich agricultural district of tree fruit orchards, row and field crops and since the 1980s, viticulture.

== Terroir ==
=== Topography ===
The topography of Royal Slope is characterized by the gentle, south-facing slopes of an east–west trending 30 miles (48 km) range of hills called the Frenchman Hills. Slope angles are generally less than 15 percent, with very few slopes having angles of less than 3 percent. The slopes are gentle enough for agricultural purposes and are not as freeze-prone as flatter terrains such as valley floors. To the north of the AVA, the Frenchman Hills fall away to the Quincy Basin, which is a large, flat-floored valley. To the northeast are sand dunes and "pothole" ponds between the dune crests. To the east and south of the AVA is the Crab Creek Coulee gouged out by Missoula Floods, and on the west, the bedrock cliffs fall away steeply to the Columbia River, which has lower elevations and steeper, rockier terrain than the AVA. About 90% of Royal Slope's area consists of gently to somewhat steeply south-facing slopes. These southern slopes represent the best aspect for wine grapes in the Pacific Northwest due to the northerly latitude.

=== Climate ===
The climate of Royal Slope is described as warm but not excessively hot, making it a suitable climate for growing a variety of red and white grape varietals, including Cabernet Franc, Merlot, Syrah, Chardonnay, and Riesling. The AVA generally has greater growing degree day (In the Winkler climate classification system, annual heat accumulation during the growing season, measured in annual growing degree days (GDDs), defines climatic regions. One GDD accumulates for each degree Fahrenheit that a day's mean temperature is above 50 °F (10 °C), the minimum temperature required for grapevine growth.) accumulations and an average cool-climate viticulture sustainability index (The cool-climate viticulture sustainability index represents the number of days between the last temperature below 29 °F (−2 °C) in the spring and the first temperature below 29 °F (−2 °C) in the fall) number than all of the surrounding regions except the regions to the south and north. The AVA also has a lower risk of vine-damaging freezes, as it generally has fewer days per year with temperatures below 32 °F (0 °C) than all of the surrounding regions except the region to the south. Finally, the AVA has an average of only 9 days a year with temperatures above 95 °F (35 °C), which is fewer than the region to the south, and has fewer very hot days per year than the regions to the north, east, and west. Grape vines shut down photosynthesis at temperatures above 95 °F (35 °C), which can slow or even stop the synthesis of sugars and other ripening factors and may delay harvest. The USDA plant hardiness zones are 6a to 7b.

=== Soil ===
Royal Slope, like the rest of the Columbia Valley, is underlain with Miocene-era basaltic bedrock and has been affected by Ice Age megafloods. Within the region of the AVA, the floodwaters followed flood channels to the east and northeast. The waters entered the region in a relatively smooth fashion and the AVA remained largely above the floodwaters. As a result, the AVA was not heavily eroded and remained a landscape of gentle hills with deep soils suitable for cultivation. By contrast, the regions to the east and south of the AVA were eroded by fast-moving floodwaters which cut deeply into the landscape and formed the scablands of Crab Creek Coulee. Similarly strong floodwaters flowed through the region to the west of the AVA, creating the steep canyon of the Columbia River. North of the AVA, the floodwaters were smoother and gentler and deposited vast amounts of sand in what is now the Quincy Basin, creating a landscape of dunes and "pothole" lakes. Within the AVA, the soils are a combination of sediments from glacial floods and wind-blown post-glacial sand and silt (loess). The soils are generally deep enough for vines to extend their roots far into the soil before encountering bedrock or other impediments. The predominant soils are Aridosols, which are characterized as well-drained and low in organic material. Major soil series include Warden, Sagemoore, Adkins, and Kennewick, which together comprise approximately 59 percent of the soil in the AVA. By contrast, the regions to the east, west, and immediate south of the AVA are scablands, which have very little, if any, topsoil. Farther south of the AVA, within the established Wahluke Slope AVA, the soils are deep and fertile but are primarily Entisols, including the Quincy soil series, which comprise less than two percent of the soils in the AVA. The region to the north of the AVA is also primarily composed of Entisols, including the Quincy soil series.

== Viticulture Industry ==
Royal Slope AVA has the potential, situated between Wenatchee and Tri Cities and about two and half hours from Seattle, to become a popular destination within the state's growing enotourism industry. The region gained industry recognition when a Charles Smith 2006 Royal City Syrah was rated 100 points by Wine Enthusiast as the first vintage in the state to rank that high.
