= White Bluffs AVA =

American viticultural area in Washington

Coordinates: 46°23′36″N 119°14′29″W

White Bluffs
- Wine region
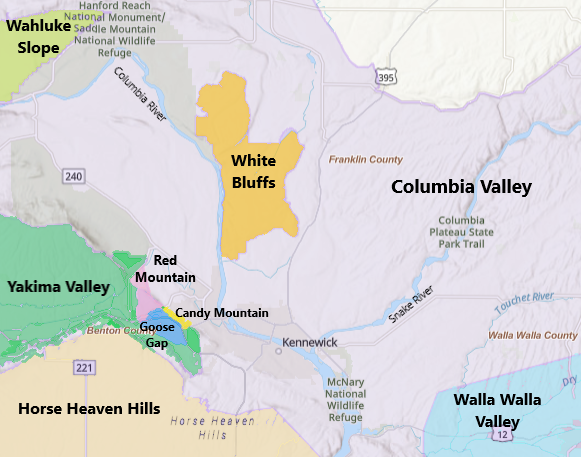
- Type: American Viticultural Area
- Year established: 2021
- Years of wine industry: 54
- Country: United States
- Part of: Washington, Columbia Valley AVA
- Other regions in Washington, Columbia Valley AVA: Ancient Lakes of Columbia Valley AVA, Beverly, Washington AVA, Horse Heaven Hills AVA, Naches Heights AVA. Lake Chelan AVA, The Burn of Columbia Valley AVA, Rocky Reach AVA, Royal Slope AVA, Walla Walla Valley AVA, Wahluke Slope, Yakima Valley AVA
- Growing season: 229-246 days
- Climate region: Region III
- Heat units: 3,231 GDD units
- Precipitation (annual average): 6 inches (152 mm)
- Soil conditions: Surface loess, sand, and flood-deposited silt
- Total area: 93,738 acres (146 sq mi)
- Size of planted vineyards: 1,127 acres (456 ha)
- No. of vineyards: 9
- Grapes produced: Cabernet Sauvignon, Merlot, Riesling, Sauvignon Blanc, Syrah
- No. of wineries: 1

White Bluffs is an American Viticultural Area (AVA) located about 10 miles (16 km) north of Tri-Cities on the plateaus overlooking the Columbia River in Franklin County, Washington. The area lies entirely within the vast Columbia Valley appellation. It was established as the nation's 254^{th}, the state's nineteenth and Columbia Valley's fifteenth AVA on June 17, 2021 by the Alcohol and Tobacco Tax and Trade Bureau (TTB), Treasury after reviewing the petition submitted by Whitman College professor and geologist, Dr. Kevin Pogue, on behalf of local winemakers and vineyard owners, proposing the viticultural area named "White Bluffs."
The 93,738-acre (146 sq mi) appellation, at the outset, had nine commercial vineyards cultivating approximately 1,127 acres (456 ha) and a single winery. The distinguishing features of White Bluffs are its topography, geology, soils, and climate.

== History ==
White Bluff gets its name from the whiteish sedimentary layers that appear on the cliffs above the Columbia River. Named the Ringold Formation, the layer is ancient lakebed sediment covered with windblown silt and Missoula Flood deposits. According to TTB regulations, AVA names are required to reflect the area's history or geology. Agriculture fields were established on the elevated plateaus by 19th century settlers atop the distinctive white bluffs in Franklin County overlooking the Columbia River. "White Bluffs" was the name of the farm community across the river in Benton County that, in 1943, was seized, razed, and leveled by the federal government to construct the Manhattan Project's Hanford Engineer Works. Formerly, wine and juice grapes were grown as the area's agriculture. After the repeal of Prohibition, there were few wineries and vineyards in Washington. By the 1960s, some vineyards were concentrated in the Yakima Valley and a smattering were scattered across the state. In 1968, a group of investors led by Seattle attorney Alec Bayless purchased land overlooking the Columbia River north of Pasco. Four years later, the Texas native and his business group planted vines establishing Sagemoor Vineyards in the White Bluffs area.

== Terroir ==
=== Topography and Geology ===
'White Bluffs AVA is located on a broad elevated plateau that rises, on average, 200 feet (61 m) above the surrounding landscape. The Ringold and Koontz Coulees divide the plateau into two distinct areas capped by flat regions with relatively even surfaces and south-facing slope aspects. Elevations within the area range from 700 feet (213 m) in the coulees to approximately 1,200 feet (366 m) in the northeastern section of the AVA. The majority of the AVA has elevations between 800 to 1,000 feet (244–305 m). By contrast, the regions surrounding the AVA are on the Columbia Valley floor and lower elevations. According to the petition, the relatively flat terrain of the AVA provides gently sloping vineyard sites. Southern aspects allow vines to absorb more solar energy per unit area than regions without a southern aspect. Greater solar energy absorption promotes an earlier onset of bud break, flowering, veraison, and harvest. The petition also states that vineyards planted on the plateau have a longer growing season than vineyards on the valley floor, where cold air pools and increases the risk of frost.

=== Soil ===
Beneath White Bluffs AVA is a thick layer of sedimentary rocks called the Ringold Formation, which was formed in lakes and rivers between 8.5 and 3.4 million years ago. The Ringold Formation overlies the Columbia River basalt bedrock. The upper part of the Ringold Formation contains an erosion-resistant layer commonly referred to as caliche. This layer reaches depths of at least 15 feet (5 m) and limits root penetration and the water-holding capabilities of the soil. As a result, areas with thick layers of caliche must undergo ripping with bulldozers to break up the caliche before planting vineyards. By contrast, the Ringold Formation and the caliche layer are much thinner or entirely absent in the regions surrounding White Bluffs AVA, allowing roots to come into contact with the basalt bedrock and a variety of minerals including olivine and plagioclase feldspar. The soils of the AVA derive from wind-deposited silt and fine sand overlying sediment deposited by ice-age floods. Most of the flood sediment is a mixture of silt and sand that settled out of suspension in glacial Lake Lewis. The thickness of the flood sediment gradually increases with decreasing elevation since there were multiple ice-age floods of varying intensity, and the lower elevations were flooded more frequently. As a result, the soil depths on the plateau that comprises the AVA are likely to be thinner than those of the surrounding valley floor. The thinness of the soils in White Bluffs AVA allows roots to reach the clay-rich Ringold Formation. High clay content allows the soils to release water more slowly than sandier soils, putting less stress on grapevines during dry conditions.

=== Climate ===
The petition states that White Bluffs AVA has a longer growing season than the surrounding regions. According to the petition, the longer growing season means that the AVA is less prone to spring frosts that can damage the vines after bud break and are also less likely to experience fall frosts that halt the ripening process and delay harvest. The growing season within the AVA averages 237.5 days, while the region to the north averages 200 days. The region to the east averages 169 days, and the region to the south averages 191 days. Climate data was unavailable for the area west of the appellation. The plant hardiness zones are 7a to 7b.

== Viticulture industry ==
"White Bluffs is defined by great old vineyards that have a stellar reputation for producing fine wines," said Kevin Pogue PhD, petitioner for White Bluffs. "With ample irrigation from the Columbia Basin Project, there's plenty of room for expansion." There are 1,127 acres (456 ha) of wine grapes currently planted between nine commercial vineyards, with many notable varieties, including Cabernet Sauvignon, Merlot, Syrah, Riesling and Sauvignon Blanc. Nearly one in every ten Washington wineries source fruit from the White Bluffs region. "Ninety-two wineries currently purchase fruit from our vineyards alone," said Kent Waliser, director of wine and grape sales for Sagemoor Vineyards, which is a collection of four vineyards within the AVA. "A number of the vineyards have been around for over 40 years, so they've really stood the test of time. This is a place that's been known forever, but not named until now. It's about time that we can identify it as a place."
