= Kikori whiskey =

American-Japanese alcoholic beverage fusion

Kikori Whiskey is a Japanese-style whiskey distilled by Korean-American entrepreneur Ann Soh Woods. Launched in 2015, Kikori is a rice based whiskey aged three years. Based in Los Angeles, Kikori is distilled in Japan. Since whiskey is not typically distilled from rice, the Alcohol and Tobacco Tax and Trade Bureau has had difficulty properly classifying the liquor.
