= Title 27 of the Code of Federal Regulations =

U.S. federal rules and regulations on alcohol, tobacco products, and firearms

CFR Title 27 – Alcohol, Tobacco Products and Firearms is one of 50 titles composing the United States Code of Federal Regulations (CFR) and contains the principal set of rules and regulations issued by federal agencies regarding alcohol, tobacco products, and firearms. It is available in digital and printed form and can be referenced online using the Electronic Code of Federal Regulations (e-CFR).

== Structure ==
The table of contents, as reflected in the e-CFR updated February 21, 2014, is as follows:

Volume	Chapter	Parts	Regulatory Entity
1	I	1–39	Alcohol and Tobacco Tax and Trade Bureau, Department of the Treasury
2		40–399	Alcohol and Tobacco Tax and Trade Bureau, Department of the Treasury
3	II	400–699	Bureau of Alcohol, Tobacco, Firearms, and Explosives, Department of Justice
