= Columbia Valley AVA =

American Viticultural Area in Washington and Oregon

Coordinates: 46°21′20″N 119°54′24″W

Columbia Valley
- Wine region
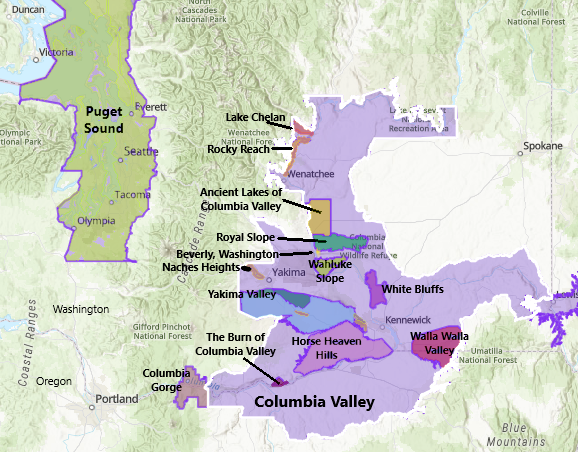
- Type: American Viticultural Area
- Year established: 1984
- Years of wine industry: 155
- Country: United States
- Part of: Oregon, Washington
- Sub-regions: Ancient Lakes of Columbia Valley AVA, Beverly, Washington AVA, Candy Mountain AVA, Columbia Hills AVA, Goose Gap AVA, Horse Heaven Hills AVA, Lake Chelan AVA, Naches Heights AVA, Rattlesnake Hills AVA, Red Mountain AVA, Rocky Reach AVA, Royal Slope AVA, Snipes Mountain AVA, The Burn of Columbia Valley AVA, The Rocks District of Milton-Freewater AVA, Wahluke Slope AVA, Walla Walla Valley AVA, White Bluffs AVA, Yakima Valley AVA
- Growing season: 180–200 days
- Climate region: Region II-III
- Heat units: 2,000–3,000 GDD units
- Precipitation (annual average): 6–8 inches (152–203 mm)
- Soil conditions: Sand & silt loess over gravel-slackwater sediment with basaltic bedrock
- Total area: 11.52 million acres (18,000 sq mi)
- Size of planted vineyards: Total: 60,079 acres (24,313 ha); Washington: 59,234 acres (23,971 ha)
- Grapes produced: Chardonnay, Chenin Blanc, Gewurztraminer, Muscat Canelli, Muscat Ottonel, Orange Muscat, Pinot Gris / Grigio, Riesling, Roussanne, Sauvignon Blanc, Semillon, Siegerrebe, Viognier, Barbera, Black Muscat, Cabernet Franc, Cabernet Sauvignon, Gamay Beaujolais, Grenache, Malbec, Merlot, Mourvedre / Mataro, Nebbiolo, Petit Verdot, Petite Sirah, Pinot Noir, Riesling, Sangiovese, Syrah / Shiraz, Tempranillo / Valdepenas, Zinfandel, Lemberger
- No. of wineries: 244
- Wine produced: Varietal, Dessert / Late Harvest, Meritage and Sparkling wine
- Comments: Map depicts Columbia Valley AVA in Washington omitting area in northern Oregon south of the Columbia River.

Columbia Valley is an American Viticultural Area (AVA) located within the Columbia River Plateau landform encompassing much of central and southern Washington and crossing the state boundary into northern Oregon south of the Columbia River. The viticultural area includes the drainage basin of the Columbia River and its tributaries through much of Washington. It was established as the nation's 72^{nd}, Washington's third and Oregon's fourth appellation on December 13, 1984 by the Bureau of Alcohol, Tobacco and Firearms (ATF), Treasury after reviewing the petition submitted by Drs, Walter Clore and Wade Wolfe of Prosser, Washington on behalf of Washington's oldest and largest winery, Chateau Ste. Michelle, and by William Blosser of the Sokol Blosser Winery, Dundee, Oregon, proposing the viticultural area named "Columbia Valley." Allen Shoup, president of Chateau Ste. Michelle, understood the importance of obtaining AVA status to grow the reputation of the Northwest viticulture industry

Columbia Valley's geography covers approximately 14.72 million acres (23,000 sq mi) extending 185 miles (298 km) from the east to west and 200 miles (322 km) from north to south. ATF included the entire valley within the viticultural area except the portion between Banks Lake and the Snake River. Therefore, the Columbia Valley appellation encompasses 11.52 million acres (18,000 sq mi).

Columbia Valley viticultural area is the largest wine region in Washington containing about 99% of the state's viticulture acreage of over 59,000 acres (23,876 ha) and eighteen appellations currently within its boundary. Grapes grown here include Cabernet Sauvignon, Merlot, Chardonnay, Riesling, Syrah, Pinot Gris, and Sauvignon blanc. Concord grapes and other Vitis labrusca grapes are grown in the region as well. The unique climates of the area allow the Columbia Valley to produce wines that are very fruit-forward, like California wine, but which also retain some of the balance and structure of European wine.

== Name ==
The name "Columbia Valley" was derived from the river that flows through and defines the region. In 1792, the river was named after the American-built 212-ton fully-rigged ship "Columbia Rediviva" commanded by Captain Robert Gray when he discovered the river mouth on the Pacific coast and navigated into it. In 1804–1806, the Lewis and Clark Pacific Expedition explored and mapped the area, as their maps detail both the Columbia River and the Columbia Valley. Later, other explorers and pioneers referred to the treeless basin in Washington, Oregon, and Idaho as the "Columbia Valley", "Columbia Plain", "Great Columbia Plain", " Columbia Plateau", "Columbia Basin" and "Inland Empire." The term "Columbia Valley" is widely used today to refer to the viticultural area, and appears in literature, magazines, newspapers, and illustrated in maps.

== History ==
Grapes are not indigenous to the Columbia Valley viticultural area, but both Vinifera and Labruscavines are grown. The oldest planted Vinifera vines still in existence were planted by German immigrants in the Tampico vicinity, west of Union Gap, in 1871. Others were planted in the Kennewick area in 1895, and in the Walla Walla area by 1899. Planting of premium Vinifera grapes began in the Columbia Valley in the mid-1960s. By 1981 there were over 6,610 acres (2,675 ha) of Vinifera grapes including 2,700 acres (1,093 ha) of bearing vineyards. Predominant varieties include White Riesling, Chenin Blanc, Chardonnay, Cabernet Sauvignon, Gewurztraminer, Merlot, Semilion, Sauvignon Blanc, Muscat, Pinot Noir, and Grenache. Nearly 20,000 acres (8,094 ha) of Concord grapes also grow within the appellation, but are not used for wine production.

== Terroir ==
The Columbia River, viewed from The Gorge Amphitheatre in George, Wash., is the heart of the Columbia Valley AVA

=== Topography ===
The Columbia Valley is a large, treeless basin surrounding the Yakima, Snake and Columbia Rivers in Washington and Oregon while all surrounding areas are forested. The area is distinguished by its broadly undulating or rolling surface, cut by rivers and broken by long sloping basaltic uplifts extending generally in an east–west direction. The area is dominated by its major rivers. The Cascade Range forms its western boundary with the Palouse regions bordering the area to the east. To the north, the Okanogan Highlands form the boundary while on the east, the Greater Spokane area and the eastern portion of the high rolling Palouse Prairie constitute the boundary of the valley. The southern boundary is defined by the Blue Mountains, the 2,000 feet (610 m) contour line and the foothills of the Cascade Mountains southwest of the Columbia River. Elevation in surrounding areas exceeds 2,000 feet (610 m) while the elevation in the Columbia Valley generally does not exceed 2,000 feet (610 m). It encompasses the valleys formed by the Columbia River and its tributaries, including the Walla Walla, the Snake, and Yakima Rivers. Columbia Valley stretches between the 46th parallel and 47th parallel which puts it in line with the well-known French wine growing regions of Bordeaux and Burgundy. The northern latitude gives the areas two more hours of additional daylight during the summer growing season than California wine regions receive. Columbia Valley's soils were formed by the Missoula Floods, a series of cataclysmic events over 15,000 years ago. Most vineyards lie below the floodwaters, with soils of windblown deposits of sand and silt loess, overlying gravel and slackwater sediment with a basaltic bedrock. The volcanic and sandy loam soil of the valley offers good drainage and is poor in nutrients, ideal in forcing the vine to concentrate its resources into the grape clusters.

Eighteen appellations currently designate separate viticultural areas with their unique properties within the vast Columbia Valley area but share common characteristics. They are Ancient Lakes of the Columbia Valley, Candy Mountain, Goose Gap, Horse Heaven Hills, Rattlesnake Hills, Lake Chelan, Naches Heights, Red Mountain, The Rocks District of Milton-Freewater, Rocky Reach, Rocky Slope, Snipes Mountain, The Burn of Columbia Valley, Walla Walla Valley, Wahluke Slope and Yakima Valley. North of the Rattlesnake Hills is a region commonly known as Columbia Cascade, but it is not a recognized American viticultural area. Other distinctive wine growing regions that have not yet partitioned for AVA status include the Othello region located in Adams County and the Tri-Cities area around the towns of Kennewick, Pasco and Richland.

=== Climate ===
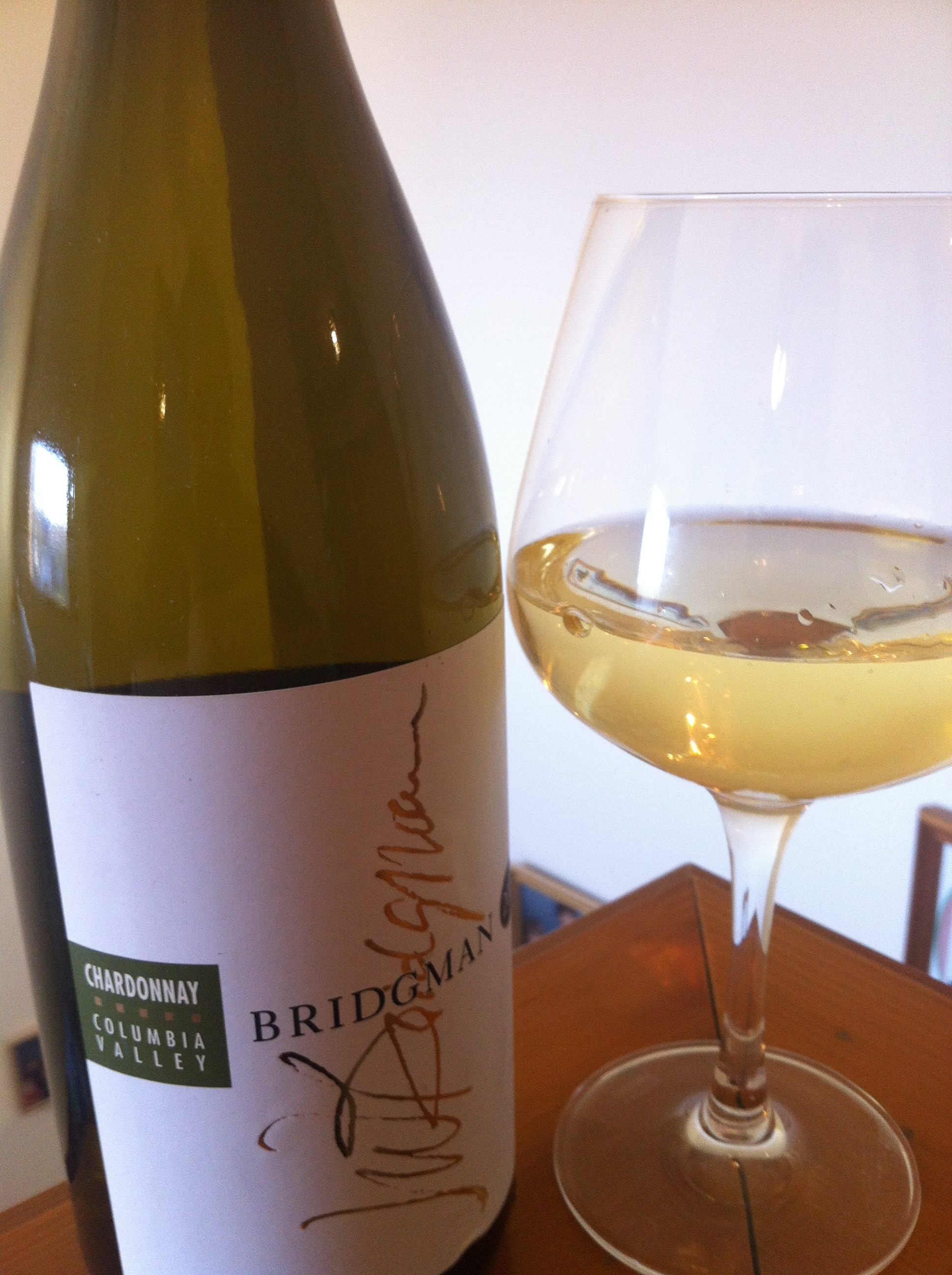
Columbia Valley Chardonnay

Climate differentiates the Columbia Valley viticultural area from surrounding areas. In general, the Columbia Valley viticultural area is characterized as experiencing a growing season of over 150 days, a total degree day average of over 2,000, and annual rainfall of 15 inches (381 mm) or less. Most of the land in the Oregon portion of the Columbia Valley is located on north facing slopes. This differs from Washington State where nearly all vineyards are located on south facing slopes. This difference makes the Oregon portion of the valley physically and climatologically distinct from Washington.

The vast size of the appellation allows for an array of diverse microclimates among the various sub-appellations, but the entire region shares the common climate traits of cold winters and long dry growing seasons with low humidity. The warm days and cool nights of the area help retain the balance of acid and sugar levels in the grape which give Washington wines their characteristic balance in flavors. The peak ripening of the grapes occurs during the last four to six weeks of the growing season, with the grapes hanging on the vines a little longer than in California. This allows the grape more time to develop maturity in tannins as well as other aroma and profile characteristics that will be brought out in the resulting wines. The longer growing season also allows the grapes to be harvested at a cooler temperature than in other more southerly wine regions. Deep winter freezes are the main climate threat to the grape growing industry of the Columbia Valley. Temperatures can drop from 40 °F (4 °C) to less than 0 °F (−18 °C) in a matter of hours. Many vineyards incorporate wind turbines to maintain air circulation around the grapes and stay warm enough to prevent frost. In most years, the vines enter into a long winter dormancy rather than freeze, which helps the vines come out of the winter and into the growing season healthier.

==== Growing season ====
As outlined in the petitions, frost free days (32 °F (0 °C)) within the Columbia Valley average 150 or more per year. The growing season ranges from a high of 204 days at The Dalles to 201 days at Chelan, Wash.; 194 days at the Grand Coulee Dam and at Milton-Freewater, Oreg.; 186 days at Ephrata, Wash.; 184 days at Kennewick and Yakima; 175 days at Brewster, Wash.; 171 days at Walla Walla; 164 days at Wasco, Oreg.; 157 days at Clarkston Heights, Wash.; and 152 days at Moro and Heppner, Oregon. Areas outside the Columbia Valley experience a growing season of less than 150 days with seasons averaging 128 days at Goldendale, Wash.; 132 days at Cle Elum, Wash.; 87 days at Plain, Wash.; 124 days at Colville, Wash.; 121 days at Colfax, Wash.; and 137 days at Dufur, Oregon. The portion of the Columbia Valley lying between the Snake River and Banks Lake was deleted from the viticultural area because it experiences a shorter growing season similar to areas outside the Columbia Valley (Colfax 121 days, Ritzville 137 days, Moses Lake 143 days, Odessa 124 days, Hatton 135 days, Wilson Creek 130 days).

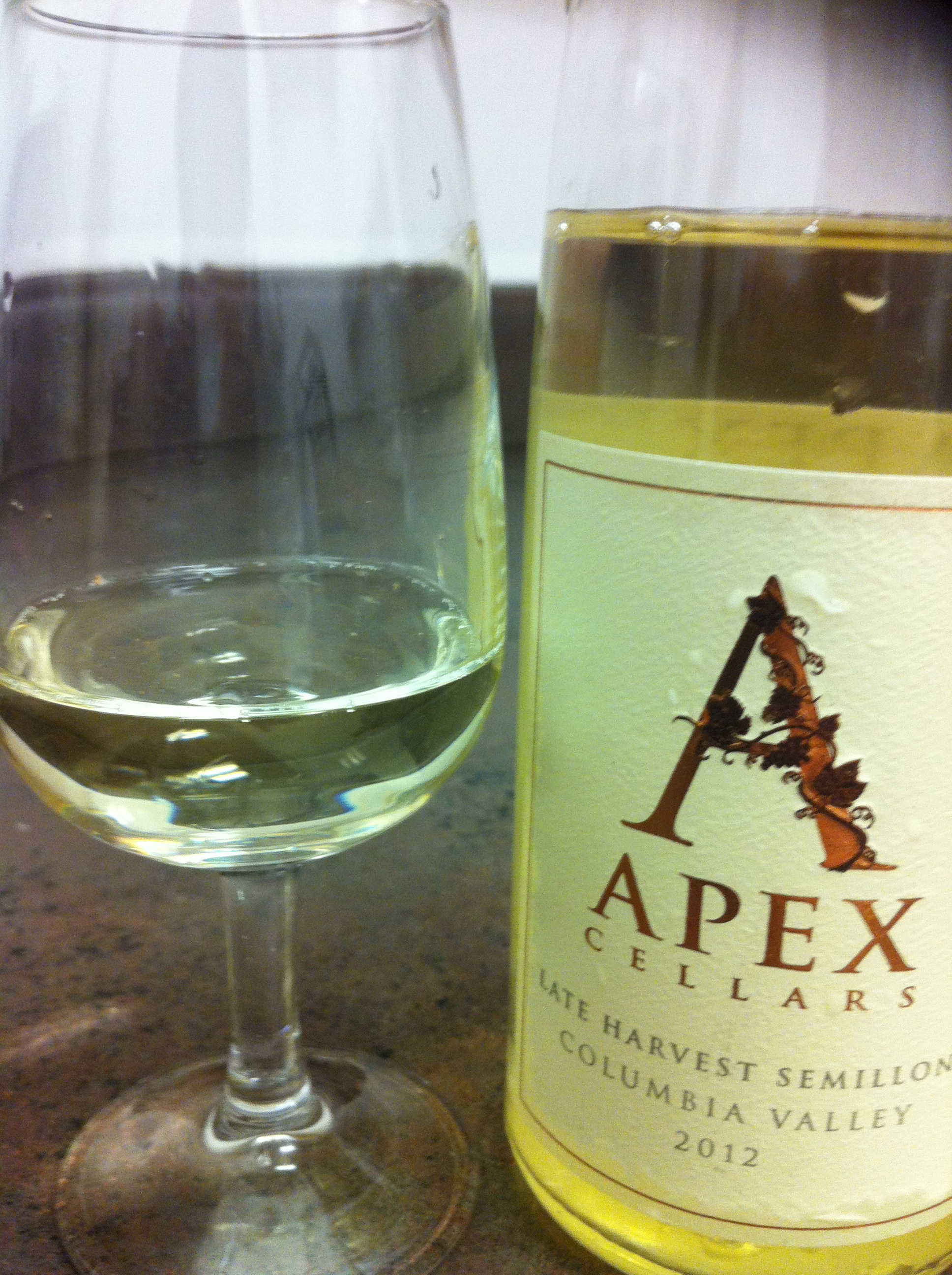
Columbia Valley Late Harvest Semillon

==== Degree days ====
Total degree days as measured by the scale developed by Winkler and Amerine of the University of California, Davis range between 2,000 and 3.000 for areas within the Columbia Valley although some locations experience readings well in excess of 3.000 degree days. Typical readings are 2,636 degree days at Kennewick, Wash.; 2,666 at Sunnyside, Wash.; 2,274 at Yakima; 2,818 at Wenatchee, Wash.; 2,512 at Grand Coulee Dam, Wash.; ,605 at Clarkston Heights, Wash.; 2,881 at Walla Walla (FAA); 3,230 at Richland, Wash.; 3,014 at The Dalles; 2,073 at Moro, Oreg.; 2,040 at Heppner, Oreg.; 3,006 at Milton-Freewater, Oreg.; and 2,711 degree days at Pendleton, Oreg. Surrounding areas experience less than 2,000 degree days with 1,820 at Goldendale, Wash.; 1,678 at Cle Elum, Wash.; and 1,901 degree days at Colville, Washington.

==== Rainfall ====
In Columbia Valley, rainfall is less than 15 inches (381 mm) annually, ranging from 6 to 9.9 inches (152.4–251.5 mm) throughout Benton County, Wash., to 10 inches (254 mm) in Wenatchee, Wash.; 15 inches (381 mm) in Walla Walla; 13 inches (330 mm) in Clarkston Heights, Wash.; 14 inches (356 mm) at The Dalles; 12 inches (305 mm) at Moro, Oreg.; 13.5 inches (343 mm) at Milton-Freewater, Oreg.; and 13 inches (330 mm) at Pendleton. Rainfall in surrounding areas is higher, with an annual average of 17 inches (432 mm) at Goldendale, Wash.; 22 inches (559 mm) at Cle Elum, Wash.; 17 inches (432 mm) at Colville, Wash.; and 39 inches (991 mm) at Mill Creek, Washington.

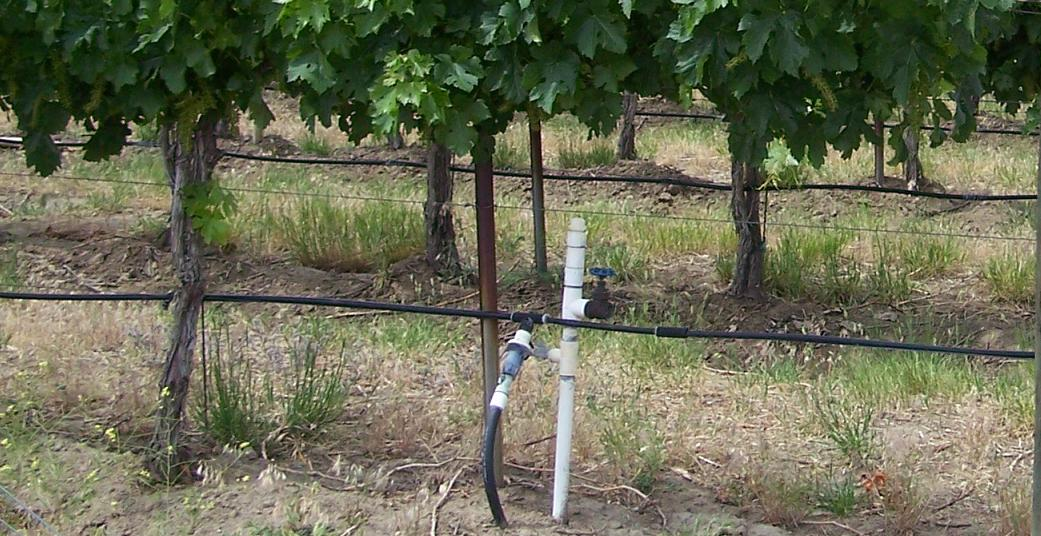
Vineyards use drip irrigation systems to better regulate water vines receive.

== Irrigation ==
The rain shadow of the Cascade Range leaves the Columbia Valley with some areas receiving less than 6 inches (15 cm) of annual rainfall. The development of intricate irrigation systems has allowed this area to become a premium grape growing region. Using water from the nearby Columbia, Snake, Yakima and Walla Walla Rivers growers are able to precisely control the timing and amount of water that the vines receive. This control over the vines' potential vigor has a large influence on better yields and fruit quality.

== Columbia Valley Viticultural Areas _{(as of 2026)} ==
- Yakima Valley (Est. Apr 1983; 708,782 acres (1,107 sq mi))
  - Red Mountain (Est. Apr 2001; 4,040 acres (6 sq mi))
  - Rattlesnake Hills (Est. Feb 2006; 68,500 acres (107 sq mi))
  - Snipes Mountain (Est. Jan 2009;4,145 acres (6 sq mi))
  - Candy Mountain (Est. Sep 2020; 815 acres (1 sq mi))
  - Goose Gap (Est. Jul 2021; 8,129 acres (13 sq mi))
- Walla Walla Valley (Est. Feb 1984; 178,560 acres (279 sq mi) )
- Horse Heaven Hills (Est. Jul 2005; 570,000 acres (891 sq mi))
- Wahluke Slope (Est. Dec 2005; 81,000 acres (127 sq mi)}
- Lake Chelan (Est. Apr 2009; 24,040 acres (38 sq mi))
- Naches Heights (Est. Dec 2011; 13,254 acres (21 sq mi))
- Ancient Lakes of Columbia Valley {Est. Oct 2012; 162,762 acres (254 sq mi)}
- The Rocks District of Milton-Freewater {Est. Feb 2015; 3,770 acres (6 sq mi))
- Royal Slope (Est. Sep 2020; 156,389 acres (244 sq mi))
- The Burn of Columbia Valley (Est. Jun 2021; 16,870 acres (26 sq mi))
- White Bluffs (Est. Jun 2021; 93,738 acres (146 sq mi))
- Rocky Reach (Est. Jun 2022; 32,000 acres (50 sq mi))
- Beverly, Washington (Est. Oct 2024; 2,415 acres (4 sq mi))
- Columbia Hills (Est. Aug 2026; 32,000 acres (50 sq mi))

== See also ==
- Washington wine
- Oregon wine
