= The Rocks District of Milton-Freewater AVA =

American Viticultural Area in Oregon

Coordinates: 45°55′52″N 118°25′08″W

The Rocks District of Milton-Freewater
- Wine region
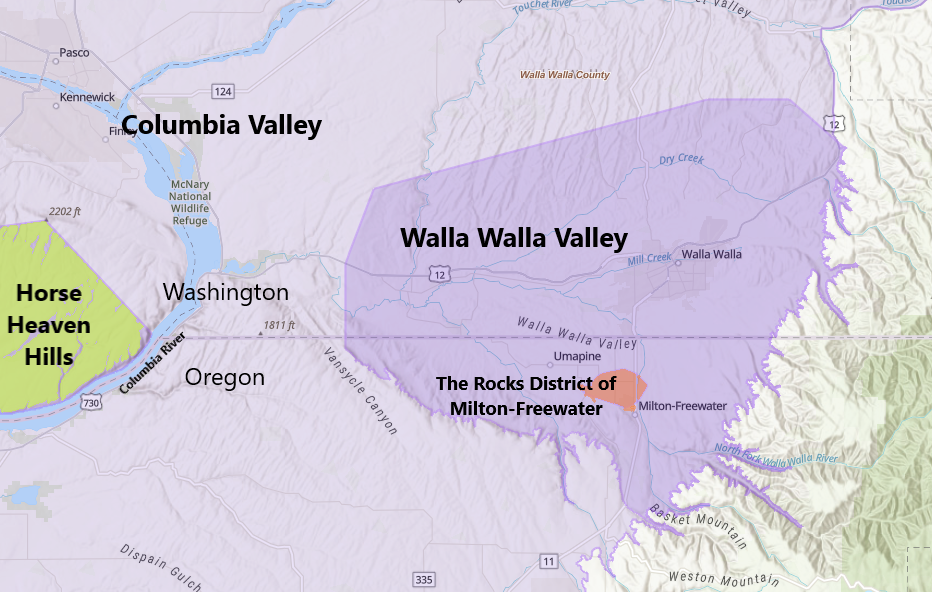
- Other names: The Rocks of Milton-Freewater, The Rocks District
- Type: American Viticultural Area
- Year established: 2015
- Country: United States
- Part of: Oregon, Columbia Valley AVA, Walla Walla Valley AVA
- Growing season: 197 days
- Climate region: Region III
- Heat units: 3,053 GDD units
- Precipitation (annual average): 14.49 inches (368 mm)
- Soil conditions: cobbly and gravelly silt loam
- Total area: 3,770 acres (6 sq mi)
- Size of planted vineyards: 472 acres (191 ha)
- No. of vineyards: 33
- Grapes produced: Cabernet Franc, Grenache, Malbec, Syrah, Tempranillo, Viognier
- No. of wineries: 23

The Rocks District of Milton-Freewater or The Rocks of Milton-Freewater (known locally as "The Rocks District") is an American Viticultural Area (AVA) located in Umatilla County, Oregon and entirely within the Walla Walla Valley and the vast Columbia Valley AVAs. It was established as the nation's 228th, Oregon's eighteenth and Columbia Valley's eleventh appellation on February 9, 2015, by the Alcohol and Tobacco Tax and Trade Bureau (TTB), Treasury after reviewing the petition submitted by Dr. Kevin R. Pogue, a professor of geology at Whitman College in Walla Walla, Washington, proposing the viticultural area named "The Rocks District of Milton-Freewater."

The appellation lies entirely within the Oregon portion of the Walla Walla Valley AVA that partially expands across Walla Walla County. It is named for the city of Milton-Freewater, Oregon and a unique alluvial fan resulting in rocky soils with "baseball sized" basalt cobbles covering the earth, and is notable as being "the only AVA in the United States whose boundaries are defined by the soil type." Unique wine flavors are said to result from the mineral composition, hydrology, and temperatures of the volcanic rocks. (Note: "Vines struggle to grow, resulting in tiny grapes of amazing flavor intensity. And yes, the wines show the sort of flavors that fall under the heading of "minerality," although to my taste it's more like black olive and tar.": Steiman 2013)

== History ==
The Rocks District of Milton–Freewater AVA is located on an alluvial fan of the Walla Walla River and derives its name from the cobblestone-rich soil near the town of Milton–Freewater, Oregon. The towns of Milton and Freewater were founded in the late 1800s and merged in 1951 to become Milton–Freewater. Washington State geologist and terroir consultant Kevin Pogue submitted the petition to TTB proposing an area named "The Rocks District of Milton-Freewater." The AVA petition was published for comment in the Federal Register in February 2014, and established in February 2015.

== Labeling controversy ==
The Rocks District lies only in the state of Oregon, unlike the Walla Walla Valley appellation. This has implications applying the appellation on wines produced in Oregon and Washington. Since Federal rules require wines to be fully finished in the state in which the AVA lies, only Oregon wineries, (Note: Sullivan states only Cayuse, Otis Kenyon, Watermill, Don Carlo Vineyard and Zerba wineries meet the criterion.) out of the more than 100 wineries in the Walla Walla Valley, would be permitted to use The Rocks District appellation on their labels. (Note: "[The Rocks AVA] petition is surrounded by a bit of controversy because it is wholly within Oregon though entirely within the Walla Walla Valley. Under current TTB labeling rules, Washington wineries that use grapes from "The Rocks" would not be able to use the "The Rocks District" name on their labels. Instead, they would need to refer to the Washington state label of "Walla Walla Valley." This applies to every Washington state winery since only Oregon wineries can use the designation.") Also, all Oregon wineries processing 85% of the AVA's fruit in a vintage can display the appellation name on the labels. (Note: "[Wineries in] Portland, hundreds of miles away, can and do make wines from AVA grapes, therefore, they can use 'The Rocks District' on their labels.") This caused some, labeled "prominent dissenters" by Wine Spectator's Harvey Steiman, to oppose the AVA. Other reactions were less pointed with some wine publishers using terms like "a bit of controversy" and "the location...creates some nuances". One of the same publishers said a "sub-appellation was ... inevitable given the uniqueness of the soils and resulting wines."

== Terroir ==
=== Climate ===
The climate within The Rocks District has long been recognized as well suited to orchards and vineyards, which were first planted in the area in the late 1800s. Today, this area is the most productive orchard district in the Walla Walla Valley, as is apparent on the 1964 Milton-Freewater 7.5 minute topographic sheet, which shows most of the area of the AVA covered with the pattern of green dots used to designate orchards. Today, vineyards have replaced some of these orchards. The AVA lies primarily between elevations of 850 and 1,000 feet (259 and 305 m), intermediate between the floor of the Walla Walla Valley and the Blue Mountain foothills. This range of elevations is ideal for maximizing daytime warmth while reducing frost and freeze risks related to the nocturnal temperature inversions that frequently affect the lower elevations of the Walla Walla Valley. This affect is apparent even within the boundaries of the AVA, as the higher, more southerly parts, closer to the town of Milton-Freewater, generally experience morning low temperatures that are a few degrees warmer than lower areas just a mile to the north. As this petition is being prepared, the Walla Walla Valley has just experienced five consecutive days with below average morning low temperatures (Oct. 4–8, 2012). Each morning, the freezing line fell somewhere between elevations of 800 and 1,000 feet (244 and 305 m). Areas of the Walla Walla Valley below 800 feet (244 m) experienced temperatures as low as 21 °F (−6 °C), while areas higher than 1,000 feet (305 m) generally remained above freezing. Temperatures within the AVA were near freezing each morning, but damage to crops was minimized by the use of wind machines. During this event, wind machines were largely ineffective at preventing damage due to sub-freezing temperatures at elevations below 800 feet (244 m). The following climate data were obtained from the Western Regional Climate Center for weather station number 355593 (Milton). The current location of the station is 45°57' N, 118°25'W, which lies within the AVA. The average growing season (April–October) temperature computed for this station is 63.9 °F (18 °C) for the period 1928-2005 and 64.1 °F (18 °C) for the period 1981–2010. An average growing season temperature of 64 °F (18 °C) lies within the preferred temperature range of a large number of wine grape cultivars. The average growing degree-days (50 °F, April–October) was 3053 for the period 1928–2005, which places the AVA within the cooler part of Winkler Region III. Average annual precipitation for the period 1928-2005 was 14.49 inches (368 mm). The average number of frost-free days is approximately 197. Average growing season temperatures and growing degree-days for the AVA are higher than in the more elevated Blue Mountain foothills to the east and lower than the Walla Walla Valley floor to the north and west. However, due to the effects of nocturnal temperature inversions, frost-free days are fewer to the west and north in valley floor locations and greater at higher elevations to the east. Eastward of the AVA, average annual precipitation increases dramatically due to affects of orographic lifting associated with the Blue Mountains. Westward of the AVA, precipitation gradually decreases toward the center of the Columbia Basin. The climatic features that are the most characteristic of the AVA are micro-climatic variations related to the area's cobbly soils. In vineyards where the surface of the ground is covered with basalt cobbles, extra heat is supplied to the vines via infrared radiation from the sun-warmed stones. This radiant heat raises the temperatures of grape clusters, particularly if they are hanging relatively low on the trellis. Studies conducted in this area have shown that mid-day temperatures of grape clusters suspended above basalt cobblestones can be 3 to 5 °F (−16 to −15 °C) warmer than those suspend at a similar height above grass-covered vineyards. Temperature has an important influence on grape composition and hence, on the flavors and aromas of wines The USDA plant hardiness zone is 7b.

=== Geology ===
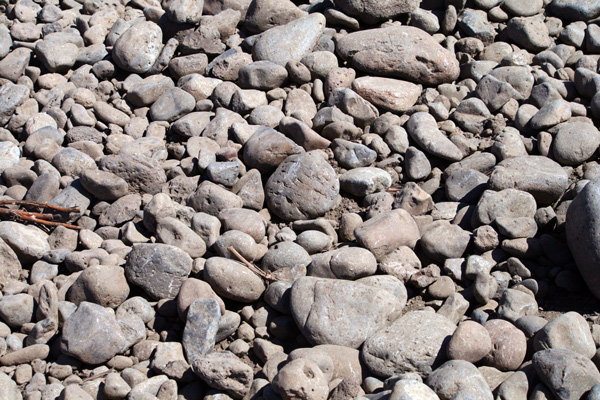
The Rocks District signature cobblestones

The AVA lies within the Columbia Plateau geologic province, which is characterized by Columbia River Basalt bedrock formed from extremely thick accumulations of Miocene lava flows. In the area just east of the AVA, the Columbia River basalt has been folded into a broad anticline and uplifted to form the Blue Mountains. Erosion of the uplifted Blue Mountains supplied basalt-derived gravel, sand, and clay that were deposited in the synclinal basin to the west. These sediments now underlie much of the Walla Walla Valley, but they are now largely concealed by more recent deposits of fine sand and silt related to Pleistocene glacial outburst floods. All areas of the Walla Walla Valley below 1,200 feet (366 m) elevation, including the AVA, were repeatedly inundated by these floods, which deposited layers of sand and silt known as the Touchet beds, as well as large erratic rocks that had been encased in flood-borne icebergs. The granite-derived minerals in the flood sediments indicate that they were derived in part from outside of the Columbia Plateau, from rocks other than basalt.

In most parts of the Walla Walla Valley, the uppermost, soil-forming layer of sediment consists of wind-deposited silt, known as loess. The loess was sourced primarily from wind erosion of Pleistocene flood deposits in upwind areas such as the Umatilla Basin. Since the loess is derived from the flood deposits, it also contains minerals derived from non-basalt sources outside of the Columbia Plateau. In some parts of the Walla Walla Valley, modern streams have removed the loess and Pleistocene flood sediments, and deposited pebbles, cobbles, and boulders of basalt derived from bedrock exposures in the Blue Mountains. Deposits of these coarse-grained basaltic sediments are especially voluminous where Mill Creek and the Walla Walla River exit their Blue Mountain canyons and enter the broad floor of the Walla Walla Valley. In both of these areas, extensive alluvial fans have been constructed where the velocity and competency of the streams was reduced as a consequence of shallow stream gradients. Mill Creek's alluvial fan now hosts the city of Walla Walla, while the alluvial fan of the Walla Walla River is an agricultural district devoted to orchards and vineyards, and includes the site of the AVA.
The geologic map shows that the AVA lies entirely within the Walla Walla River alluvial fan, within an area mostly mapped as "Quaternary younger alluvium." Records from water wells drilled within the Walla Walla River alluvial fan reveal a stratigraphy consisting of approximately 30–50 feet (9–15 m) of recent uncemented gravels overlying 400+ feet (122 m) of mixed clay, sand, and cemented gravels, which in turn overlie basalt bedrock. Due to its small size and location within a single geologic landform, the stratigraphy of the AVA is remarkably consistent. Basaltic gravels are essentially the only substrate that would be encountered by even the most deeply rooted vines. This situation is quite different from vineyards of the Walla Walla Valley AVA that lie outside the AVA, where vines are growing in loess or fine-grained alluvium of varying thickness that overlies either basalt bedrock or Touchet beds.

=== Soils ===
The most distinguishing feature of the AVA is the rockiness of its soils. Within the last ten years, the area within the boundary has come to be known as "the Rocks" region of the Walla Walla Valley AVA, but it has been famous for the fruitfulness of its stony soils for over 100 years. In an article entitled "Outsider's View of Freewater" in the December 1906 issue (p. 31) of Up-To-The-Times, a Walla Walla Valley magazine, George B. Sanderson wrote: "Rocks! Rocks!" I hear you say. Yes, but remember the best and largest strawberries grow in among these rocks, and such berries, too, as can't be raised in the East. The fruit trees are growing here in abundance. The luscious clusters of grapes are still on the vine, unhurt, as yet, by frost, and this is October." In the original Soil Survey of Umatilla County, Oregon, published in 1948, the soils of the AVA were mapped within the Yakima series as Yakima cobbly loam and Yakima gravelly loam. In 1985, these soils were re-classified within the new Freewater series as the Freewater very cobbly loam and Freewater gravelly silt loam. The urbanized cobble-rich soils of Milton-Freewater were classified as Freewater-Urban land complex. The most recent Umatilla County soil Survey, published in 1988, maps the distribution of the new Freewater series soils. The soils bordering the Freewater series that lie largely outside the boundary belong to the Walla Walla, Ellisforde, Yakima, Umapine, Hermiston, Onyx, and Oliphant series, which have been classified as silt loams in which cobbles are uncommon or absent. The textural, hydrologic, thermal, and chemical properties of the rocky soils of the AVA contrast sharply with those of the surrounding silt loam soils. The primary parent material for the Freewater series soils is basaltic alluvium derived from the erosion of the nearby Blue Mountains, while the surrounding silt loam soils were developed primarily in loess and fine-grained sediment deposited by the wind and glacial outburst floods. Coarse-grained sediment (gravel, cobbles, and occasional boulders) constitutes 50 to 85 percent of the alluvial soils that typify the AVA. Due to their coarse texture, the Freewater soils can be tilled repeatedly throughout the growing season with minimal risk of erosion. Tilling concentrates the larger rocks on the surface where they help to suppress weed growth. In contrast, Walla Walla Valley vineyards outside the AVA require cover crops to suppress weeds and inhibit the erosion of their fine-grained silt loam soils. The rocky surface created by the tilling of the AVA's Freewater series soils enhances their absorption and storage of solar energy. According to White (2003, p. 32), "The temperature regime of vineyards can be influenced by the stoniness of the soil surface. Large stones act as a heat sink during the day and slowly reradiate this heat energy during the night, creating a more favorable micro-climate in the vine rows." Both Gladstones (1992, p. 36) and Jackson (2008, p. 241) concluded that this effect reduces frost risk and promotes fuller ripening. Research in the Walla Walla Valley AVA has shown that surface and soil temperatures are higher in rock-covered vineyards. Grape clusters in the rock-covered vineyards are also hotter during the middle of the day due to infrared energy radiated by the heated stones. Due to their coarse texture, the permeability of the soils of the AVA is much greater than that of the much finer grained soils of the surrounding areas. At profile depths below 20 inches (508 mm), Freewater soils transmit water at rates in excess of 20 inches (508 mm) per hour. Permeability below a depth of 20 inches (508 mm) in the surrounding silt loam soils is less than two inches (51 mm) per hour. Because of their permeability, Freewater soils are classified as "somewhat excessively drained" as opposed to the surrounding silt loam soils, which have been classified as either "somewhat poorly drained" or "well drained." The drainage characteristics of the Freewater soils, which more efficiently transmit water to deeper soil horizons, encourages vines planted in them to be more deeply rooted compared to the vines in the surrounding silt loam soils.

As noted in the geology section above, the mineralogy of the loess and flood-deposited sediment indicates that they were sourced, in part, from a granitic parent outside the Columbia Plateau. Chemical analyses reveal that Freewater soils contain higher concentrations of elements more common in basalt such as calcium, titanium, and iron, relative to the surrounding silt loam soils. Weathering of the basaltic parent of the Freewater soils also produces significantly higher concentrations of plant-available iron than are commonly found in other viticultural soils within the Walla Walla Valley AVA. Iron is an important micronutrient for grapevines that is critical to many biological functions such as photosynthesis, respiration, and assimilation of macronutrients.

== Vintage ratings ==
Wine Spectator's two top-rated Northwest wines as of 2013, both Syrah vintages sourced in The Rocks District, scored 98 out of 100.

== Sources ==
- Geology and terroir of the Walla Walla AVA, Cayuse Vineyards, 2014
- Degerman, Eric (March 3, 2014), Oregon winery restriction sparks comments on The Rocks AVA petition, Great Northwest Wine
- Hermann, Chris; Kipp, Bernie (March 6, 2014), "Conditions For Using Multi-state AVAs On Wine Labels", Alcoholic beverages law blog, Stoel Rives
- Holden, Ronald (April 2014), Home Grown: A celebration of local culinary enterprise, Seattle DINING!, archived from the original (—Kevin Pogue: Champion of Rocks) on September 3, 2014
- Kimbel, Lori (July 1, 2014), "Milton-Freewater Rocks District AVA awaits approval", Northeast Oregon Business News
- Kingery Ritter, Carol; Trinidad, John (March 1, 2014), TTB Proposes New Oregon AVA, Cites Wine Blogs as Support
- Marquardt, Tom; Darr, Patrick (August 1, 2014), "The Wine Guys: Walla Walla Valley prepares to welcome new AVA", Yakima Herald-Republic
- Perdue, Andy (May 2014), "Walla Walla Celebrates Syrah", Walla Walla Lifestyles
- O'Connor, Jim E., ed. (2009), Volcanoes to Vineyards: Geologic Field Trips Through the Dynamic Landscape of the Pacific Northwest (Folds, floods and fine wine: Geologic influences on the terroir of the Columbia Basin: Kevin Pogue, Department of Geology, Whitman College, Walla Walla, WA), Geological Society of America, p. 15, ISBN 9780813700151
- Richard, Terry (October 16, 2013), "Walla Walla emerges as wine-tasting haven in scenic southeast Washington", The Oregonian
- Richard, Terry (October 21, 2013), "Walla Walla's southside wine district features Milton-Freewater AVA", The Oregonian
- Richard, Terry (November 29, 2013), "Wine Spectator's newest magazine gives serious coverage to Northwest wine scene", The Oregonian
- Steiman, Harvey (February 28, 2013), "New Walla Walla AVA Faces Rocky Road" (Steiman at Large), Wine Spectator
- Sullivan, Sean (February 2013), "Proposed 'The Rocks of Milton-Freewater' AVA focuses on terroir" (PDF), Washington Wine Report
- Sullivan, Sean P. (Summer 2013), Walla Walla Valley: A Matter Of Rocks, Tasting Room magazine
- Veseth, Mike (July 22, 2014), "The Five Pillars of Walla Walla's Wine Success", The Wine Economist blog
