= Schwana, Washington =

Schwana, Washington Schawana
- Census-designated place
- Location within Washington (state) Location within the United States
- Coordinates: 46°49′17″N 119°55′24″W
- Country: United States
- State: Washington
- County: Grant

Area
  - Total: 0.26 sq mi (0.68 km^{2})
  - Land: 0.25 sq mi (0.65 km^{2})
  - Water: 0.012 sq mi (0.03 km^{2})
- Elevation: 538 ft (164 m)

Population (2020)
  - Total: 215
- Time zone: UTC-8 (Pacific (PST))
  - Summer (DST): UTC-7 (PDT)
- ZIP Code: 99321 (Beverly)
- Area code: 509
- FIPS code: 53-61925
- GNIS feature ID: 2807182

Schwana (also spelled Schawana) is an unincorporated community and census-designated place (CDP) in Grant County, Washington, United States. As of the 2020 census, it had a population of 215.

The CDP is in the southwest part of the county, on the eastern bank of the Columbia River, along Washington State Route 243. Beverly is on the northern edge of the CDP, at the Vantage Bridge connecting it with Interstate 90, with Schwana one mile to Beverly's south. The town of Mattawa is 7 miles (11 km) to the south of the CDP.

== Education ==
The area is served by the Royal School District.

== Demographics ==
Historical population
Census	Pop.	Note	%±
2020	215		—
U.S. Decennial Census

Schwana first appeared as a census designated place in the 2020 U.S. census.

=== Racial and ethnic composition ===
Schwana CDP, Washington – Racial and ethnic composition Note: the US Census treats Hispanic/Latino as an ethnic category. This table excludes Latinos from the racial categories and assigns them to a separate category. Hispanics/Latinos may be of any race.
Race / Ethnicity (NH = Non-Hispanic)	Pop 2020	2020
White alone (NH)	30	13.95%
Black or African American alone (NH)	2	0.93%
Native American or Alaska Native alone (NH)	0	0.00%
Asian alone (NH)	0	0.00%
Native Hawaiian or Pacific Islander alone (NH)	0	0.00%
Other race alone (NH)	0	0.00%
Mixed race or Multiracial (NH)	1	0.47%
Hispanic or Latino (any race)	182	84.65%
Total	215	100.00%
