= Columbia Hills AVA =

Coordinates: 45°40′12″N 121°03′45″W

Columbia Hills
- Wine region
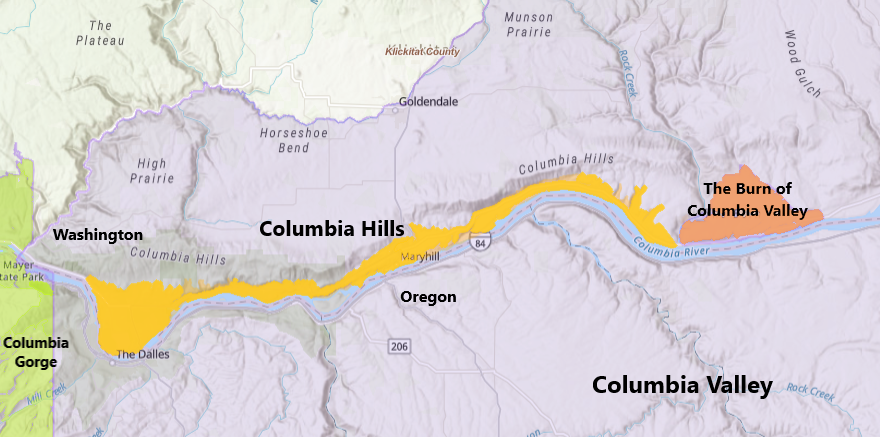
- Type: American Viticultural Area
- Year established: 2026
- Country: United States
- Part of: Washington, Klickitat County Columbia Valley AVA
- Other regions in Washington, Klickitat County Columbia Valley AVA: Columbia Gorge AVA, Horse Heaven Hills AVA, The Burn of Columbia Valley AVA
- Growing season: 194 to 254 days
- Climate region: Region III-IV
- Heat units: 3,091 to 3,588 GDD units
- Precipitation (annual average): 10 to 20 inches (254–508 mm)
- Soil conditions: Well-drained soils derived from basalt mixed with loess and wind-deposited sand draped over the bedrock
- Total area: 29,387 acres (46 sq mi)
- Size of planted vineyards: 338 acres (137 ha)
- No. of vineyards: 19
- Grapes produced: Cabernet Franc, Cabernet Sauvignon, Chardonnay, Merlot, Sauvignon Blanc, Syrah
- No. of wineries: 4
