= Frenchman Hills =

Geography
- Country: United States
- State: Washington
- County: Grant County
- Range coordinates: 46°58′29″N 119°49′20″W

The Frenchman Hills are hills in Grant County, Washington, United States of America. The high point is 1,640 feet (500 m). They are an anticlinal fold in the northeastern part of the larger Yakima Fold Belt. They likely take their name for one of the first non-native residents in the area, who lived near Low Gap in the 1860s and 1870s and was known only as The Frenchman.

== Frenchman Gap ==
Frenchman Gap (47.0°N 120.0°W) near Vantage, Washington is a water gap where the Columbia River carved a path through the Frenchman Hills.

Grandfather Cuts Loose the Ponies, also known as the Wild Horse Monument, is located on a hillside overlooking the Columbia River on the east side of Frenchman Gap.
