= Naches Heights AVA =

American Viticultural Area in Washington

Coordinates: 46°37′25″N 120°37′43″W

Naches Heights
- Wine region
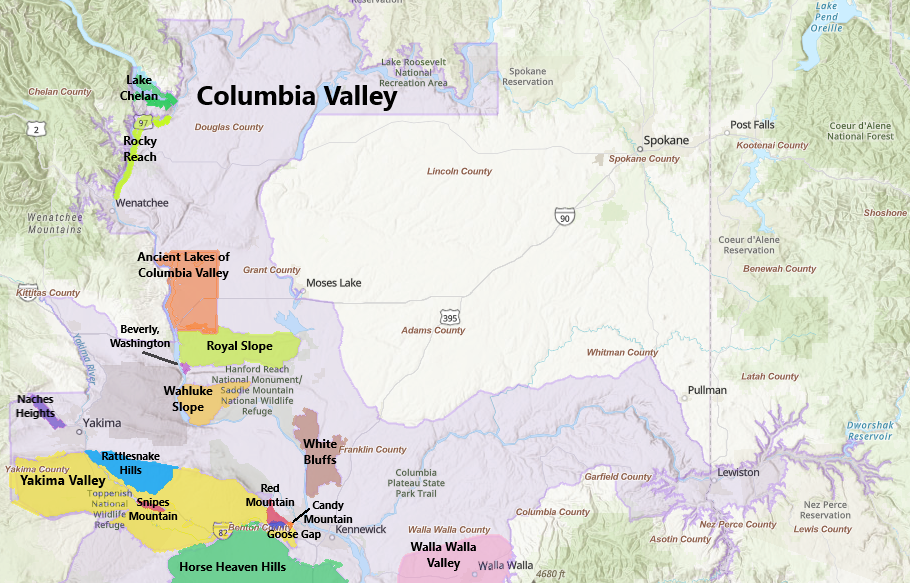
- Type: American Viticultural Area
- Year established: 2011
- Years of wine industry: 24
- Country: United States
- Part of: Washington, Columbia Valley AVA, Yakima County
- Other regions in Washington, Columbia Valley AVA, Yakima County: Rattlesnake Hills AVA, Snipes Mountain AVA, Yakima Valley AVA
- Growing season: 181 days
- Climate region: Region II
- Heat units: 2,577 GDD units
- Precipitation (annual average): 7.4 inches (188 mm)
- Total area: 13,254 acres (21 sq mi)
- Size of planted vineyards: 105 acres (42 ha)
- No. of vineyards: 7
- Grapes produced: Cabernet Franc, Cabernet Sauvignon, Malbec, Merlot, Petite Verdot, Semillon, Sauvignon Blanc, Syrah, Mourvedre, Viognier, Barbera, Nebbiolo, Sangiovese, Sagrantino, Pinot Grigio, White Muscat, Souzao, Tinta Cao, Touriga Nacional, and Tinta Roriz
- No. of wineries: 2

Naches Heights (//ˈnaʧes// NA-ches) is an American Viticultural Area (AVA) located in Yakima County, Washington on the western edge of the Columbia Basin within the Yakima Valley landform and the vast Columbia Valley AVA west of the city of Yakima. It was established as the nation's 202^{nd}, the state's twelfth and Columbia Valley's ninth appellation on December 14, 2011 by the Alcohol and Tobacco Tax and Trade Bureau (TTB), Treasury after reviewing the petition submitted by R. Paul Beveridge, owner of Wilridge Winery and Vineyard, proposing a viticultural area named "Naches Heights."

According to the petition, the appellation encompasses 13,254 acres (21 sq mi) with 105 acres (42 ha) of existing or planned cultivation on seven commercial vineyards to produce wine grapes in the foreseeable future. It was first AVA in Washington state to be fully sustainable, with every vineyard practicing either biodynamic or licensed with LIVE (Low Input Viticulture and Enology) certification. As of 2018, only 37.2 acres (15 ha) were under vine, with 80 planned acres (32 ha) making it the smallest cultivated wine region in Washington.

== Name Evidence ==
The "Naches Heights" name applies to an elevated plateau area in Yakima County, Washington, according to the petition and USGS maps. The topographical maps of Naches, Selah, Yakima West, and Wiley City define the boundaries of the viticultural area which lie between the Naches River and Cowiche Creek identify "Naches Heights" on the USGS maps as well as on a public lands map (Yakima Public Lands Quadrangle map, 2001, Washington State Department of Natural Resources), according to the petition.

== Terroir ==
=== Geography and Climate ===
The Naches Heights viticultural area is a plateau that terminates in cliffs of andesite to the north, east, and south. The andesite cliffs distinguish the viticultural area from the Naches River Valley, the Cowiche Creek Valley, and the nearby Yakima River Valley. The USGS maps show that the Naches Heights plateau is elevated in comparison to the surrounding river and creek valleys. Aerial photos submitted with the petition also show the Naches Heights plateau landform and the cliffs that surround it in contrast with the surrounding lower elevation valleys. On the far west side of the viticultural area, the andesite cliffs are subsumed by the foothills of the Cascade Mountains. Although not distinguished by steep cliffs, the western boundary line marks the end of andesite rocks and the beginning of the Cascade Mountains foothills. Elevations gradually rise heading west and northwest of the Naches Heights into the Cascade Mountains and the 3,578-foot (1,091 m) Bethel Ridge. The high mountainous elevations to the west create a rain shadow effect that protects the Naches Heights plateau from Pacific winter storms.
Elevations on the Naches Heights and along the Tieton andesite cliffs also distinguish the plateau from the surrounding regions, according the petition. The lowest elevations of the viticultural area are approximately 1,200 feet (366 m), which is at the tip of the andesite flow at the far eastern edge of the viticultural area. From this point, the cliffs rise to 1,400 feet (427 m), according to the USGS maps. The highest elevation of the plateau, located near the far western end of the viticultural area, is approximately 2,100 feet (640 m), at which point the cliffs drop immediately to 1,600 feet (488 m). The Yakima City Hall lies to the southeast of the viticultural area at 1,061 feet (323 m), a significantly lower elevation than that of the Naches Heights. As explained in the petition, cold air drains off the plateau and into the surrounding valleys, thereby reducing potential frost damage and winterkill to vineyards on the Naches Heights. The USDA plant hardiness zones are 6b and 7a.

=== Geology ===
The petition states that approximately one million years ago, the termination of andesite flow from the Cascade Mountains down the valley of the Tieton River formed the Naches Heights plateau. The Naches Heights viticultural area is located on, and encompasses, a geological formation of Tieton andesite, a volcanic rock. In contrast to the Naches Heights plateau, there are alluvial deposits, including those that are terraced and older, to the north, east, and south of the viticultural area. To the west of the area are alluvial deposits and Grande Ronde Basalt, Ringold Formation gravels, the Ellensburg Formation, and the Cascade Mountains.
Naches Heights is a plateau, ranging from 1,200 feet (370 m) to 2,100 feet (640 m). The plateau was formed by a flow of Andesite lava (reportedly the largest in the world) that traveled down the Tieton and Naches Rivers from a volcano located south of present-day Mount Rainier (now known as the Goat Rocks) and stopped just west of the City of Yakima. The presence of the Andesite lava bedrock distinguishes the Naches Heights AVA from all of the other Columbia Valley AVAs, which are located on basalt bedrock. The soil is primarily a volcanic loess called Tieton loam with some areas of Ritzville loam—with the primary difference being that Tieton loam is shallower loess influenced by Andesite, while Ritzville loam forms deeper deposits with less Andesite influence. The AVA is west of the city of Yakima. Grapes in this area must be irrigated.

=== Soils ===
After the volcanic flow of andesite cooled and hardened to form the Naches Heights plateau, pockets of loess, or wind-blown soil, were deposited on the plateau. After a period of about 1 million years marked by winds and volcanic eruptions in the Cascades, deep beds of unique soils formed in the loess pockets on the plateau. The predominant soils on the plateau are Tieton loam and Ritzville silt loam. According to the petition, the only major difference between Tieton loam and Ritzville silt loam is that the latter formed in deeper pockets of loess, thus creating a very consistent soil type throughout the proposed viticultural area. The Naches Heights plateau landform, according to the NRCS web soil survey, has generally deep loess soils with adequate drainage and deep rooting depths conducive to successful viticulture. Further, the grape vine roots are not prone to freezing, or winterkill, in the deep plateau soils. Unlike the plateau, much of the greater Columbia Valley region that surrounds the Naches Heights was covered by alluvial material deposited by the ancient Missoula Floods. Hence, the viticultural area is surrounded mainly by gravelly alluvial soils readily distinguishable from the Tieton loam and Ritzville silt loam of Naches Heights. Harwood loam, a transitional soil formed in both loess and alluvium, is located in small areas of the southern portion of the Naches Heights that is outside the boundary line of the proposed viticultural area. Rocks, cobbles, and shallow rooting depths are characteristics of the lower elevation valley region that surrounds the Naches Heights plateau, according to the NRCS data. In the valley region, the cold air from the surrounding mountain elevations drains onto the valley floor and ponds to create stagnant, cold air environments that make vine growth difficult during some seasons, the petition explains. Unlike the Naches Heights soils, the valley and floodplain soils, including the Weirman, Wenas, and Kittitas series, are subject to seasonal flooding and a water table close to the surface of the soil, according to NRCS data. In addition, the valley vines have shallow rooting depths that can reach the water table and be frozen during extreme cold weather. Further, seasonal flooding can affect some portions of the surrounding valley area.

== Vineyards ==
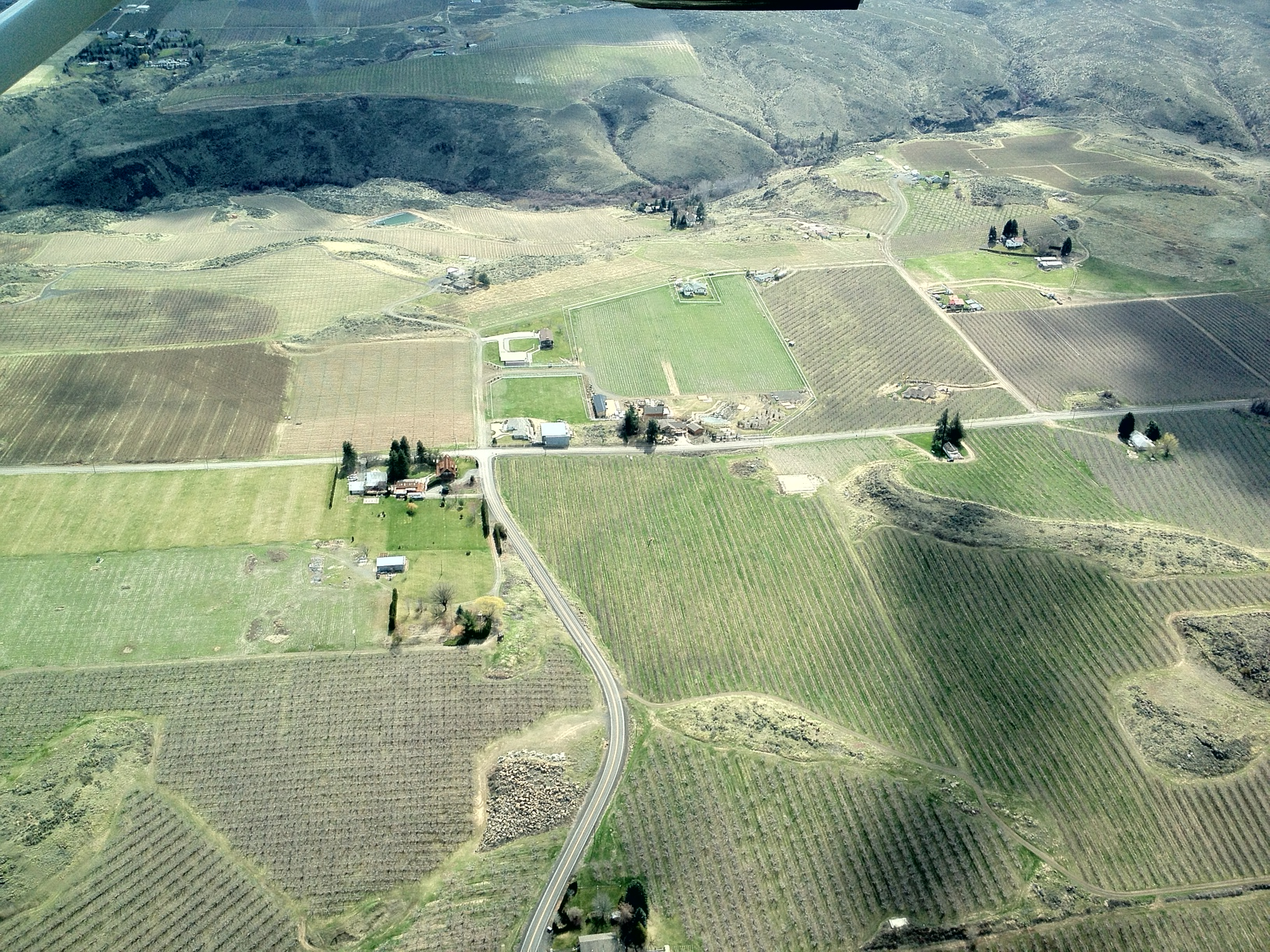
Naches Heights vineyard

The appellation's vineyards include Wilridge Vineyard, Naches Heights Vineyard, Strand Vineyard, Treveri Vineyard, Keller Vineyard, and Kalkruth Vineyard. Wilridge Vineyard is owned by Wilridge Winery of Seattle with 14 acres (6 ha) currently cultivated. Naches Heights Vineyards was the first vineyard in this area. Wilridge Winery established the first winery and the first tasting room in the area. In 2017, Wilridge established the first distillery in the AVA.

== Grape varieties ==
The grape varieties currently grown include:

- Five red Bordeaux varieties; Cabernet Franc, Cabernet Sauvignon, Malbec, Merlot and Petite Verdot
- Two white Bordeaux varieties; Semillon and Sauvignon Blanc
- Three Burgundy varieties: Pinot Noir, Chardonnay and Pinot Meunier
- Four Rhone varieties; Syrah, Mourvedre, Roussanne and Viognier
- Italian varietals; Barbera, Gewurtztraminer, Nebbiolo, Sangiovese, Sagrantino (the first such planting in Washington State) and Pinot Grigio
- One of the Muscat grapes called White Muscat (also known as Muscat Canelli, Moscato, or Muscat de Petite Grains),
- Five Portuguese varieties; Sezao (formerly Souzao), Tinta Cao, Touriga Nacional, Touriga Franca, and Tinta Roriz.
- The Austrian variety Zweigelt
