= Snipes Mountain AVA =

American Viticultural Area in Washington

Coordinates: 46°22′20″N 120°06′05″W

Snipes Mountain
- Wine region
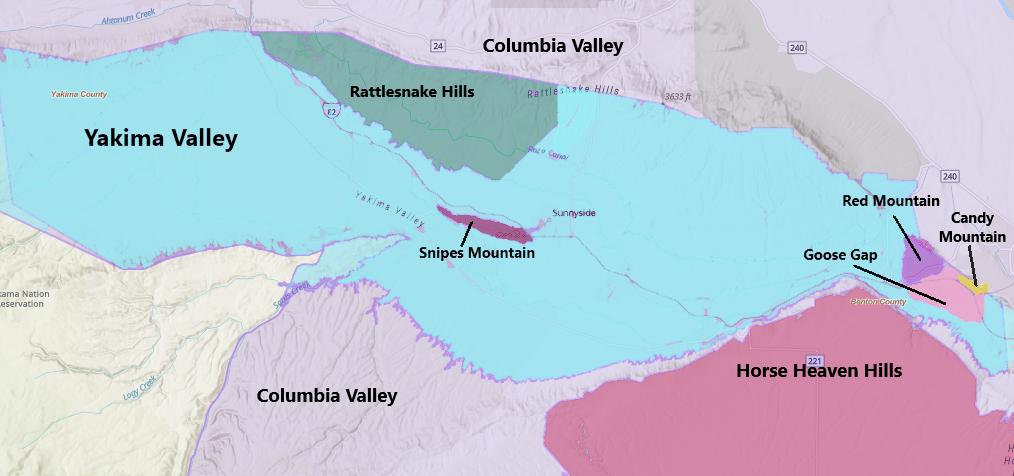
- Type: American Viticultural Area
- Year established: 2009
- Years of wine industry: 109
- Country: United States
- Part of: Washington, Columbia Valley AVA, Yakima County, Yakima Valley AVA
- Other regions in Washington, Columbia Valley AVA, Yakima County, Yakima Valley AVA: Rattlesnake Hills AVA
- Growing season: 150 days
- Climate region: Region II
- Heat units: 2,842 GDD units
- Precipitation (annual average): 5.8 inches (147 mm)
- Soil conditions: Aridisols and Mollisols soil series
- Total area: 4,145 acres (6 sq mi)
- Size of planted vineyards: 859 acres (348 ha)
- Grapes produced: Cabernet Sauvignon, Cabernet Franc, Chardonnay, Chenin Blanc, Merlot, Mourvèdre, Muscat, Pinot Gris, Pinot Noir, Riesling, Sauvignon Blanc, Semillon, Syrah
- No. of wineries: 4

Snipes Mountain is an American Viticultural Area (AVA) located in Yakima County in south-central Washington in the southeast corner of the Yakima River valley landform approximately 25 miles (40 km) southeast of Yakima between the towns of Sunnyside and Granger around Outlook, Washington. It was established as the nation's 191st and the state's tenth appellation on January 21, 2009 by the Alcohol and Tobacco Tax and Trade Bureau (TTB), Treasury after reviewing the petition submitted by Mr. Todd Newhouse of the Upland Winery in Outlook, Washington, on behalf of the local grape growers, proposing the viticultural area named "Snipes Mountain."
The 4,145-acre (1,677 ha) wine region is the state's second smallest after Red Mountain becoming the third sub-appellation within the Yakima Valley and the seventh within the vast Columbia Valley. The region has one of Washington's oldest viticultural histories.

== History ==
Snipes Mountain was named for Ben Snipes, an early Yakima County pioneer in the late 1850s built his home at the base of a mountain and developed an expansive cattle operation and by 1861 he became known throughout the Northwest as the Cattle King. This history can be found in a talk given by Roscoe Sheller of Sunnyside in 1958 and in his book Ben Snipes: Northwest Cattle King.
Grapes were first established on Harrison Hill, within the AVA boundaries in 1914. On Snipes Mountain, Upland Vineyards was first established in 1917 by Washington pioneer vintner William B. Bridgman, an attorney and two-time mayor of Sunnyside in the early 1900s whose family grew Concord grapes in Ontario, Canada. Bridgman planted wine grapes on Snipes Mountain and Harrison Hill. The vineyard was one of the first to plant the European Vitis vinifera varieties of Semillon and Pinot Noir becoming one of the first vintages of Washington wine and foreseeing Snipes Mountain’s unique viticultural promise. Soon thereafter tree fruits were established due to the suitable growing conditions with a diversity of high value crops grown on Snipes Mountain, including apricots, prune plums, cherries and a number of varieties of wine grapes. A winery was established in 1934, but was abandoned in 1972 due to the lack of market demand for Washington wines. Efforts began to re-establish the historical Upland Winery. The second oldest Cabernet Sauvignon vines in Washington State have been growing for some 40 years in vineyards on Harrison Hill. These vines have been producing award-winning wines for 15 years. On Snipes Mountain, the Upland Winery, which operated from 1934 to 1972, is being reestablished as a historic winery. At the time of the petition, the 535 acres (217 ha) of vineyards in the region cultivated 25 varietals. As of 2025, approximately 859 acres (348 ha) are under vine.

== Terroir ==
=== Topography ===
The viticultural area is centered around Snipes Mountain, a seven-mile long (11 km) anticline ridge with a 1,290 feet (393 m) peak that rises from the floor of the Yakima Valley with comparatively unique, rocky soils, called Aridisols. The viticultural area also includes Harrison Hill, which lies contiguously east of Snipes Mountain and has similar soil and topography. Snipes Mountain and adjacent Harrison Hill rise visibly from the Yakima Valley floor. The USGS Sunnyside and Granger maps show that the 1,301-foot (397 m) pinnacle of Snipes Mountain contrasts with the 680-to-780-foot (207–238 m) elevations of the surrounding valley floor. The petitioner notes that about a third of the Yakima Valley viticultural area is level, and cites the digital elevation maps of the Yakima Valley and Snipes Mountain from Washington State 10m Digital Elevation Model data. The north side slopes of Snipes Mountain gradually increase in elevation but the south side slopes are steeper. As shown on USGS maps, the south side slopes increase from 850 to 1,200 feet (259–366 m) in elevation over a short distance. The petition notes that these steeper slopes are suited to viticulture because they have good air drainage, which helps to prevent spring and fall frost damage to the plants in the vineyards.

=== Climate ===
Snipes Mountain viticultural area, like much of Eastern Washington, is located in the rain shadow of the Cascade Mountains which contributes to the warm and dry climate of the region. The USDA plant hardiness zones are 7a and 7b.

=== Geology and Soils ===
Soil deposits below the area are composed of gravels and settlements left by ancient river beds that the Columbia River once followed. These deposits range in size from that of a human fist to large melons. The mountain itself was created by fault activity. The petitioner notes that, according to the Washington Division of Geology and Earth Resources, the geology of central Washington consists mainly of a volcanic basalt mantle 10 to 15 million years old. Further study shows that subsequent alluvial events covered portions of the Yakima Valley, creating the Ellensburg Formation. The Ellensburg Formation consists of a conglomerate of round, river-washed rocks and coarse sediment; tectonic uplift in the Ellensburg Formation created Snipes Mountain.
The petitioner describes the soils in the viticultural area based on the Soil Survey of the Yakima County Area, Washington, (U.S. Department of Agriculture, Soil Conservation Service, 1985). The petition provides a table that compares soil series in the established Yakima Valley viticultural area with those in the Snipes Mountain viticultural area. This comparison, based on parent material of the soils, shows that the soils in each region formed under differing geological events. Almost all soils on Snipes Mountain, deposited by an ancient flood, now generally are dry. The soils on the mountain also are older and have more rock fragments than those elsewhere in the Yakima Valley region. According to the petition, one third of the soils in the Yakima Valley viticultural area formed in alluvium and 30 percent of the soils formed in loess over lacustrine deposits. In contrast, within the Snipes Mountain viticultural area only 3.32 percent of the soils formed in alluvium. These soils are of small extent because tectonic uplift exposed the southwest face of Snipes Mountain, lifting it above the influence of additional alluvial deposits. Warden soils formed in loess over lacustrine deposits, and these soils cover 53 percent of the Snipes Mountain viticultural area. Typically, these soils are on the north and northeast-facing slopes, in positions where the parent material was in place prior to tectonic uplift. The Harwood- Burke-Wiehl soils comprise 13.6 percent of the soils in the viticultural area, compared to less than 1 percent of the entire Yakima Valley viticultural area. On Snipes Mountain 82 percent of the soils are classified as Aridisols, which are soils low in organic matter and found in generally dry areas. In the Yakima Valley 47 percent of the soils are classified as Aridisols, but 43 percent are classified as Mollisols, which are soils that have a deep, dark surface horizon and a high organic matter content. Typically, Mollisols are in low lying areas near ground water that supplies moisture to plants ultimately increasing the accumulation of organic matter. According to the petitioner, vineyards on the south-facing slopes of Harrison Hill have produced highly valued grapes. The soils on Harrison Hill and Snipes Mountain are similar.
