= Central Washington =

- Region
- Map of Central Washington. Counties highlighted in red are always included, while counties highlighted in pink are sometimes included.
- Coordinates: 47°30′N 120°0′W
- Country: United States
- State: Washington

Central Washington is a region of the U.S. state of Washington between the western and eastern parts of the state extending from the border with the Canadian province of British Columbia in the north to the border with the U.S. state of Oregon in the south. Generally, the western edge is the Cascade Range and the eastern edge is in the vicinity of the 119th meridian west.

Central Washington is also further divided into North Central and South Central. Washington State Department of Transportation uses these groupings as part of their district office divisions.

- North Central Washington, or NCW, is defined as including Chelan, Douglas, and Okanogan counties. The Washington State Department of Transportation and the North Central Region Library includes Grant County In addition, the library system and the Heritage Museum includes Ferry County. Wenatchee is the largest city in this region.
- South Central Washington includes Benton, Kittitas, Klickitat, and Yakima Counties, in addition to all counties south of the Snake River, in the Department of Transportation use of the term. Yakima is the largest city in this region.

== Counties ==
Central Washington is made up of the following counties:

- Benton
- Chelan
- Douglas
- Grant
- Kittitas
- Klickitat
- Okanogan
- Yakima

== Cities of note ==
- Chelan
- East Wenatchee
- Ellensburg
- Ephrata
- Moses Lake
- Omak
- Wenatchee
- Yakima
- Quincy

== Colleges and universities ==
- Central Washington University in Ellensburg
- Washington State University Tri-Cities in Richland
- Heritage University in Toppenish
- Wenatchee Valley College in Wenatchee
- Big Bend Community College in Moses Lake
- Yakima Valley College in Yakima

== Notable mountain ranges ==
- Cascade Range
- Chiwaukum Mountains
- Stuart Range
- Wenatchee Mountains
