= The Burn of Columbia Valley AVA =

Viticultural area in Washington, USA

Coordinates: 45°45′26″N 120°22′55″W

The Burn of Columbia Valley
- Wine region
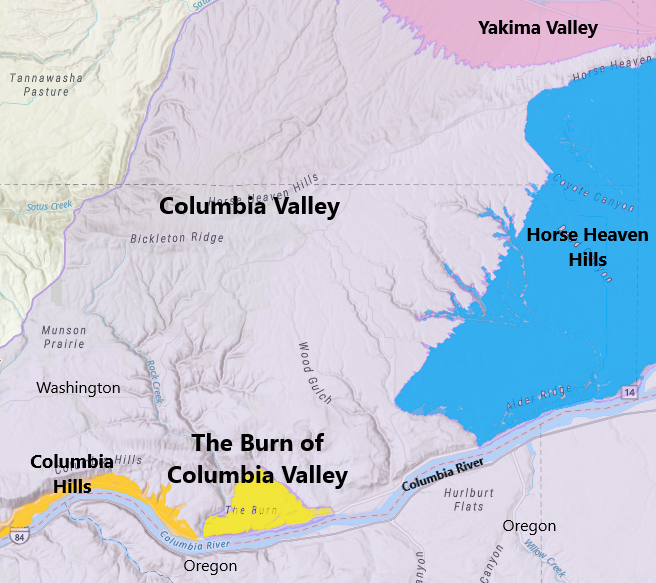
- Type: American Viticultural Area
- Year established: 2021
- Years of wine industry: 24
- Country: United States
- Part of: Washington, Klickitat County, Columbia Valley AVA
- Other regions in Washington, Klickitat County, Columbia Valley AVA: Columbia Gorge AVA, Columbia Hills AVA, Horse Heaven Hills AVA
- Growing season: 202 days
- Climate region: Region III
- Heat units: 3,306 GDD units
- Precipitation (annual average): 8.78 inches (223.01 mm)
- Soil conditions: Walla Walla silt loam
- Total area: 16,870 acres (26 sq mi)
- Size of planted vineyards: 1,500 acres (607 ha)
- No. of vineyards: 3
- Grapes produced: Cabernet Sauvignon, Chardonnay, Malbec, Sangiovese, Syrah

The Burn of Columbia Valley is an American Viticultural Area (AVA) located within Klickitat County in south-central Washington on the north banks of the Columbia River along the Oregon state border. It was established as the nation's 255^{th} and the state's eighteenth appellation on June 17, 2021 by the Alcohol and Tobacco Tax and Trade Bureau (TTB), Treasury after reviewing a petition received from Kevin Corliss, Vice President of Vineyards for Ste. Michelle Wine Estates, Joan R. Davenport, Professor of Soil Sciences at Washington State University, and John Derrick, Vice President of Operations for Mercer Ranches, Inc., proposing the viticultural area named "The Burn of Columbia Valley" The appellation, known colloquially as "The Burn," encompasses about 16,870 acres (26 sq mi) where three commercial vineyards cultivate approximately 1,261 acres (510 ha) as many Washington wineries source grapes from here. The Burn lies entirely within the vast Columbia Valley appellation and stands alone between the Columbia Gorge and the Horse Heaven Hills viticultural areas. The distinguishing features of The Burn of Columbia Valley are its soils, climate, and topography.

== Name Evidence ==
There is no exact consensus on where the name "The Burn" originated, although it has been used in reference to the area for generations. "The Burn" may refer to a local legend where early settlers set clearing fires to the benchland every Fall and rejuvenate the native springtime grasses for their horses. "The name "The Burn" not only has a bit of legend behind it, but also historical name evidence," said petitioner Kevin Corliss. "For example, in the early 1900s, mail was delivered from the SP&S Railway station in Sundale, Washington, to this area with the designation "The Burn." Additionally, the USGS online map continues to call this area "The Burn." It may also be based on the Gaelic, German, and English-inspired use of the term "burn", as in "Bannockburn" or "born," as in "Padderborn" or "bourne," as in "Melbourne" to refer to a stream or a river, respectively.

== Terroir ==
=== Topography ===
The topography of The Burn of Columbia Valley AVA consists of gently sloping bench lands above the Columbia River. Elevations in the appellation range from 270 to 1,780 feet (82–543 m) above sea level. The average slope angle within the AVA is 7.27 percent, which is suitable for mechanical cultivation of vineyards, yet is steep enough to avoid the pooling of cold air that could damage grapes. The AVA also has a large, contiguous expanse of land with easterly and southern aspects, as well as a southeasterly aspect, which allows excellent sunlight exposure for vineyards.

=== Soil ===
The soils of The Burn are primarily silty loams in the taxonomic order Mollisols. Soils are described as having good plant-available water holding capacity that are capable of delivering sufficient water to the vines during the growing season. The soils are also relatively high in organic material and provide adequate nutrients, particularly nitrogen, to the vines. The most common soil series and complexes in the AVA are Walla Walla silt loam (without cemented substratum), Rock outcrop–Haploxeroll complex, Haploxeroll–Fluvaquent complex, Fluventic Haploxeroll–Riverwash complex, Rock outcrop Rubble and Complex, Wato silt loam, Walla Walla silt loam (with cemented substratum), Endicott silt loam, and Endicott–Moxee complex. In the region to the south of The Burn, the soils contain series and complexes also not present within the AVA, including Ritzville silt loam, Willis silt loam, and Roloff–Rock outcrop complex.

=== Climate ===
The climate within The Burn AVA is characterized by an average annual growing degree day 1 (GDD) accumulation of 2,763 GDDs, with a minimum of 2,405 GDDs and a maximum of 3,249 GDDs. Average annual GDD accumulations to the east-northeast and northwest of the AVA are lower, and average annual rainfall amounts are higher than within the area. The average annual GDD accumulations favor the production of grape varietals with higher heat unit requirements, such as Cabernet Sauvignon and Syrah, which are the two most commonly grown grape varietals in the AVA. The Burn receives an average of 8.76 inches of precipitation annually, with a minimum of 6.65 inches and a maximum of 10.44 inches. Low annual rainfall amounts mean that vineyards will require supplemental irrigation. The USDA plant hardiness zone is 7b.

=== Wind ===
In neighboring Horse Heaven Hills viticultural area, its petition specified as a significant distinguishing feature the persistent strong winds the area receives. Based on the proximity to the Columbia River, with the Columbia Gorge acting as a funnel, both Horse Heaven Hills and The Burn AVAs receive significantly more wind than surrounding areas. In the article titled "The Columbia Gorge Wind Funnel" from the August 1953 issue (pp. 104–107) of Weatherwise magazine, Howard E. Graham of the National Weather Service's Portland, Oregon, office, explains the Columbia Gorge wind patterns are a function of the pressure differences between the west and east ends of the 120 miles (193 km) long river canyon. The Gorge surrounds the Columbia River between Bridal Veil, Oregon, in the west, and Arlington, Washington, in the east. The article emphasizes that the persistent winds, rarely calm, always flow along the axis of the Gorge. The Pacific winds from the west bring moderating, mild maritime air into the Gorge. Conversely, the continental high winds from the east bring in dry air that is seasonably hot or cold. The heat of the Columbia Basin draws these intense winds north over The Burn and Horse Heaven Hills after they exit the Columbia Gorge. Wind through the Columbia Gorge is determined by Wind Run Miles (WRMs), a unit of measure for the force and speed of wind in one hour. The Horse Heaven Hills viticultural area records an average of 30 percent more WRMs than the Walla Walla Valley AVA to the east and the Yakima Valley AVA to the north, and 20 percent more than the Red Mountain AVA to the immediate north. These three surrounding viticultural areas, unlike the Horse Heaven Hills region, are not in the direct wind funnel path of the Columbia Gorge.

Viticultural area	Annual wind run miles (WRMs)
Horse Heaven Hills	46,200
Red Mountain	36,700
Walla Walla Valley	32,800
Yakima Valley	32,800

The wind's effect on viticulture is especially noted during the grapevine bud-break to fruit-set period, according to a 1982 article, "Influence of Windbreaks and Climatic Region on Diurnal Fluctuation of Leaf Water Potential, Stomatal Conductance, and Leaf Temperature of Grapevines" by Freeman, Kliewer, and Stern in the American Journal of Enological Viticulture (vol. 33, pp.233–236). The most-often observed consequences of the higher winds within the affected AVAs include a reduction in canopy size and density of grapes on the vines. Also, vines are less prone to disease, based on the wind's drying of wet plant surfaces on where fungal spores or bacteria can land. The volume of wind is also a key factor in determining the amount of irrigation needed for optimum vine growth.
