= Alcohol and Tobacco Tax and Trade Bureau =

Bureau of the United States Department of the Treasury

Agency overview
- Formed: January 24, 2003
- Preceding agency: Bureau of Alcohol, Tobacco, and Firearms
- Headquarters: 1310 G Street NW; Washington, D.C.
- Employees: 531 (2006)
- Agency executive: Mary G. Ryan, Administrator
- Parent agency: Department of the Treasury
- Website: ttb.gov

The Alcohol and Tobacco Tax and Trade Bureau, statutorily named the Tax and Trade Bureau (TTB), is a bureau of the United States Department of the Treasury, which regulates and collects taxes on trade and imports of alcohol, tobacco, and firearms within the United States.

== Overview ==
TTB was created on January 24, 2003, when the Homeland Security Act of 2002 split the Bureau of Alcohol, Tobacco and Firearms (ATF) into two new organizations with separate functions. Specifically, the Act transferred ATF and its law enforcement functions from the Department of the Treasury to the Department of Justice. ATF's other functions, dealing with tax collection and regulation of legitimate trade, remained within the Treasury Department and became part of the new TTB.

== Organization ==
TTB's Field Operations are organized into five divisions:

1. National Revenue Center: reconciles returns, reports, and claims; screens applications and promptly issues permits; and provides expert technical assistance for industry, the public and government agencies to ensure fair and proper revenue collection and public safety.
2. Risk Management: develops, implements, and maintains monitoring programs for collecting the revenue due the Federal Government and protecting the public, and ensures resources are effectively used.
3. Tax Audit: verifies the proper payment of alcohol, tobacco, firearms and ammunition excise taxes and ensures compliance with laws and regulations by taxpayers in a manner that protects the revenue, protects the consumer, and promotes voluntary compliance.
4. Trade Investigations: comprises investigators who ensure industry compliance with the laws and regulations administered by the TTB.
5. Tobacco Enforcement Division: protects the revenue and promotes voluntary compliance by monitoring the domestic tobacco trade, ensuring only qualified applicants enter the tobacco trade, ensuring compliance with the tax laws relating to tobacco, and facilitating TTB's enforcement functions in cases of non-compliance.

The Advertising, Labeling, and Formulation Division (ALFD) implements and enforces a broad range of statutory and compliance provisions of the Internal Revenue Code and the Federal Alcohol Administration Act. This act requires importers and bottlers of beverage alcohol to obtain certificates of label approval or certificates of exemption from label approval (COLAs) for most alcohol beverages prior to their introduction into interstate commerce. ALFD acts on these COLAs to ensure that products are labeled in accordance with federal laws and regulations. ALFD also examines formulas for wine and distilled spirits, statements of process, and pre-import applications filed by importers and proprietors of domestic distilleries, wineries, and breweries for proper tax classification and to ensure that the products are manufactured in accordance with federal laws and regulations.

== See also ==
- Title 27 of the Code of Federal Regulations
- American Viticultural Area
- Alcohol advertising
- Tobacco advertising
- Tobacco taxation
  - Cigarette taxes in the United States
