= Puget Sound AVA =

Viticultural area in Washington, USA

Coordinates: 48°32′28″N 122°54′02″W

Puget Sound
- Wine region
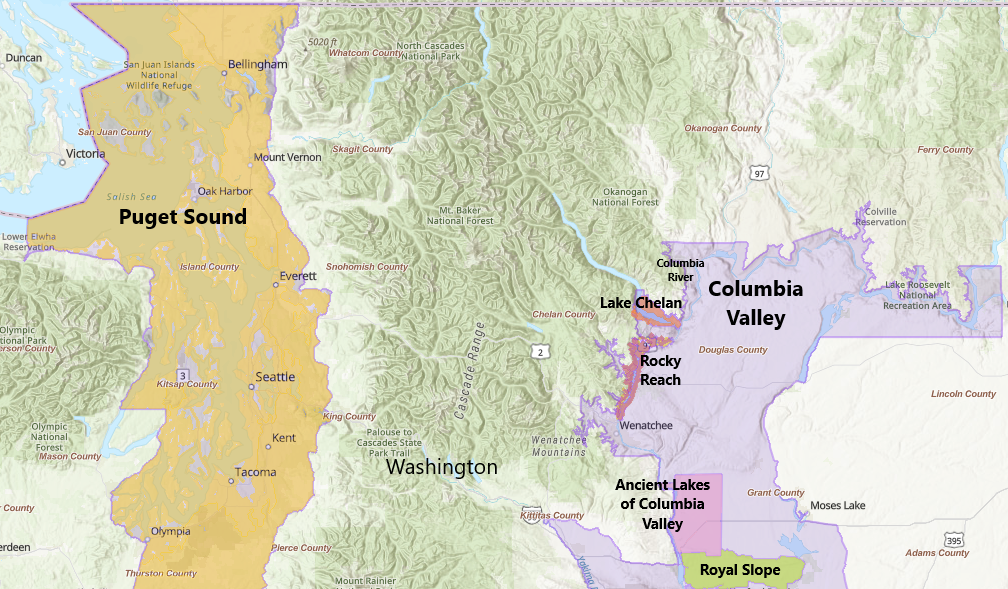
- Type: American Viticultural Area
- Year established: 1995
- Country: United States
- Part of: Washington
- Other regions in Washington: Beverly, Washington AVA, Columbia Gorge AVA, Columbia Hills AVA, Columbia Valley AVA, Ancient Lakes of Columbia Valley AVA, Candy Mountain AVA, Goose Gap AVA, Horse Heaven Hills AVA, Lake Chelan AVA, Naches Heights AVA, Rattlesnake Hills AVA, Red Mountain AVA, Rocky Reach AVA, Royal Slope AVA, Snipes Mountain AVA, The Burn of Columbia Valley AVA, Wahluke Slope AVA, Walla Walla Valley AVA, White Bluffs AVA, Yakima Valley AVA
- Growing season: 180 days
- Climate region: Region I
- Heat units: 1,300–2,200 GDD
- Precipitation (annual average): 17 to 60 inches (432–1,524 mm)
- Soil conditions: Silty to sandy topsoils over semi-permeable cemented subsoil
- Total area: 8,650 sq mi (5,536,000 acres); Land: 7,150 sq mi (4,576,000 acres); Water: 1,500 sq mi (3,885 km^{2})
- Size of planted vineyards: 80 acres (32 ha)
- No. of vineyards: 13
- Grapes produced: Chasselas, Dornfelder, Garanoir, Madeleine Angevine, Madeleine Sylvaner, Müller-Thurgau, Pinot gris, Pinot noir, Regent, Siegerrebe, St. Laurent, Syrah, Zweigelt
- No. of wineries: 125
- Wine produced: Varietal, Sparkling wine, Dessert wine

Puget Sound is an American Viticultural Area (AVA) in northwestern Washington state encompassing Clallam, Island, Jefferson, King, Kitsap, Mason, Pierce, San Juan, Skagit, Snohomish, Thurston and Whatcom counties. Puget Sound (or the "Sound") is an inlet of the Pacific Ocean extending about 190 miles (306 km) south from Admiralty Inlet and Juan de Fuca Strait to Olympia. It contains 13,100 sq mi (8,384,000 acres) of land, 150 sq mi (388 km^{2}) of fresh water, and 2,500 sq mi (6,475 km^{2}) of saltwater.

The viticultural area was established as the nation's 128^{th} and the state's fourth wine appellation on October 4, 1995 by the Bureau of Alcohol, Tobacco and Firearms (ATF), Treasury after reviewing a petition submitted by Gerard and Jo Ann Bentryn of Bainbridge Island Vineyards & Winery in Bainbridge Island, Washington, proposing the viticultural area within the State of Washington to be known as "Puget Sound."

The Puget Sound viticultural area lies entirely within the basin landform surrounding the Sound containing approximately 55% of the watershed's land area and water or 7,150 sq mi (4,576,000 acres) of land and 1,500 sq mi (3,885 km^{2}) of water for a total area of 8,650 sq mi (5,536,000 acres). It has a maximum length of 190 mi (306 km) from north to south and 60 mi (97 km) from east to west, although it is most often less than 45 mi (72 km) wide. It is the only AVA in the state located west of the Cascade Mountains.

== History ==
The name "Puget Sound" was established in 1791 by Captain George Vancouver when he named, explored, and mapped the area while in service to the British Admiralty. His maps and those of subsequent explorers, settlers and government agencies show the Puget Sound area with the countryside drained by rivers flowing into Puget Sound. Numerous references exist indicating the general use of the name "Puget Sound" to refer to the area. The petitioners included copies of title pages of various publications, guide and tour book references, public telephone book listings, and Federal and State agency maps, to illustrate the use of the name. They also submitted an excerpt from, "Touring the Washington Wine Country," 1993, published by the Washington Wine Commission. This publication discusses grape growing in western Washington and states that, "the expansive Puget Sound basin offers a temperate climate that rarely suffers from prolonged freezing weather in the winter and quite often enjoys a long and warm summer growing season."

One of the earliest recorded plantings in the Puget Sound area was in 1872 by a Civil War veteran named Lambert Evans on Stretch Island, near modern-day Allyn-Grapeview. Evans planted apples and several varieties of "Vitis labrusca," an eastern North American native grape species suitable in the wet Puget Sound climate. In 1889, Aaron Eckert immigrated to Stretch Island from New York State and established a vineyard with grapes called "Island Belle." This variety is currently known as Campbell Early, which combines Vitis vinifera and Vitis labrusca vines. Island Belle was widely planted as a table and juice grape until Prohibition when it became used for home winemaking. There are a few of these "Island Belle" vines surviving and Hoodsport Winery has produced a wine from them with that name for decades.

Bainbridge Island Vineyard and Winery was established in 1977 and its founder Gerard Bentryn is credited with being the first to establish the aromatic German Siegerrebe grapes in the United States. Bentryn authored the ATF petition to propose Puget Sound as the fourth AVA established in Washington State in 1995. Bentryn is also credited being instrumental in bringing many of the cool climate varietals in common use today; he worked with Dr. Norton at Washington State University and had them imported from Saanich Farm Experimental Station in Canada, Geisenheim Grape Breeding Institute in Germany.

== Terroir ==
=== Topography ===
The Puget Sound basin is a large lowland surrounding bodies of salt water called in government reports Puget Sound or "Puget Sound and Adjacent Waters." These waters comprise Puget Sound, a long, wide ocean inlet. The basin is cut by many rivers flowing into the Sound. Low rolling hills formed by the deposit and erosion of advancing and retreating glaciers are cut by ravines and stream channels. The dominating natural features are the sound itself and the surrounding mountains. The Olympic Mountains form the western boundary of the Puget Sound basin. These mountains intercept moist maritime Pacific air and account for the relatively low annual precipitation. The Cascade Mountain range forms the eastern boundary of the Puget Sound basin. These mountains protect the basin from the extremely cold winters and hot summers of eastern Washington. Elevations in the basin are primarily between sea-level and 1,000 feet (305 m). Isolated hills of up to 4,000 feet (1,219 m) occur primarily in the northeast but none of the existing vineyards is above 600 feet (183 m) in elevation.

=== Climate ===
The climate of Puget Sound is well differentiated from that of surrounding areas. The Olympic Mountains to the west and the Cascade Mountains to the east protect the region from the cool wet influence of the Pacific Ocean and the extreme summer and winter temperatures of eastern Washington. The Strait of Juan de Fuca and associated waterways separate Puget Sound from the cooler summer areas to the north. Foothills to the south of the Puget Sound viticultural area are the limit of the area influenced by the moderating effect of the waters of the Sound. Both summer and winter temperatures are significantly cooler in the hills and mountains to the west, south, and east. The western, eastern and southern boundaries of the Puget Sound viticultural area closely follow the line formed by a growing season of 180 days and the 60 in (1,524 mm) of annual precipitation. All areas within the viticultural area below 600 feet (183 m) in elevation have a 180-day or longer growing season with 60 inches (1,524 mm) or less of annual rainfall, and 15 inches (381 mm) or less of rainfall in the months of April to October (inclusive). Areas outside of, but adjacent to, the viticultural area to the west, south, and east have a growing season of generally less than 180 days, with more than 60 inches (1,524 mm) of annual rainfall, and more than 15 inches (381 mm) of rainfall in the months of April to October (inclusive). Examples of weather recording stations surrounding the Puget Sound region are as follows: To the west is Forks, with a growing season of 175 days and an annual precipitation of 118 inches (2,997 mm) (38 in (965 mm) April to October). To the southeast is Paradise Ranger Station (Mount Rainier National Park), with a growing season of 50 days and an annual precipitation of 106 inches (2,692 mm) (39 inches (991 mm) April to October). To the east is Diablo Dam with a growing season of 170 days and an annual precipitation of 72 inches (1,829 mm) (23 inches (584 mm)from April to October). To the northeast is Heather Meadows Recreational Area (Mt. Baker National Forest) with a growing season of 150 days and an annual precipitation of 110 inches (2,794 mm) (44 inches (1,118 mm) from April to October). The northerly border of the viticultural area closely conforms to the temperature boundary of areas experiencing a mean high temperature in the warmest month (July) of 72 °F (22 °C) or greater. Cool air from the Pacific Ocean moves east through the Strait of Juan de Fuca during the growing season limiting the reliable ripening of winegrapes in the areas west of the Elwha River and outside the line formed by the western boundaries of Clallam, San Juan, and Whatcom Counties and the northern boundary of Whatcom County. Examples of areas to the northwest of the viticultural area with mean high temperatures in the warmest month which are lower than 72 °F (22 °C) are: Forks, Washington, 71 °F (22 °C); Clallam Bay, Washington, 67 °F (19 °C); Victoria, British Columbia, 68 °F (20 °C); and Sidney, British Columbia, 67 °F (19 °C). The USDA plant hardiness zones range from 8a to 9b.

=== Degree Days ===
Total degree days as measured by the scale, developed by Winkler and Amerine of the University of California, Davis, range between 1300 at the northern border, to 2200 in the south. Typical readings are: Friday Harbor 1380, Blaine 1480, Sequim 1310, Port Townsend 1480, Mt. Vernon 1530, Coupeville 1360, Monroe 1820, Bothell 1520, Kent 1940, Seattle (U of W) 2160, Bremerton 1810, Vashon 1730, Grapeview 2010, Puyallup 1770, Tacoma 1940, and Olympia 2160. There is a significant temperature variation from north to south. According to the petitioner, this temperature variation is within a range that will allow the same types of grapes to be grown throughout the area.

=== Rainfall ===
Rainfall in the Puget Sound viticultural area is substantially less than in surrounding areas. It ranges from 17 in (432 mm) annually in the north to 60 in (1,524 mm) in the south. Typical amounts are: Friday Harbor 28", Blaine 34", Sequim 17", Port Townsend 18", Mt. Vernon 32", Coupeville 18", Monroe 47", Bothell 40", Kent 38", Seattle (U of W) 35", Bremerton 39", Vashon 47", Grapeview 53", Puyallup 41", Tacoma 37", and Olympia 52". Growing season rainfall ranges from 8 in (203 mm) inches in the north to 15 in (381 mm) in the south. Outside of the boundaries, the rainfall ranges from 17 to 220 in (432–5,588 mm). Overall, the Puget Sound viticultural area can be characterized as having a growing season of over 180 days, annual degree day averages between 1300 and 2200, and annual rainfall of 60 inches or less. Rainfall ranges in the AVA is similar to many European grape growing areas and the Willamette Valley AVA in Oregon. Most of that rainfall occurs in the winter time. Summers are mild, sunny and dry where irrigation is a necessity in some of the locations.

=== Soils ===
Soils in the Puget Sound viticultural area are completely unlike those of the surrounding upland areas in that they are the result of the advance and withdrawal of the Vashon Glaciation. This most recent glaciation (10,000 years ago) coincided at its limits with the eastern, southern, and southwestern boundaries of the viticultural area. The resultant soils are primarily silty to sandy topsoils with scattered small to moderate rounded stones. This is typical of post glacial soils in lowland areas. Areas outside the viticultural area to the west, south and east, were not covered by ice during the Vashon Glaciation. Consequently, soils in surrounding areas have entirely different origins and genesis. The primary impact on viticultural conditions by the glaciation of the Puget Sound viticultural area was the development of a semi-permeable cemented subsoil at depths generally from {{convert|1|to(-)|10|ft|0|}. This subsoil was created by the pressure of 1,000 to 3,000 feet (305–914 m) of overlying ice. The subsoil acts as a storage vehicle for winter rains and allows deep rooted vines to survive the late-summer soil water deficit without irrigation. The surrounding areas which were not glaciated do not share this comparative advantage. The semi-permeable cemented subsoil is the most significant soil factor relative to viticulture in the area.

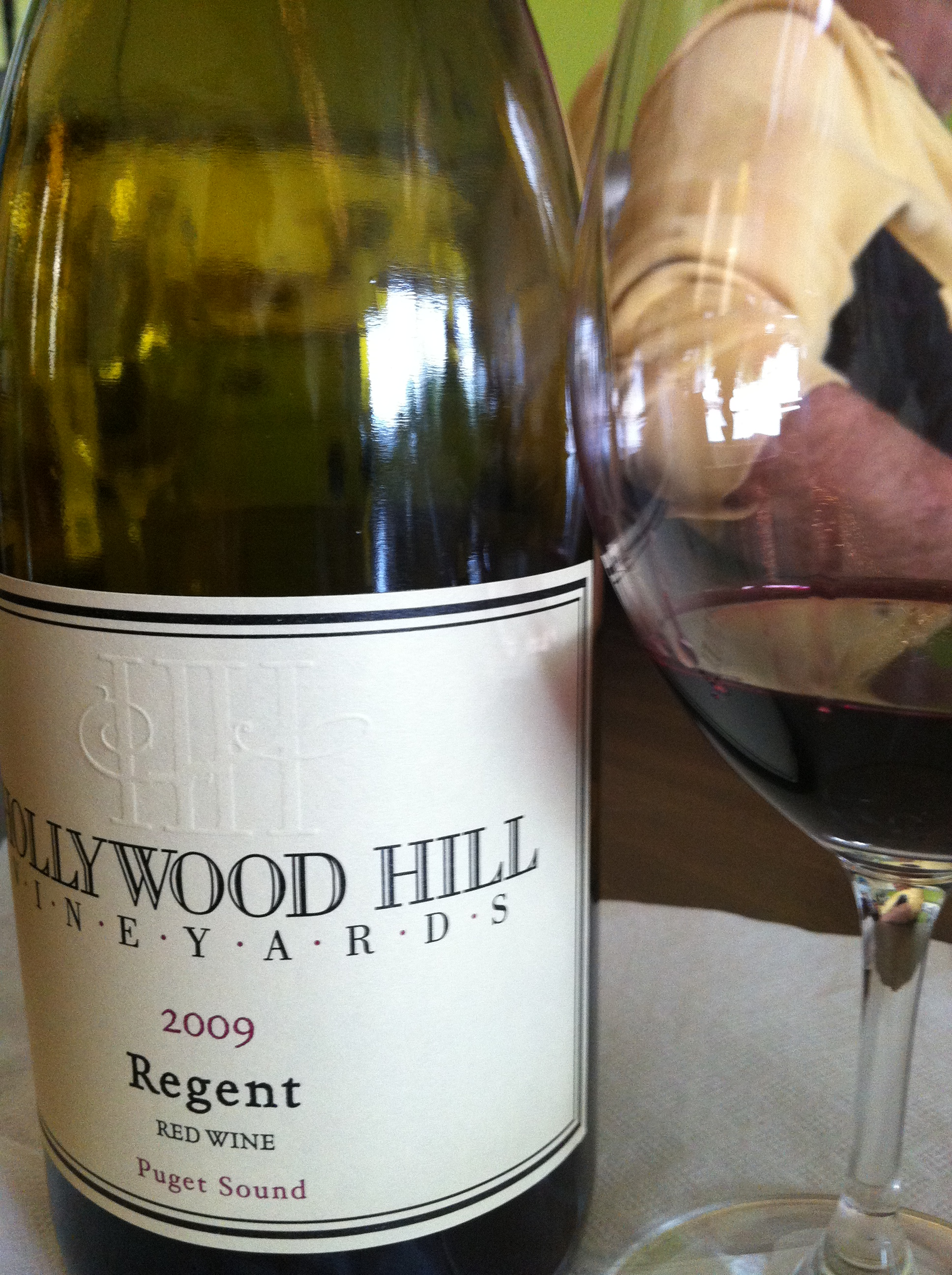
Regent Red Wine with the Puget Sound label.

== Viticulture ==
The petition stated that neither vinifera nor labrusca vines are native to the area; however, they are now grown throughout the basin. In 1872, Lambert Evans established a vineyard on Stretch Island in southern Puget Sound. He sold the fruit in Seattle. In the 1890s a viticulturalist from the East Coast named Adam Eckert brought new grape varieties and planted more vineyards on the island. The first bonded winery in Washington State was established there in 1933 by Charles Somers. Known as the St. Charles Winery, it reached a capacity of 100,000 US gallons (378,541 L). Viticulture spread throughout the Puget Sound basin as evidenced by the annual reports of the Washington State Department of Agriculture. These primarily labrusca plantings were gradually supplanted in most of the basin by vinifera plantings from the 1950s to the present. The Washington State Department of Agriculture 1960 report entitled, "Washington Agriculture," cited two small areas of grape cultivation outside of Yakima Valley; one of them being "in western Washington in Kitsap county. There along the shores of Puget Sound, grapes have grown satisfactorily for many years." The 1993 publication, "Touring the Washington Wine Country," by the Washington Wine Commission stated that, "Small vineyards flourish on Puget Sound's islands." There are now over 100 acres (40 ha) of vineyards in the basin and 25 bonded wineries. Although the Puget Sound AVA contains over 100 wineries, most source grapes from vineyards in eastern Washington. As of 2021, there are about 20 wineries producing wines from Puget Sound grapes and are distinctly labeled.

The AVA is suited to cool climate varieties such as Madeleine Angevine, Madeline Sylvaner, Müller-Thurgau and Siegerrebe with some clonal varieties of Pinot noir and Pinot gris, Chardonnay and Melon de Bourgogne growing well in warmer locations. Many new varieties showed promise during tests at the Washington State University Mount Vernon Agricultural Research Station in 2005. Those include Regent, St. Laurent, Zweigelt, Dornfelder and Garanoir. In 2019, several of these varieties were showing up in Puget Sound tasting rooms.
