= Washington wine =

Wine produced from grape varieties grown in the U.S. state of Washington

Washington
- Wine region
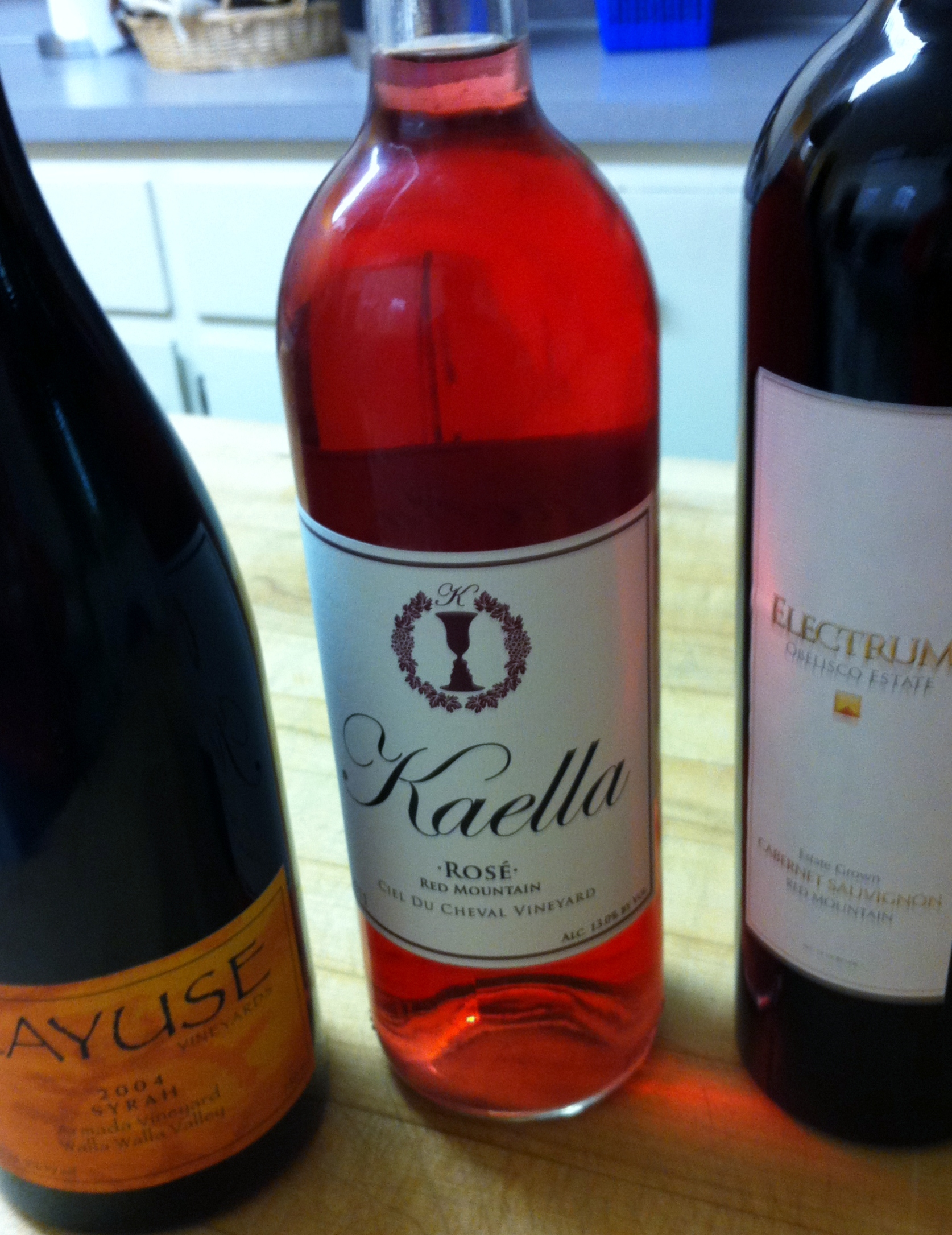
- An assortment of Washington wines from Walla Walla and Red Mountain AVAs
- Official name: State of Washington
- Type: U.S. State Appellation
- Year established: 1889
- Years of wine industry: 155
- Country: United States
- Other regions in vicinity: Oregon, Idaho
- Sub-regions: Ancient Lakes of the Columbia Valley AVA, Beverly, Washington AVA, Candy Mountain AVA, Columbia Gorge AVA, Columbia Hills AVA, Columbia Valley AVA, Goose Gap AVA, Lake Chelan AVA, Horse Heaven Hills AVA, Naches Heights AVA, Lewis-Clark Valley AVA, Puget Sound AVA, Rattlesnake Hills AVA, Red Mountain AVA, Rocky Reach AVA, Royal Slope AVA, Snipes Mountain AVA, The Burn of Columbia Valley AVA, Wahluke Slope AVA, Walla Walla Valley AVA, White Bluffs AVA, Yakima Valley AVA
- Total area: 42.5 million acres (66,456 sq mi)
- Size of planted vineyards: 31,000 acres (12,545 ha)
- Grapes produced: Aligoté, Cabernet Franc, Cabernet Sauvignon, Carménère, Chardonnay, Chenin blanc, Gewürztraminer, Grenache, Lemberger, Léon Millot, Madeleine Angevine, Madeleine Sylvaner, Malbec, Marechal Foch, Merlot, Müller-Thurgau, Muscat Canelli, Muscat Ottonel, Petit Verdot, Pinot blanc, Pinot gris, Pinot noir, Riesling, Roussanne, Sangiovese, Sauvignon blanc, Sémillon, Siegerrebe, Syrah, Viognier, Zinfandel
- Wine produced: 25.7 million US gallons (97 million litres) (2024)

Washington wine refers to wine produced from grape varieties grown in the U.S. state appellation of Washington. State names in the United States automatically qualify as legal appellations of origin for wine produced from grapes grown in that state and do not require registration with the Alcohol and Tobacco Tax and Trade Bureau (TTB) of the Treasury Department. TTB was created in January 2003, when the Bureau of Alcohol, Tobacco and Firearms, or ATF, was extensively reorganized under the provisions of the Homeland Security Act of 2002.

Washington ranks third nationally in the production of wine, behind California and New York. By 2017, the state had over 55 thousand acres (86 square miles) of vineyards, a harvest of 229 thousand short tons (208 thousand tonnes) of grapes, and exports going to over 40 countries around the world from the 940+ wineries located in the state. While there are some viticultural activities in the cooler, wetter western half of the state, the majority (99.9%) of wine grape production takes place in the shrub-steppe eastern half. The rain shadow of the Cascade Range leaves the Columbia River Basin with around eight inches (200 mm) of annual rainfall, making irrigation and water rights of paramount interest to the Washington wine industry. Viticulture in the state is also influenced by long sunlight hours (on average, two more hours a day than in California during the growing season) and consistent temperatures.

The early history of the Washington wine industry can be traced to the introduction of Cinsault grapes by Italian immigrants to the Walla Walla region. Grapes are not indigenous to the Columbia Valley viticultural area, but both Vinifera and Labruscavines are grown. The oldest planted Vinifera vines still in existence were planted by German immigrants in the Tampico vicinity, west of Union Gap, in 1871. Others were planted in the Kennewick area in 1895, and in the Walla Walla area by 1899. Planting of premium Vinifera grapes began in the Columbia Valley in the mid-1960s. By 1981 there were over 6,610 acres (2,675 ha) of Vinifera grapes including 2,700 acres (1,093 ha) of cultivated vineyards. In the 1950s and 1960s, the precursors of the state's biggest wineries (Chateau Ste. Michelle and Columbia Winery) were founded. Throughout the rest of the 20th century, the wine world discovered a new aspect of Washington wines with each passing decade – starting with Rieslings and Chardonnays in the 1970s, the Merlot craze of the 1980s and the emergence of Cabernet Sauvignon and Syrah in the 1990s. Washington has twenty federally defined American Viticultural Areas (AVA) with all but one located in Eastern Washington. The largest is the Columbia Valley AVA, which extends into a small portion of northern Oregon and encompasses most of the states's AVAs. They are Lewis-Clark Valley AVA, the Ancient Lakes AVA, Walla Walla Valley AVA, which encompasses Oregon's The Rocks District of Milton-Freewater AVA, Horse Heaven Hills AVA, the Wahluke Slope AVA, Lake Chelan AVA, Naches Heights AVA, and the Yakima Valley AVA, which in turn also encompasses the Rattlesnake Hills AVA, Snipes Mountain AVA, the Red Mountain AVA, Goose Gap AVA and the Candy Mountain AVA. The Columbia Gorge AVA is west of the Columbia Valley AVA. As of 2023, Washington's only AVA located west of the Cascades is the Puget Sound AVA and a petition has been submitted to Alcohol and Tobacco Tax and Trade Bureau (TTB) proposing a new American Viticultural Area named "Mount St. Helens" covering parts of Clark County, Cowlitz County, Skamania County and Lewis County.

== History ==
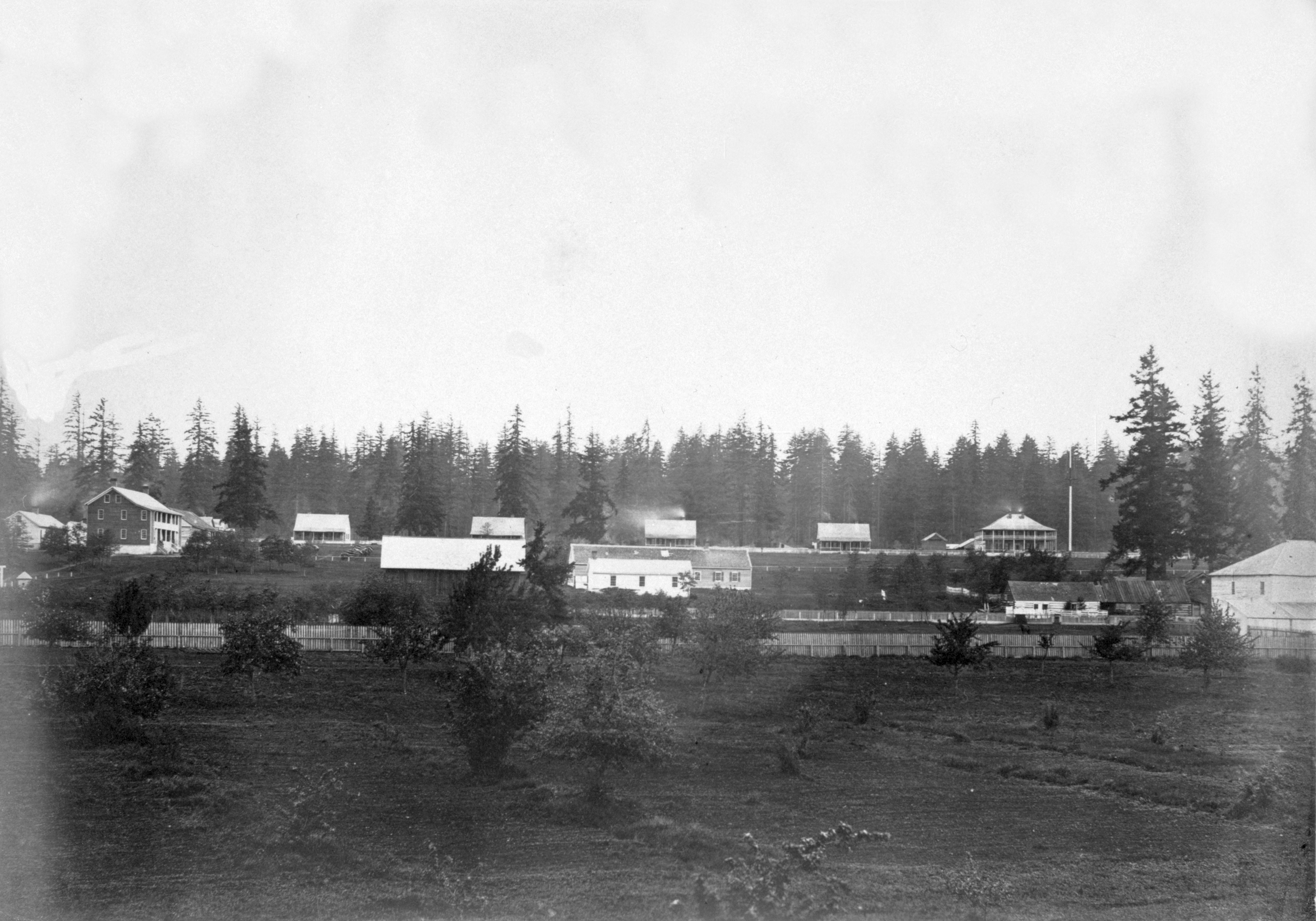
Fort Vancouver in 1859

The earliest grape vines planted in Washington State were at Fort Vancouver in 1825 by traders working for the Hudson's Bay Company but it is not known for sure whether the wine was ever produced from these plantings. Currently, a number of wineries and vineyards operate in the region near Fort Vancouver in Clark County, Cowlitz County, and parts of Skamania County and Lewis County. The first people who were definitely known to produce wine were German and Italian immigrants who planted their wine grapes in Washington during the 1860s and 1870s. Washington was one of the first states to usher in the start of Prohibition, going dry in 1917 and shutting down most of the state's wine production. Some scattered grape growers stayed afloat during this period selling grapes to home winemakers but nearly all the state's commercial wines went out of business. Following the end of Prohibition, Washington's fledgling wine industry was based primarily on fortified sweet wine production made from the Vitis labrusca variety Concord. The Nawico and Pommerelle wineries were the most widely recognized producers, making millions of gallons each year of sweet jug wine made from Concord and other varieties. In the 1950s, the planting of Vitis vinifera saw an increase spearheaded, in part, by the work of Dr. Walter Clore and Washington State University which conducted a series of trials on which grape vines could produce the best wine in various soils and climates of Washington.

The roots of the modern Washington wine industry can be traced to the middle of the 20th century when a group of professors from the University of Washington turned their home winemaking operation into a commercial endeavor and founded Associated Vintners (later renamed Columbia Winery) and focused on producing premium wines. The Nawico and Pommerelle wineries were merged into a new winery that would eventually become Chateau Ste Michelle. With the hiring of André Tchelistcheff as a consultant, Chateau Ste Michelle and Associated Vintners became the driving force in premium wine production for the early modern Washington wine industry. Grenache was one of the first Vitis vinifera grapes to be successfully vinified with a 1966 Yakima Valley rosé earning mention in wine historian Leon Adams's treatise The Wines of America. The 1970s ushered in a period of expansion, with early vineyards being planted in the Columbia Gorge, Walla Walla and Red Mountain areas. The 1978 Leonetti Cellars Cabernet Sauvignon was featured on the cover of a national wine publication and touted as the best Cabernet of vintage. The 1980s saw further expansion with the opening of large-scale family-owned wineries such as Woodward Canyon, L'Ecole N°41, Barnard Griffin and Hogue Cellars that soon won many awards from both national and international wine competitions. In 1988, Chateau Ste Michelle was named "Best American Winery" and in 1989 five Washington wines made Wine Spectator's "Top 100 list" for the first time.

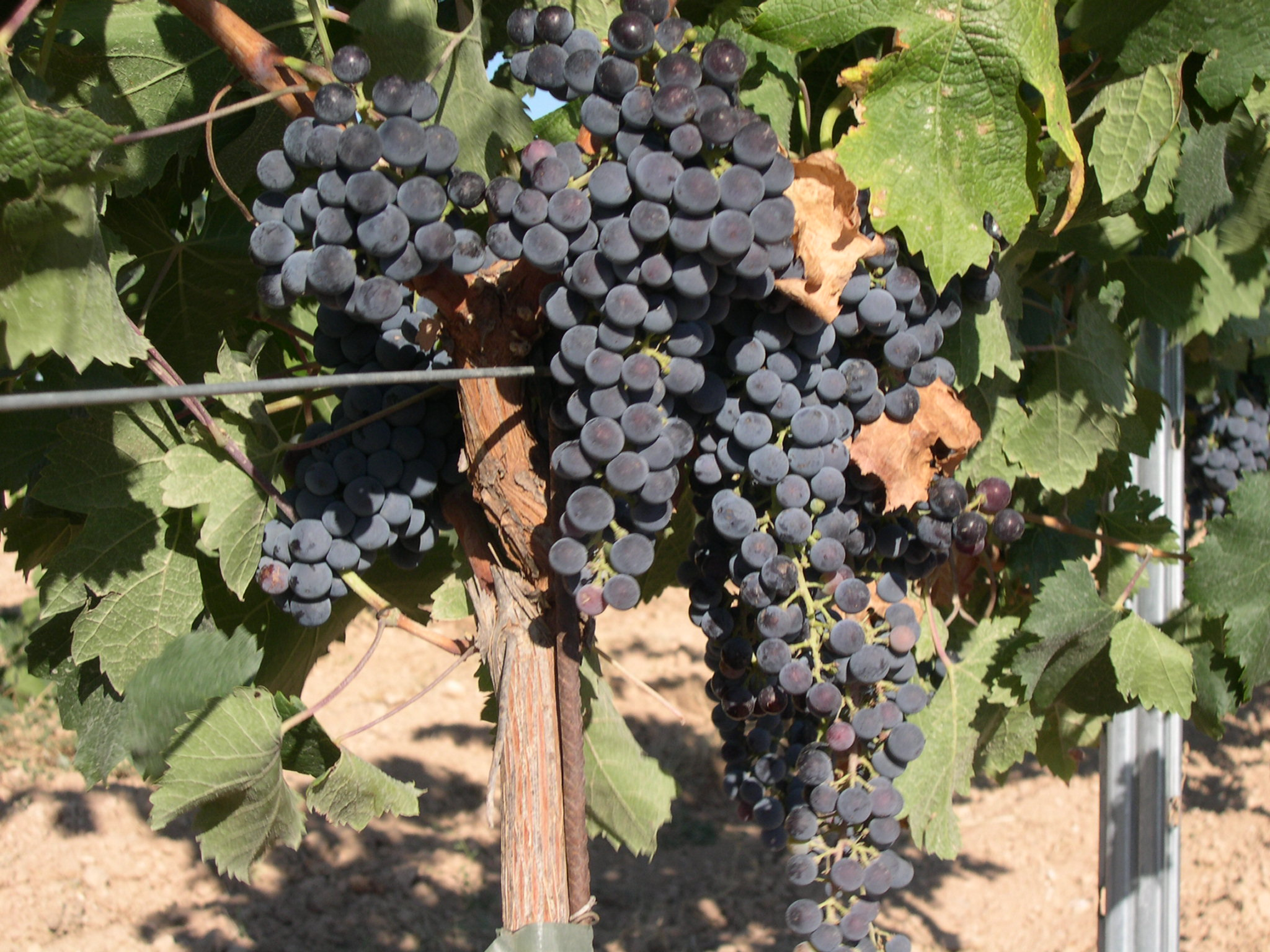
The "Merlot craze" of the 1990s prompts dramatic growth in the Washington wine industry in the late 20th century.

Following the broadcast in 1991 of the 60 Minutes episode on the so-called "French paradox", American consumption of red wine dramatically increased. The grape variety Merlot, in particular, proved to be very popular among consumers. The Washington Wine Commission made the marketing of the state's Merlot a focus, putting Washington in prime position to capitalize on the new "Merlot craze". Plantings of the varietal increased more than fivefold and Washington Merlots were featured prominently on restaurant wine lists across the country. From there producers went on to experiment with success on varieties and blends as the Washington Wine industry steadily grew. By the beginning of the 21st century, the wine industry was generating more than 2.4 billion dollars annually for the state with wine grape being the fourth most important fruit crop in the state—behind apples, pears and cherries. By 2007 the state had certified its 500th winery. In early 2009, the state's 600th winery opened.

== Geography and climate ==
The rain shadow created by the Cascade Mountains keeps the wet, marine influence of the Puget Sound and Pacific Ocean from affecting the dry, desert-like conditions of Eastern Washington.

The Cascade Mountain range is a defining feature in both the geography and climate of Washington state. It serves as a dividing line between the wet, marine-influenced climate of the western part of the state from the drier, desert-like climate of the eastern half. The mountains themselves create a rain shadow over the eastern half by blocking weather fronts holding precipitation from carrying over the mountains and descending onto the Columbia River Basin. This creates the arid desert-like conditions with a more continental climate in Eastern Washington and heightens the roles of rivers—most notably the Walla Walla, Yakima, Snake and Columbia River—in the region's viticulture. In addition to providing vital irrigation sources, the rivers also help to moderate temperatures during the winter which is prone to severe frost and freeze coming from the Arctic. In winter, overnight temperatures in the wine growing regions of Eastern Washington can drop to as low as −15 °F (−26 °C). The sudden drop to these sub-zero temperatures can make the water in a vine's wood canopy quickly freeze which can cause the vine to literally burst open. The severity of these conditions can wreak havoc on a year's harvest, as was the case in the Walla Walla AVA with the big winter freezes of 1996 and 2003.

Today the topsoil found throughout the Columbia Valley is mostly sandy and stone-studded on top of a basalt-based soil foundation created by persistent lava. These sandy loam vineyard soils create a nearly inhospitable environment for the phylloxera louse, which may be one of the reasons why the phylloxera epidemic has not ravaged the Washington wine industry as it has the Californian and French wine industries in the past. The state's northerly location above the 46th parallel north allows Washington's major wine growing regions to experience 17 hours of sunlight in the summer—two more hours of sunlight during the peak of the growing season than what California sees further south. During the growing season Eastern Washington experiences a wide diurnal temperature variation (up to 40 °F (22 °C) difference between daytime highs and nighttime lows) which allows the fruit to fully ripen while the cool nights help the vines to shut down, allowing the grape to maintain natural levels of acidity.

== Viticulture ==
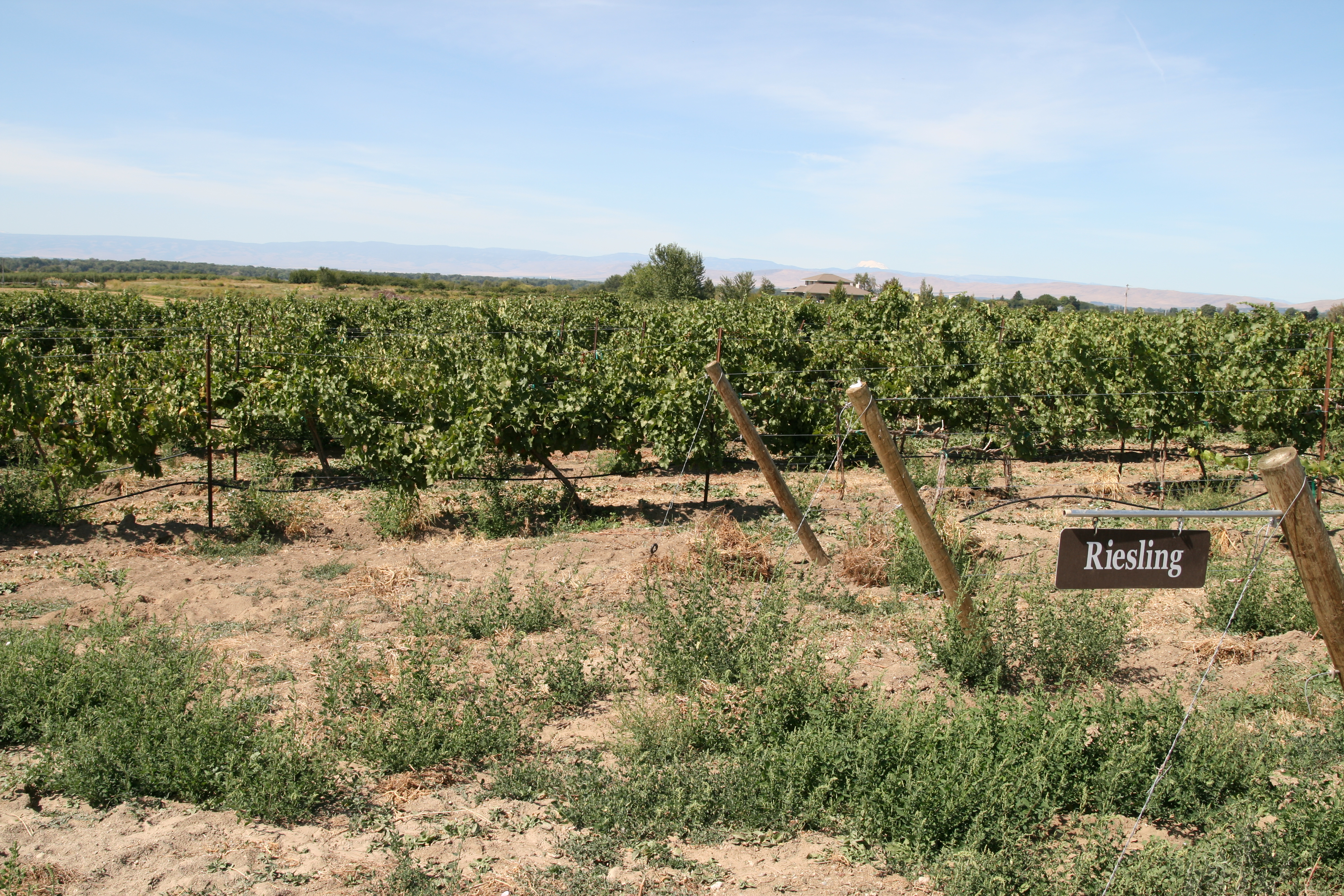
Riesling vineyard in the Rattlesnake Hills

Viticulture in Washington State is deeply influenced by the use of irrigation and the water rights associated with suitable vineyard land. Sourced from the major rivers that run through the area, most vineyards in Eastern Washington are irrigated though some vineyards (especially in the slightly wetter Walla Walla Valley near the Blue Mountains), but some have begun experimenting with dry farming. The ever-present threat of severe winter frost has influenced viticultural practices including the adoption of wind turbines to churn and circulate air in the vineyard. In the late 20th century, many producers began adapting Russian vine-training techniques for fan-training which promotes better air circulation among the vine so cold air doesn't settle on the vine. Due to the minimal risk exposure to phylloxera, some producers have opted to leave their vines ungrafted on its original rootstock since an exposed graft union is more vulnerable to frost damage. One benefit of the traditionally cold winters is that the grapevines are allowed to go into full dormancy, which allows the vines to shut down and conserve energy that will be vital at the beginning of the new growth cycle for the vine. The threat of freezing condition is the main viticultural hazard that vine growers need to concern themselves with since the lack of rainfall during the summer and autumn contribute to the dry, arid conditions that allows most of Washington vineyards to be relatively disease free.

Until recently, there has been very little clonal diversity among the grape varieties grown in Washington. This has led to some critics, such as Hugh Johnson, noting a monotone tendency in some Washington wines that limit their quality and subtlety. Along with many other New World wine regions, viticulture in Washington is highly mechanized with nearly 80% of each year's harvest being mechanically harvested. To accommodate the machine harvest, vineyard rows are widely spaced and usually trained in bilateral cordons. Harvest typically takes place from late September till the end of October.

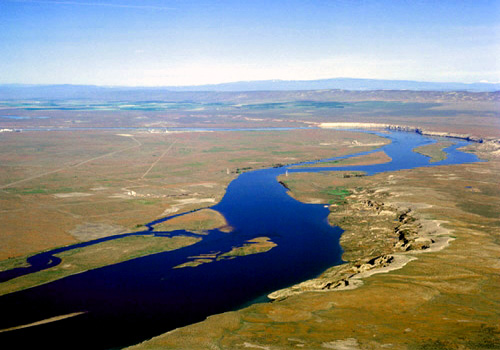
Irrigation sourced from major rivers such as the Columbia (pictured) are essential to the wine production in Washington State.

=== Irrigation ===
While the use of irrigation is disparaged or even prohibited in many premium wine producing regions, its use in Washington is absolutely vital and is a major asset in quality wine production. The average vineyard in Eastern Washington receives approximately 8 inches (200 mm) in annual rainfall, most of it during the winter months. Without irrigation, agriculture in the region would not be possible. Compared to other wine regions that do not need or practice irrigation, a vineyard manager in Washington State has more control over the potential quality of the grapes. Utilizing drip irrigation and controlling the amount of water the vines receive and wine allows the grower to limit the amount of vigor (and thus yields) of vine and leverage water stress to produce more concentrated flavors and phenolic compounds in the grape. Growers will often withhold water early in the growing season to control the leaf canopy, which can have a beneficial business aspect by saving money compared to using costly viticultural chores such as sucker pruning, leaf striping and mildew treatment to control and tend to the leaf canopy. Applying a controlled amount of water during the ripening period following veraison encourages the grapes to ripen faster without a reductive loss in quality. One additional benefit of irrigation is frost protection. Following harvest, growers will soak the soil of the vineyard to moisten the soil down to two feet. As temperatures drop, this water can form a protective layer of ice that will give the vine a few extra degrees of protection from freezing temperature that may damage the roots.

== Wine regions ==
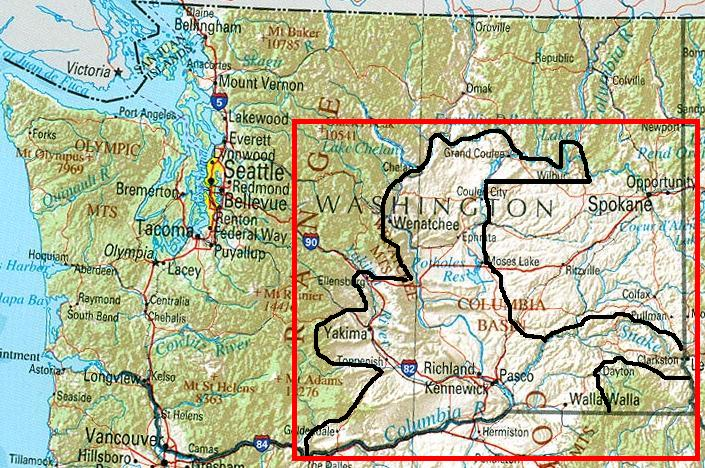
The Columbia Valley AVA covers more than a third of the state and contains several smaller AVAs within its boundaries.

Geographically and viticulturally, Washington is divided into sections separated by the Cascade Mountain chain. The cooler, wetter Western Washington which includes the population centers of Seattle, Tacoma and Olympia is responsible for less than 1% of the state's wine production and is home-to Puget Sound AVA. However, many wineries such as Chateau Ste Michelle, Andrew Will, Quilceda Creek Vintners and those located in Woodinville wine country have production facilities and tasting rooms in Western Washington. Seattle also has several urban wineries such as Wilridge Winery. These wineries will often own or buy from vineyards in Eastern Washington and have the grapes trucked over the mountains to their facility. The warmer, drier eastern part of the state is home to the vast Columbia Valley which extends south into Oregon. The Columbia Valley AVA is further divided into several smaller AVAs including Ancient Lakes AVA, Yakima Valley, Walla Walla Valley, Red Mountain, Wahluke Slope, Horse Heaven Hills, Rattlesnake Hills, Snipes Mountain, Candy Mountain, Goose Gap, Royal Slope, The Burn, and White Bluffs. To the north in the larger Columbia Valley AVA is the Lake Chelan AVA and the Ancient Lakes AVA in the north-central part of the state. On the westernmost side of the Columbia Valley in central Washington is the newest AVA, Naches Heights. West of the Columbia Valley is the Columbia Gorge AVA which, along with the Walla Walla AVA, is also shared with Oregon.

=== Columbia Valley AVA ===
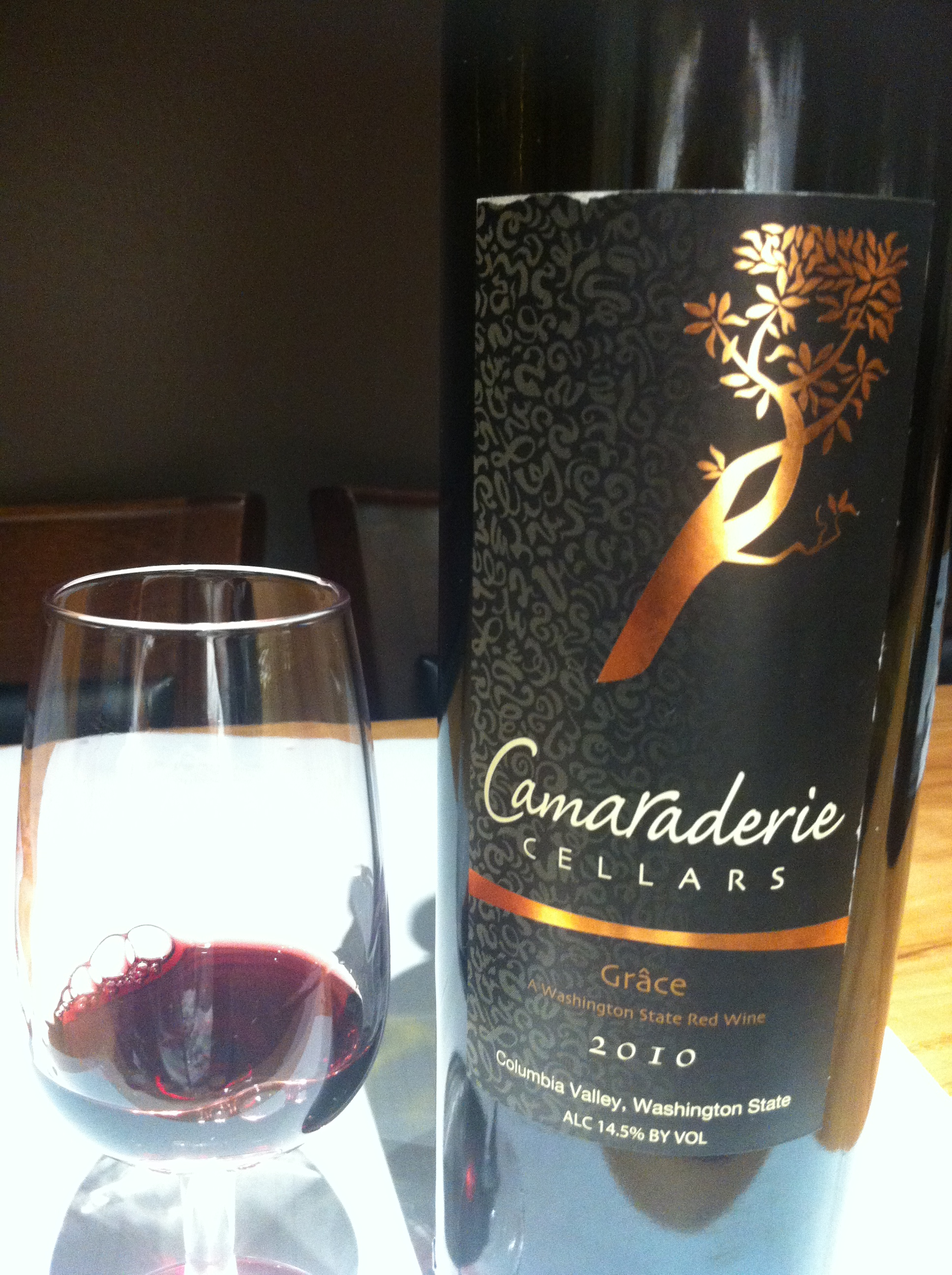
A red blend from the Columbia Valley AVA

The vast Columbia Valley AVA, established in 1984, covers almost one-fourth of the state and extends across the border into Oregon. Within this expansive region are several smaller AVAs including the Ancient Lakes, Horse Heaven Hills, Rattlesnake Hills, Red Mountain, Snipes Mountain, Wahluke Slope, Walla Walla and Yakima Valley AVAs. Of the region's 11 million acres (17,188 sq mi), only 16,670 acres (6,750 ha) were planted as of 2008. The boundaries of the AVA extend south from the Okanagan wilderness and include most of the Columbia River Basin extending east along the Snake River to the Idaho border. Many of the Columbia Valley's vineyards are planted along a broad, semi-arid plateau at altitudes of 1,000-2,000 feet (300–600 meters). The climate of the Columbia is continental, like most of Eastern Washington, though a wide range of microclimates exist. "The area sees anywhere from 1,240 to 1,440 degree days Celsius" with most of these microclimates falling into classifications of Regions I and II on the Winkler scale of heat summation. On average, the Columbia Valley sees over 300 cloudless days per year and experiences no more than 15 inches (380 mm) of rainfall.

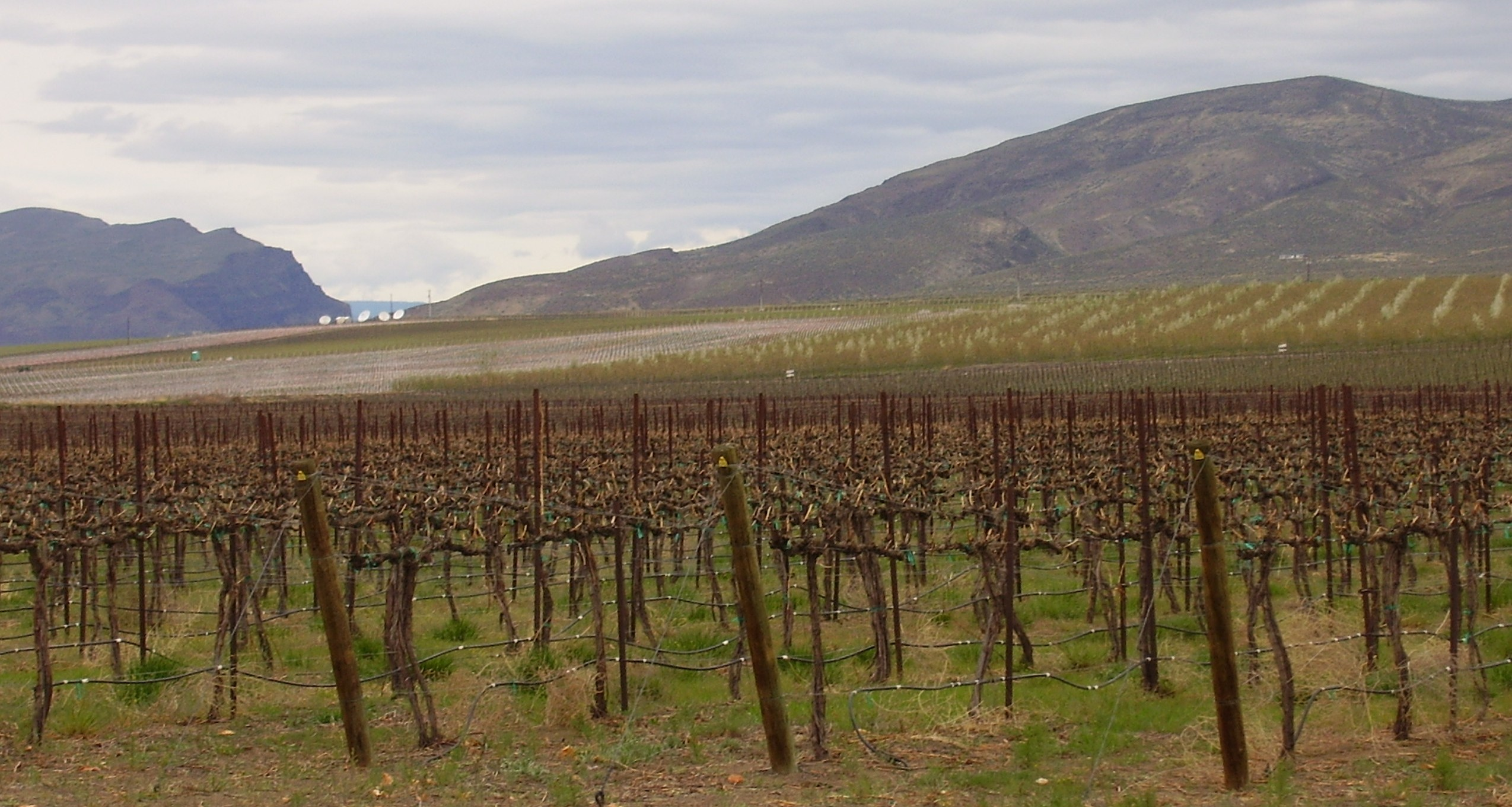
The Wahluke Slope AVA, located among the foothills of the Saddle Mountains (pictured), is one of the warmest and driest regions in the state. Sentinel Gap is in the distance.

The Horse Heaven Hills AVA was established in 2005 and is home to some of the state's largest and oldest vineyards. Of the region's 570,000 acres (230,000 ha), nearly 6,180 acres (2,500 ha) were planted as of 2008. The boundaries of the AVA follow its namesake hills to the north which forms the southern border of the Yakima Valley and extends southward to the Columbia River. In 1972, the first vineyard planted in this region was called Mercer Ranch. Now known as Champoux Vineyard, it is one of the most prestigious and sought-after grapes in the state with its name appearing on several vineyard designated wines. The vineyard is also home to some of the oldest Cabernet Sauvignon vines in the country. Many of the best vineyards are planted along the right bank of the Columbia River, though some areas are prone to exposure to winds in excess of 25 miles per hour (40 km/h) at which point vines are at risk of shutting down metabolically, thereby hindering the ripening process. However, the wind also serves to toughen grape skins, which can moderate temperatures, increase phenols, and keep the vine's canopy dry which aids in disease control.

The Wahluke Slope AVA was established in 2006 and produces, on average, around 20% of the state's wine grapes. Of the region's 81,000 acres (33,000 ha), nearly 5,190 acres (2,100 ha) were planted as of 2008. Located among the foothills south of the Saddle Mountains, the Wahluke Slope is one of the warmest and driest regions in the state. The Columbia River forms the western and southern boundaries of the AVA with the Hanford Reach National Monument bordering the appellation on the east. The vintage characteristics of the Wahluke slope are very consistent year to year due to the area's reliably dry, warm climate and uniform coarse gravelly sand soils that drain water well. More than three-quarters of the area's production is in red wine grapes—particularly Merlot, Cabernet Sauvignon and Syrah. As of 2007, more than 50 wineries purchased grapes from the Wahluke Slope, with many of them featuring the AVA or one of its 20 vineyards on wine labels.

In April 2009 the Lake Chelan AVA, located around Lake Chelan in the Columbia Valley was approved as an American Viticultural Area. The Columbia Valley may be further divided regions near Leavenworth, the Wenatchee Valley and along the eastern foothills of the Cascade Mountains (in a region collectively called the Columbia Cascades) expected to seek federally designation.

In 2012 the Ancient Lakes of the Columbia Valley AVA, located in the Columbia Valley was approved as an American Viticultural Area and contains more than 162,000 acres (253 sq mi) in total area and approximately 1,800 acres (728 ha) of currently planted vineyards.

=== Yakima Valley AVA ===
The Yakima Valley AVA was established in 1983 and is the oldest agricultural region in the state. The third-largest AVA, the area is responsible for more than 40% of the state's entire wine production. Located within the larger Columbia Valley AVA, the Yakima Valley AVA is further sub-divided into the smaller Red Mountain, Snipes Mountain and Rattlesnake Hills AVAs Of the region's 665,000 acres (269,000 ha), nearly 11,120 acres (4,500 ha) were planted as of 2008. Within the larger AVA are vineyards planted in some of the coolest regions in Eastern Washington including Boushey Vineyard. The boundaries of the AVA are framed from the foothills of the Cascade Mountains to the west and follows the path of the Yakima Valley to Red Mountain which shapes its eastern border. The Rattlesnake Hills and Horse Heaven Hills frame the AVA to the north and south, respectively. The Yakima Valley is home to the state's highest concentration of wineries.

The Red Mountain AVA was established in 2001 and is the second smallest wine region in Washington next to Naches Heights. Of the region's 4,040 acres (1,630 ha), nearly 740 acres (300 ha) were planted as of 2008. The vast majority of the AVA is composed of a gentle slope made up of sandy loam soil with the high calcium content. The area has good air drainage with full southern exposure which allows the wine grapes to maintain increased acidity levels and attain optimal ripeness. In recent years Red Mountain has seen increased an interest in the quality of its Cabernet Sauvignon, Cabernet Franc, Syrah and Sangiovese. The soils of Red Mountain are low in nutrients with high pH levels. This limits the vigor of the vine producing low yields, small canopy and grape berry sizes 50-60% smaller than the varietal norm. Despite having a reputation as Washington's most prestigious and highly sought after AVA, growth in the Red Mountain area was limited by lack of available water rights and needed to establish irrigation. In 2005, the Washington Department of Natural Resources released water rights for 600 acres (240 ha) of land suitable for vineyard development. The new developments are expected to increase the profile of the AVA.

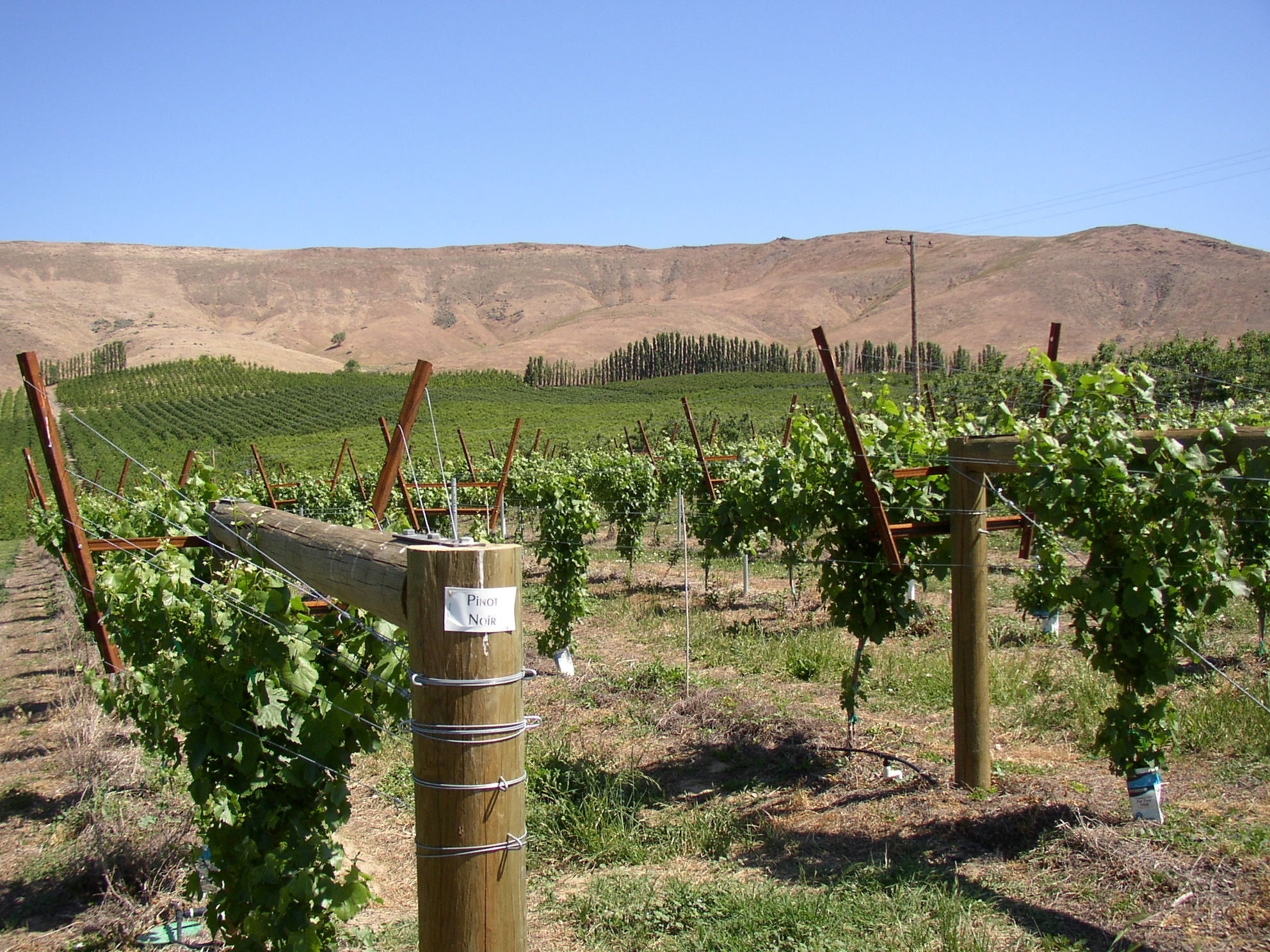
Pinot noir grapes in May in the Rattlesnake Hills AVA. The Rattlesnake Hills lie in the background.

The Rattlesnake Hills AVA was established in 2006 amidst some controversy about whether the terroir of the region was sufficiently different from that of the greater Yakima Valley AVA. Of the region's 68,500 acres (27,700 ha), nearly 1,235 acres (500 ha) were planted as of 2008. The appellation covers the northern expanse of the Yakima Valley and features the highest elevation in the valley ranging from 850 feet (260 m) to 3,000 feet (910 m). Regional temperatures are moderate during the peak growing season but are significantly warmer in winter when compared to other parts of the Columbia Valley (an average of 8-10 degrees Fahrenheit), limiting the frost danger in the appellation.

The Snipes Mountain AVA was established in 2009. At 4,145 acres (1,677 ha), it is one of Washington's smaller wine regions. The viticultural area is located on Snipes Mountain, a long anticline ridge that rises from the floor of the Lower Yakima Valley with comparatively unique, rocky soils, called aridisols. The viticultural area also includes Harrison Hill, which lies contiguously east of Snipes Mountain and has similar soil and topography.

=== Walla Walla Valley AVA ===
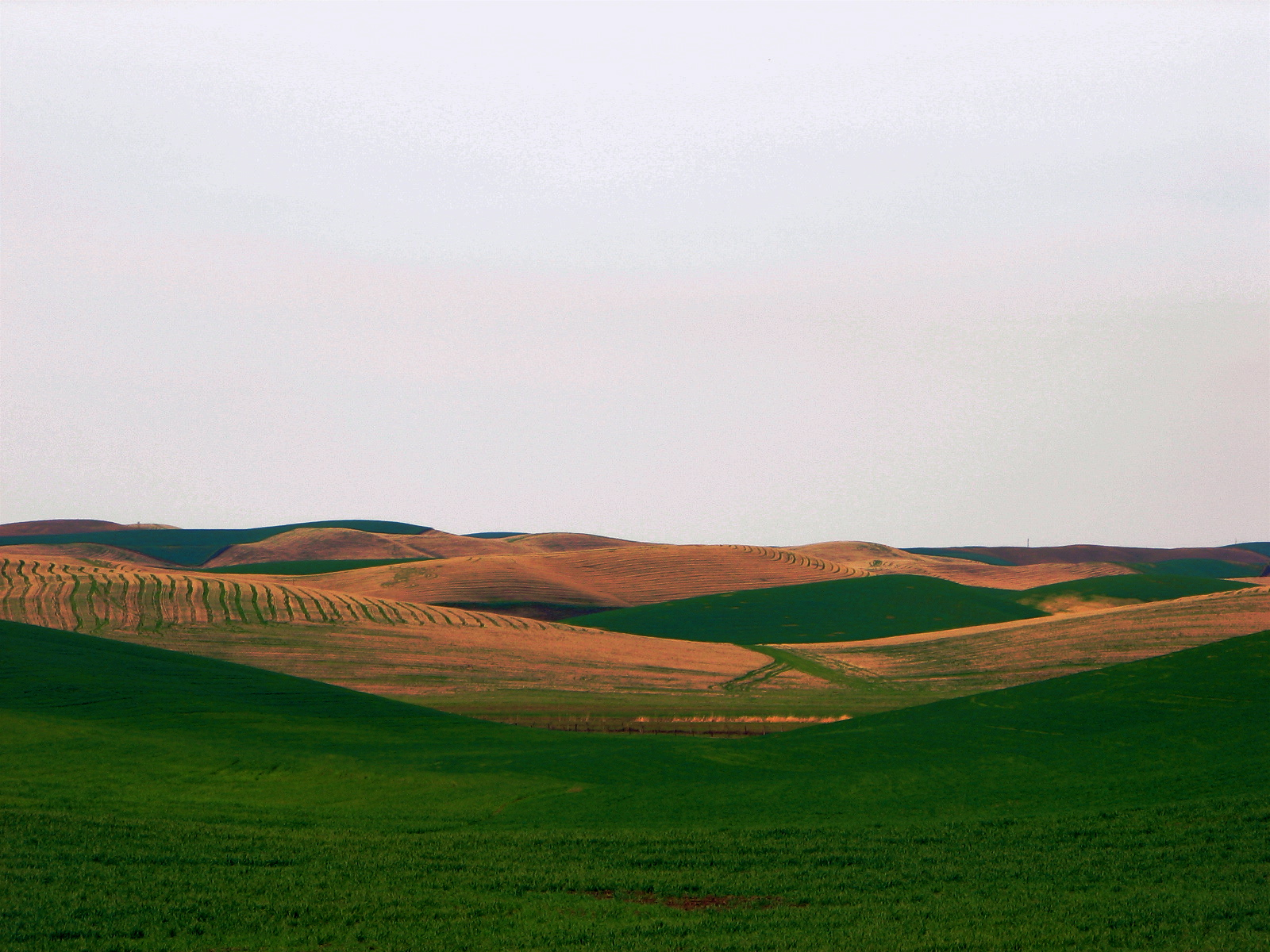
The Walla Walla Valley generally receives more precipitation than the rest of the Columbia Valley.

The Walla Walla Valley AVA was established in 1984 with its boundaries amended in 2001. Mostly contained within Washington, a portion of this appellation does extend south into Oregon. Of the region's 303,500 acres (122,800 ha), nearly 1,110 acres (450 ha) were planted as of 2008. Along with its wine, Walla Walla is known for its sweet onions, which is a local food and wine pairing favorite, especially the Merlot grown within the appellation. The region is generally wetter than the rest of the Columbia Valley, receiving more than 20 inches (50 centimeter) of rain on average each year. The area between the town of Walla Walla east to the Blue Mountains is the wettest with each mile from the city eastward to the mountains seeing an addition inch of average rainfall. The Walla Walla Valley contains at least four distinct soil profiles scattered across the valley – slackwater terrace, loess, river gravel and flood plain silt. The majority of Walla Walla Valley's vineyards are located on a combination of slackwater terrace and loess. The silt and volcanic ash that make up the region's loess soils contain remnants from the eruption of Mount Mazama (which also formed the Crater Lake nearly 400 miles (640 km) away in Oregon).

=== Other regions ===
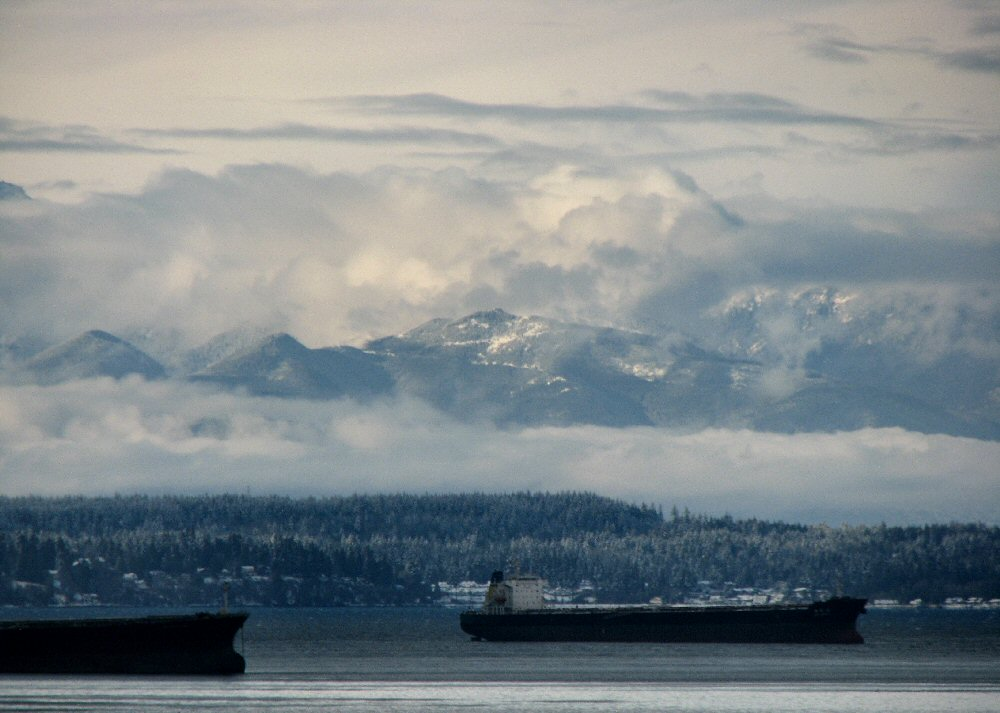
Due to the rain shadow effect of the Cascade Mountains (pictured in background), the Puget Sound AVA receives much more precipitation and is generally cooler than the drier eastern half of the state.

The Columbia Gorge AVA was established in 2004. Of the region's 179,200 acres (72,500 ha), nearly 445 acres (180 ha) were planted as of 2008. Similar to the Columbia Valley and Walla Walla AVAs, this appellation also crosses over the southern Washington border into Oregon where Pinot noir and Pinot Gris are grown. Located along the Columbia River where it bisects the Cascade Range, parts of the AVA fall within a wind tunnel that is a popular tourist destination for wind surfing but can be too fierce for viticulture. Most of the vineyards planted on the Washington side of the appellation are located on southward facing slopes along the river where they can receive some protection from the winds. Depending upon the elevation, vineyards in the Columbia Gorge AVA receive anywhere from 18-30 inches (46-76 centimeters) of rain annually.

The Puget Sound AVA is the only wine-growing region located in Western Washington. Of the region's 4.75 million acres (1.9 million hectare), only 200 acres (81 ha) were planted as of 2008 – mostly to cool weather varieties like Madeleine Angevine, Chardonnay, Pinot Gris, Pinot noir and Siegerrebe. Granted AVA status in 1995, the appellation extends from the foothills of the Cascades to the Olympic Peninsula and islands located in Puget Sound. The climate is greatly affected by the marine influences of nearby Puget Sound and the Pacific Ocean which contributes to mild temperatures, wet winters and dry summers – all of which make it ideal for some cool-climate grape varieties. The region experiences more sunshine than Bordeaux and is drier in average precipitation than Burgundy.

== Grape varieties ==
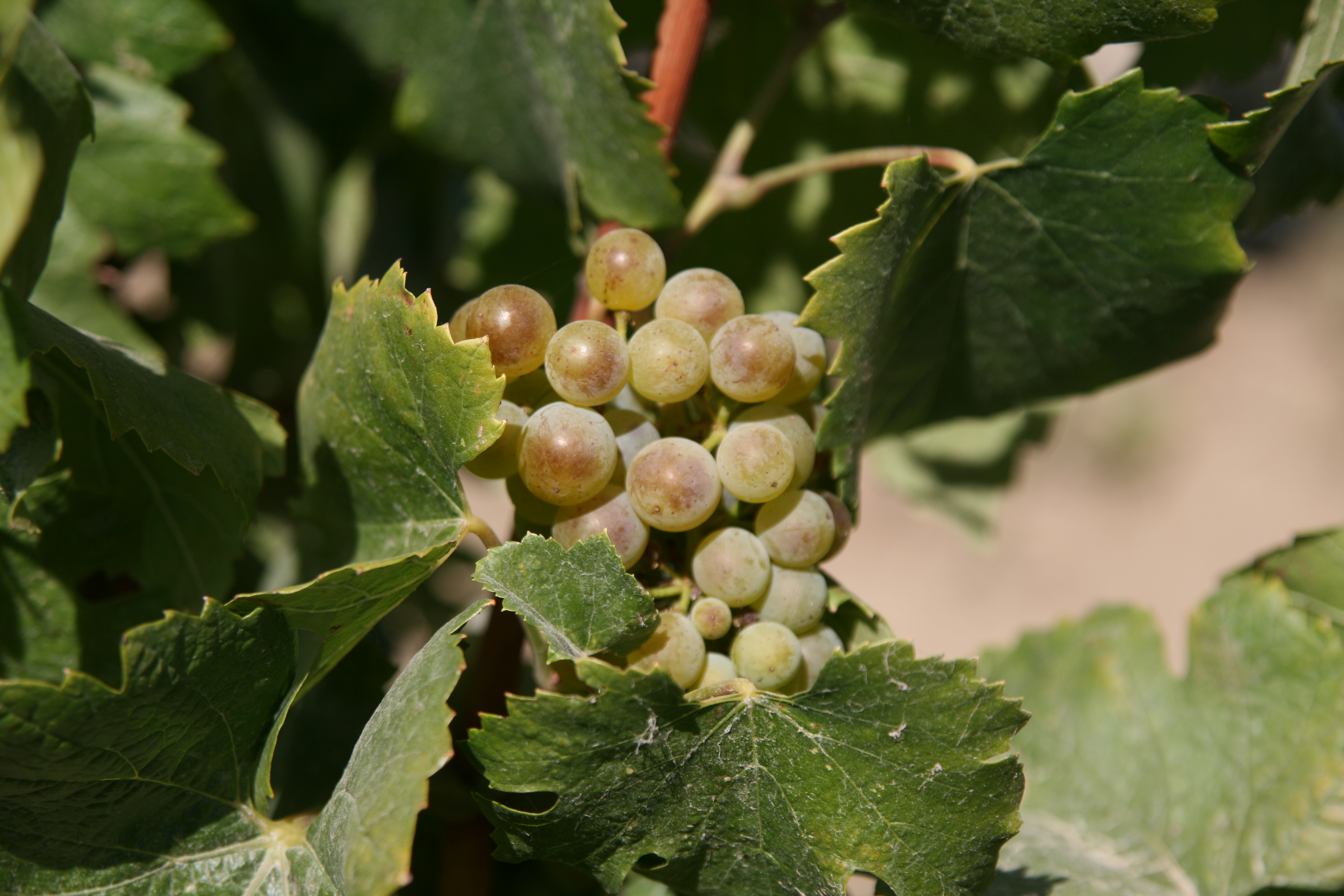
Riesling grapes from the Yakima Valley

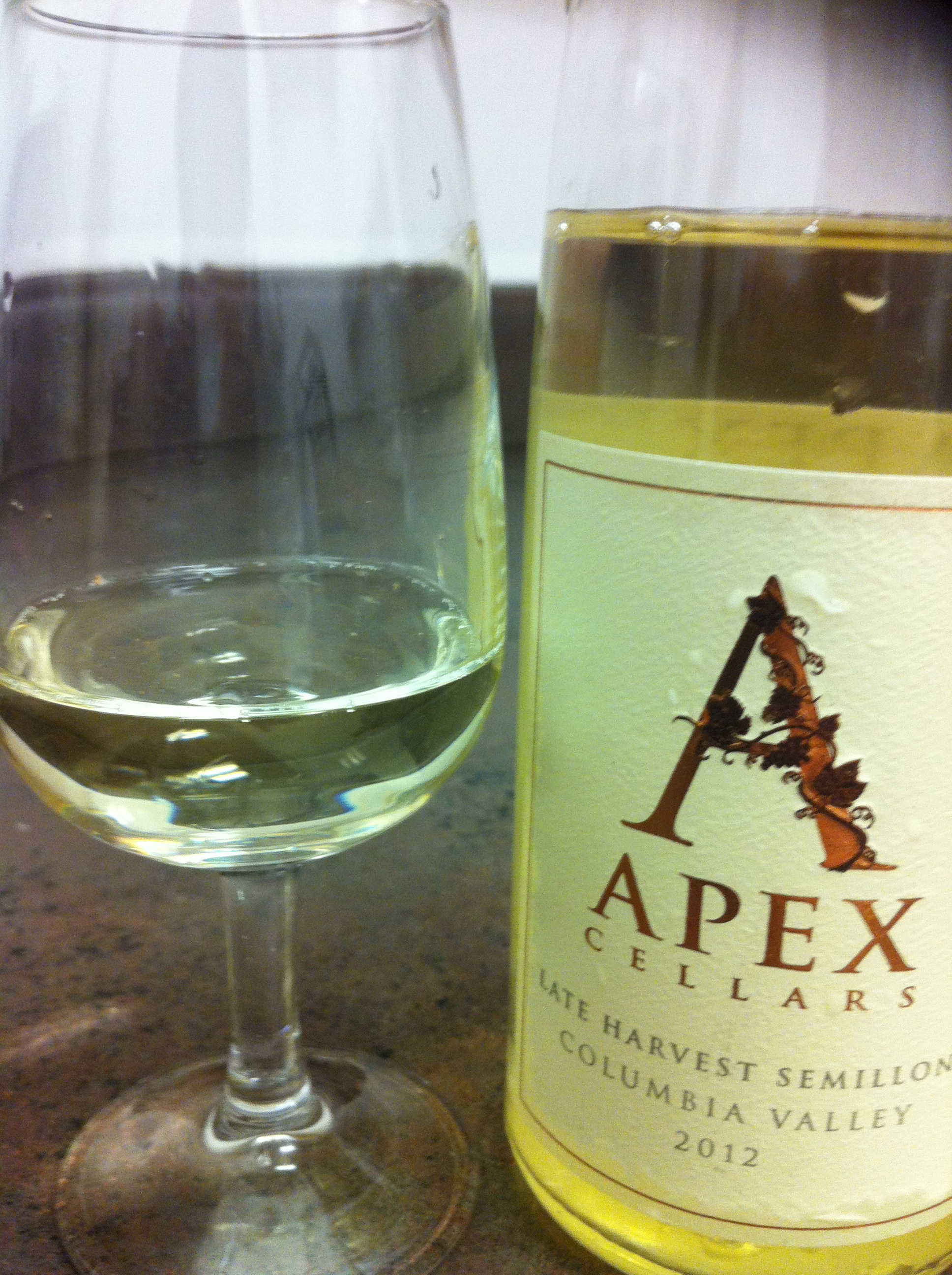
A late harvest Sémillon from the Columbia Valley

The early Washington wine industry focused predominately on white wines but in recent years, led by the "Merlot craze" of the 1990s have shifted the focus to the state's red wines. Chardonnay also experienced a surge of interest in the 1990s and along with Riesling are among the most widely planted grape varieties in the state. While the acreage of Riesling has been steadily declining, there has been renewed interest in the grape in recent years that has been bolstered by the joint Eroica venture between Chateau Ste. Michelle and German winemaker Ernst Loosen and the investment by Bonny Doon founder's Randall Grahm to open a winery focused solely on Riesling production. Experts like Jancis Robinson have noted that Washington state consistently produces white wines of exceptional quality, specifically mentioning those of the Sémillon variety. Merlot was one of the first major vinifera varieties to garner international attention for the state with its distinctive earthiness and structure that can be very different from the softer, plusher styles found in California. However the Merlot vine is very sensitive to frost and after significant damages during major winter freezes in 1996 and 2003, more vintners turned their attention to the hardier Cabernet Sauvignon and Cabernet Franc. This led to interest in Bordeaux-style blends. In the early 21st century, Syrah has emerged on the scene as a major player.

Today there are over 80 grape varieties grown in Washington state, but the primary grapes used in the production of wine are from the Vitis vinifera family of grapes. The main grapes used in wine production in Washington are Cabernet Sauvignon, Riesling, Chardonnay, Merlot, and Syrah. There are also plantings of Cabernet Franc, Grenache, Malbec, Pinot gris, Sauvignon blanc, Sémillon, Tempranillo, Viognier, Barbera, Chenin blanc, Gewürztraminer, Nebbiolo, Petite Sirah, Pinot noir, Sangiovese, and Zinfandel. Vineyard acreage dedicated to red varieties was 17,351 acres (7,022 ha) in 2006. The four most prevalent red varieties were Cabernet Sauvignon at 5,959 acres (2,412 ha), Merlot at 5,853 acres (2,369 ha), Syrah at 2,831 acres (1,146 ha), and Cabernet Franc at 1,157 acres (468 ha). Vineyard acreage planted to white varieties was 13,649 acres (5,524 ha). The four most prevalent white varieties were Chardonnay at 5,992 acres (2,425 ha), Riesling at 4,404 acres (1,782 ha), Sauvignon blanc at 993 acres (402 ha), and Gewürztraminer at 632 acres (256 ha).

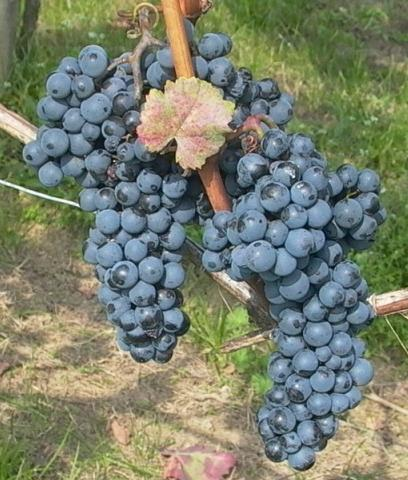
Washington State is one of the few major wine regions to have significant plantings of Lemberger (known as Blaufrankisch in Austria).

Washington State is also home to plantings of some lesser known Vitis vinifera varieties that are used in wine production for some experimental wines and blending. These include Abouriou, Alicante Bouschet, Aligoté, Auxerrois, Black Cornichon, Black Monukka, Black Muscat, Black Prince, Blauer Portugieser, Calzin, Carignane, Chasselas, Chauche gris, Clevner Mariafeld, Colombard, Csaba, Ehrenfelser, Feher Szagos, Gamay, Green Hungarian, Lemberger, Madeleine Angevine, Madeleine Sylvaner, Melon de Bourgogne, Mission, Morio Muscat, Müller-Thurgau, Muscat of Alexandria, Muscat Canelli, Muscat Ottonel, Palomino, Petit Verdot, Pinot blanc, Pinot Meunier, Pirovano, Rkatsiteli, Rose of Peru, Salvador, Sauvignon vert, Scheurebe, Siegerrebe, Sylvaner, Trollinger, and Trousseau. Some notable French hybrid grapes used in wine production include Aurore and Baco noir.

== Wines ==
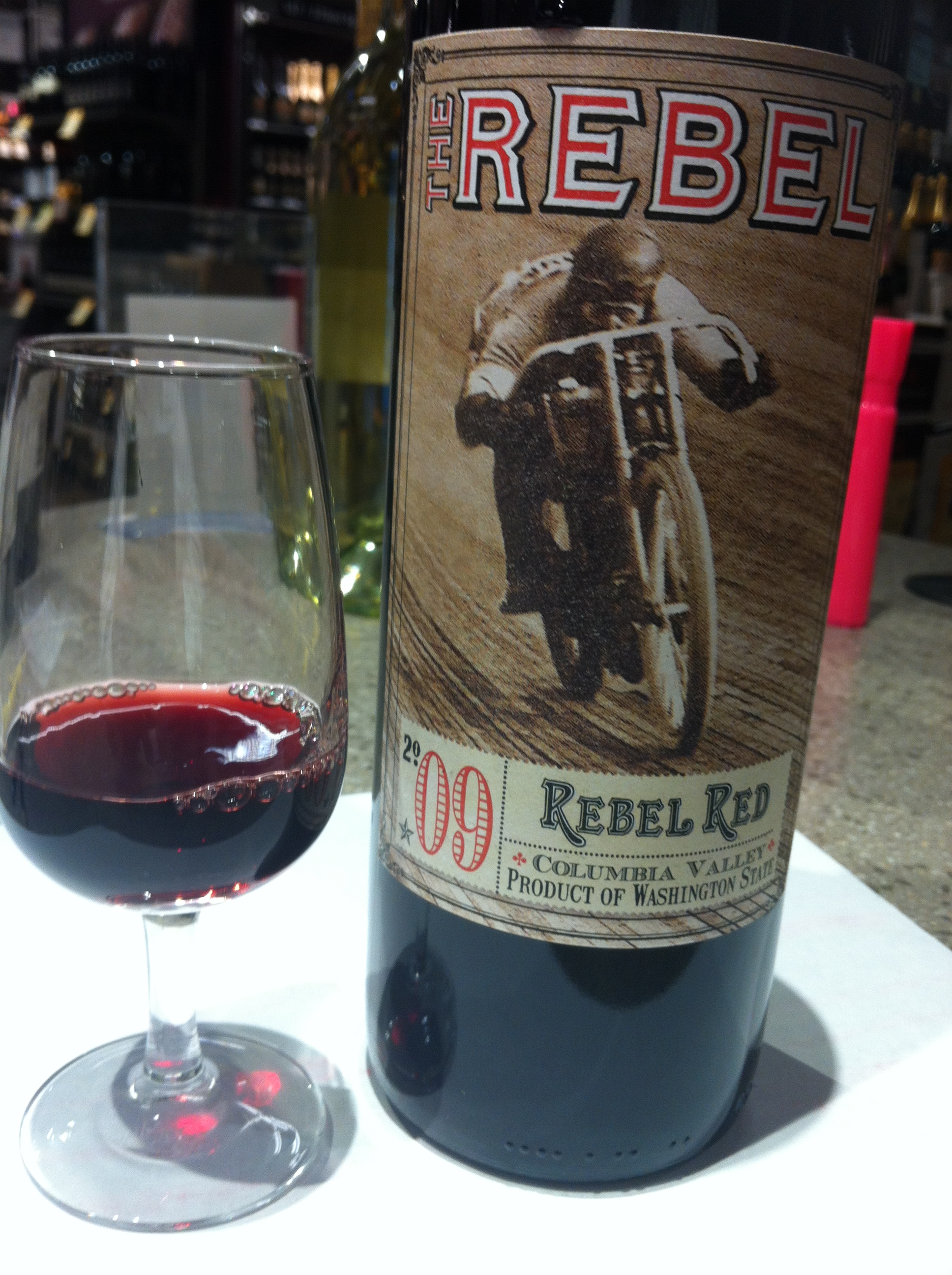
A red blend from the Columbia Valley AVA of Washington State

The wines of Washington State are often characterized by their bright fruit flavors and crisp acidity. In recent years, the state's red wines have leaned towards riper, more fruit-forward flavors, noticeable tannins and oak influence with moderately high alcohol levels. Wine experts such as Jancis Robinson and Hugh Johnson have described quality examples of Washington wines to exhibit fresh acidity, deep coloring, with bright, intense fruit flavors that can usually age in the bottle for at least 8 years before the fruit structure starts to fade. Karen MacNeil notes that the red wines of Washington, especially the Cabernets and Merlots, often exhibited lush texture with very concentrated berry flavors reminiscent of the wild fruit found in the Pacific Northwest such as blackberries, boysenberries, cherries and raspberries. The state is often described as combining New World fruit with Old World style. Paul Gregutt, wine writer for The Seattle Times and Wine Enthusiast describes Washington wines as maintaining strong purity and typicity of varietal flavors with firm, ripe tannins and bright acidity. Gregutt says Washington wines have the potential to combine the structure and polish of French wines with the ripeness and fruit of California wines.

Washington produces a full spectrum of wines ranging from mass-produced to premium boutique wines. It also produces nearly every style of wine including rosé, sparkling, fruit, fortified, still and late harvest dessert wines afflicted with Botrytis cinerea. Some years can even produce favorable conditions for ice wine production. In 2006, The Wine Advocate gave two perfect scores of 100 points for Cabernet Sauvignon wines made by Quilceda Creek Vintners using grapes from several Washington American Viticultural Areas. Only 15 other American wines have ever been scored so highly by The Wine Advocate, all from California. Chateau Ste. Michelle Wine Estates (which owns the original Chateau. Ste Michelle label as well as several others) is the largest producer in the state, owning more than a third of all vineyard land in Washington.

== Challenges in the consumer market ==
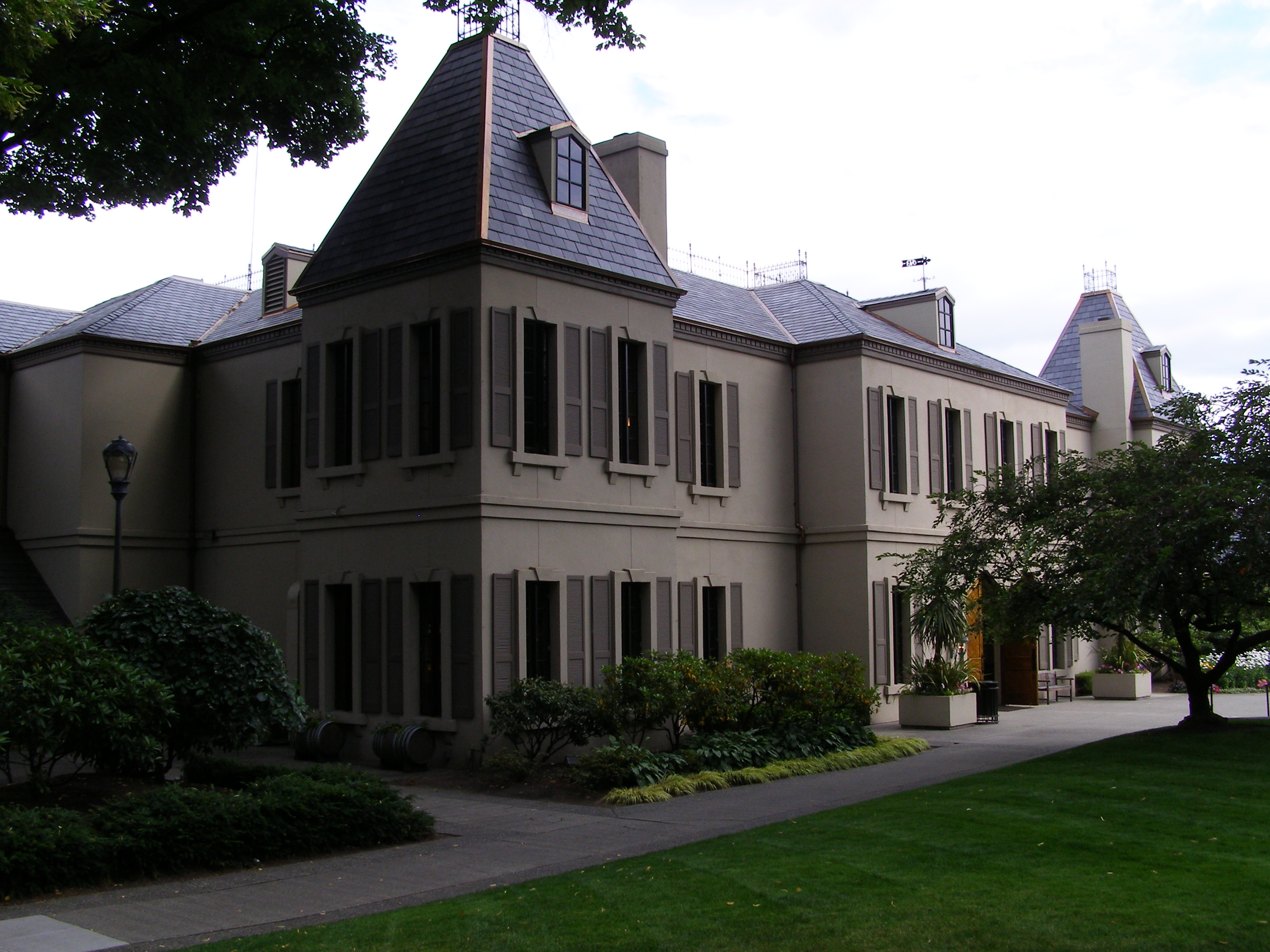
Chateau Ste. Michelle Wine Estates is the largest producer in Washington State.

In his book Washington Wines and Wineries: The Essential Guide, Paul Gregutt, a wine writer for The Seattle Times and Wine Enthusiast, found that there is a common perception that Washington does not excel with any particular flagship variety or blend, as is common in most of the world's notable wine regions such as Napa Valley with Cabernet Sauvignon, the Mosel with Riesling, Australia with Shiraz, Chablis with Chardonnay and Pomerol with Merlot-based blends. There is also a perception that Washington wines are more expensive than other New World wine regions despite the fact that the state's two largest producers (Chateau Ste. Michelle and Columbia Winery) focus primarily on value wine production. This may be partly due, as Gregutt noted, to the fact that many consumers think that Chateau Ste. Michelle and Columbia Winery are California wine producers. While some wineries in Washington are large corporate-run businesses, many Washington wineries are small family-run businesses, with production often less than 25,000 gallons per year. Smaller wineries typically sell much or even a majority of their production direct to consumers through tasting rooms.

Despite producing significantly more wine than neighboring Oregon, Washington wine lags far behind in consumer recognition among the general wine market. Wine experts such as Tom Stevenson speculate that this is because the wine industry in Oregon is uniquely associated with one main varietal – Pinot noir – while Washington has yet to shape an identity around any particular varietal or blend but instead aims to succeed in producing many varietals and blends of high quality. The similarity between the name of the state and the capital of the United States – Washington D.C. – may also contribute to the wine industry's lower profile. Master of Wine Bob Betz, who represented Chateau Ste. Michelle for 28 years as an educator and now makes wine under his own label, noted that often in his travels internationally and across the United States he would get asked "which side of the Potomac?" that Washington wine grapes were grown on. According to Betz, a significant challenge to the Washington wine industry is increasing consumer awareness and name recognition of the state's AVAs that appear on wine labels. As of 2026, there are 22 designated AVAs in Washington State with Columbia Hills AVA in Klickitat County on the Columbia River the most recent addition.
