= Pirovano =

Pirovano (pronounced [piˈrɔːvano]) is an Italian surname from Lombardy, originally derived from a place name likely from Ancient Greek pyrógonos (πυρόγονος, "fire-born"). Notable people with the surname include:

- Anton Maria Pirovano (fl. 1720–1770), Italian sculptor, painter and architect
- Daisy Pirovano (born 1977), Italian politician
- Fabrizio Pirovano (1960–2016), Italian motorcycle racer
- Giovan Battista Pirovano (1937–2014), Italian footballer
- Laura Pirovano (born 1997), Italian alpine ski racer
- Maifreda da Pirovano (died 1300), Italian mystic
- Mario Pirovano (born 1950), Italian theatrical actor, storyteller, translator and interpreter.

The name may also refer to:

- Hospital Pirovano, a hospital in Buenos Aires, Argentina.
