= Lake Chelan AVA =

American Viticultural Area in Washington

Coordinates: 47°50′06″N 120°04′51″W

Lake Chelan
- Wine region
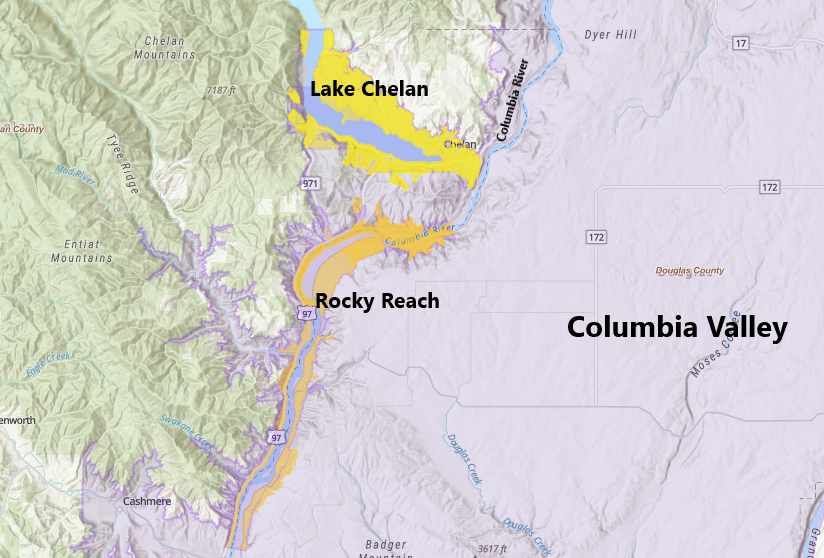
- Year established: 2009
- Years of wine industry: 135
- Country: United States
- Part of: Washington, Columbia Valley AVA
- Other regions in Washington, Columbia Valley AVA: Ancient Lakes of Columbia Valley AVA, Beverly, Washington AVA, Candy Mountain AVA, Goose Gap AVA, Horse Heaven Hills AVA, Naches Heights AVA, Rattlesnake Hills AVA, Red Mountain AVA, Rocky Reach AVA, Royal Slope AVA, Snipes Mountain AVA, The Burn of Columbia Valley AVA, Wahluke Slope AVA, Walla Walla Valley AVA, White Bluffs AVA, Yakima Valley AVA
- Growing season: 175 days
- Climate region: Region III
- Heat units: 3,107 GDD units
- Precipitation (annual average): 10.4 in (264 mm)
- Soil conditions: Layers of glacial debris, stream erosion, airborne volcanic & non-volcanic sediment, sand, fine gravel-sized pumice & loam
- Total area: 24,040 acres (38 sq mi)
- Size of planted vineyards: 344 acres (139 ha)
- No. of vineyards: 40+
- Grapes produced: Barbera, Cabernet Franc, Cabernet Sauvignon, Carmenere, Chardonnay, Dolcetto, Gewurztraminer, Grenache, Pinot Meunier, Malbec, Merlot, Muscat Blanc, Orange Muscat, Petite Syrah, Petite Verdot, Pinot Gris, Pinot Noir, Riesling, Semillon, Sangiovese, Sauvignon Blanc, Syrah, Tannat, Tempranillo, Viognier, Zinfandel
- No. of wineries: 40+

Lake Chelan is an American Viticultural Area (AVA) located within the Lake Chelan Valley landform in Chelan County and north-central Washington state about 112 miles (180 km) northeast of Seattle. The wine region was established as the nation's 193^{rd}, the state's eleventh and Columbia Valley's eighth appellation on April 29, 2009 by the Alcohol and Tobacco Tax and Trade Bureau (TTB), Treasury after reviewing the petition submitted by Alan J. Busacca, PhD, a state-licensed geologist and a nationally certified soil scientist of Vinitas Vineyard Consultants, LLC, on behalf of the Lake Chelan Wine Growers Association proposing the viticultural area named "Lake Chelan."

The 24,040-acre (38 sq mi) appellation encompasses the southern and eastern portions of the Lake Chelan Valley and the surrounding Cascade foothills suitable for viticulture. It lies as a sub-appellation on the northwestern border of the vast Columbia Valley AVA, east of the Puget Sound AVA and north or west of the other Washington State viticultural areas. As of 2025, 344 acres (139 ha) are being cultivated on over forty vineyards sourcing about forty wineries and tasting rooms.

== History ==
The "Chelan" geographic name derives from the name that Alexander Ross, an American fur trader, whose writings in 1824 described the native people as the "Tsill-anes," who lived along the south shore of Lake Chelan and the short river that drained the lake to the Columbia.
According to the Chelan Valley Mirror dated May 1, 1947, Urban DeGrassi, a Jesuit priest, spent several years in the Lake Chelan region teaching Native Americans about agriculture. Based on Father DeGrassi’s teachings, in 1881, John and Peter Wapato, Native Americans of Chelan Valley, started planting fruit eventually including grapes and cherries. According to an article in the August 6, 1891 edition of the Chelan Falls Leader, Louis Conti, an Italian immigrant, owned a 60 acres (24 ha) vineyard in the Lake Chelan area. The article stated that a colony of Italian immigrants, living on the sunnier south side of the lake, planted grape vines on their claimed lands. Two 1905 photographs from the Chelan County Historical Society show grapes growing in the Lake Chelan area. A photo of grapes on the vine is labeled "Black Hamburg Grapes—Lake Chelan." The petitioner explains that the common name for those grapes is Black Muscat. The other photo, which shows a little boy sitting on the ground beside grapes hanging heavily from a vine, is labeled "Lake Chelan Grapes." The Faletto family continued growing grapes into the early 1900's, according to an e-mail dated November 22, 2005, from family member Rich Faletto. Mr. Faletto stated of his grandfather, "Old John was the vintner and winery operator in the valley, producing great wine from [grapevines] brought to the area by a group of Italians." The Chelan and Manson areas, within the viticultural area, comprised 154 acres (62 ha) of producing vineyards, according to a November 17, 1949, newspaper article written by Harry R. McMullen. According to the article, that year grape growers received 2 cents a pound, or $40 a ton, from the Welch Company.
The first wine grapes were planted in the Lake Chelan region in 1891, but it wasn't until the late 20th century when the area became a popular tourist destination with a developed modern wine industry. The petitioner states that in 1998, Steve Kludt and Bob Christopher replanted apple orchards to grapes within the Lake Chelan viticultural area. Also, in 2000 the Kludt family opened the first bonded winery in the area and in 2001 started selling wine. Vineyard production in the Lake Chelan region increased from over 90 acres (36 ha) in 2004 to 140 acres (57 ha) by 2006.
A group of Chelan wineries started the process developing a petition to submit to the TTB for an AVA application in 2002. The proposal process was significantly delayed when, in the summer of 2007, the TTB issued a "freeze" on approving any AVA petition due to controversy surrounding the proposal for the Calistoga AVA in the Napa Valley region of California. A roadblock that the Lake Chelan AVA and the Calistoga petitions encountered was the requirement that any winery bearing an AVA on its wine labels must source at least 85% of their grapes from the AVA. While there was a grandfather clause in the regulation for wineries existing prior to July 7, 1986, there were at least five wineries in the Lake Chelan AVA that contained the word "Chelan" on their labels and opened after the cut off date. All of these wineries had to submit to the labeling regulation that less than 15% of the grape used in their wines is allowed to be sourced from outside Lake Chelan AVA.
The TTB eventually lifted the roadblock and approved the Lake Chelan petition in April 2009 with the designation slated to take effect in late May 2008. The approval made the Lake Chelan the second wine region in the state to be recognized in 2009, following the January approval of the Snipes Mountain AVA. According to the petitioner, 13 bonded wineries operated in the Lake Chelan area as of the 2006 petition submission date.

== Terroir ==
Lake Chelan AVA located in Chelan County

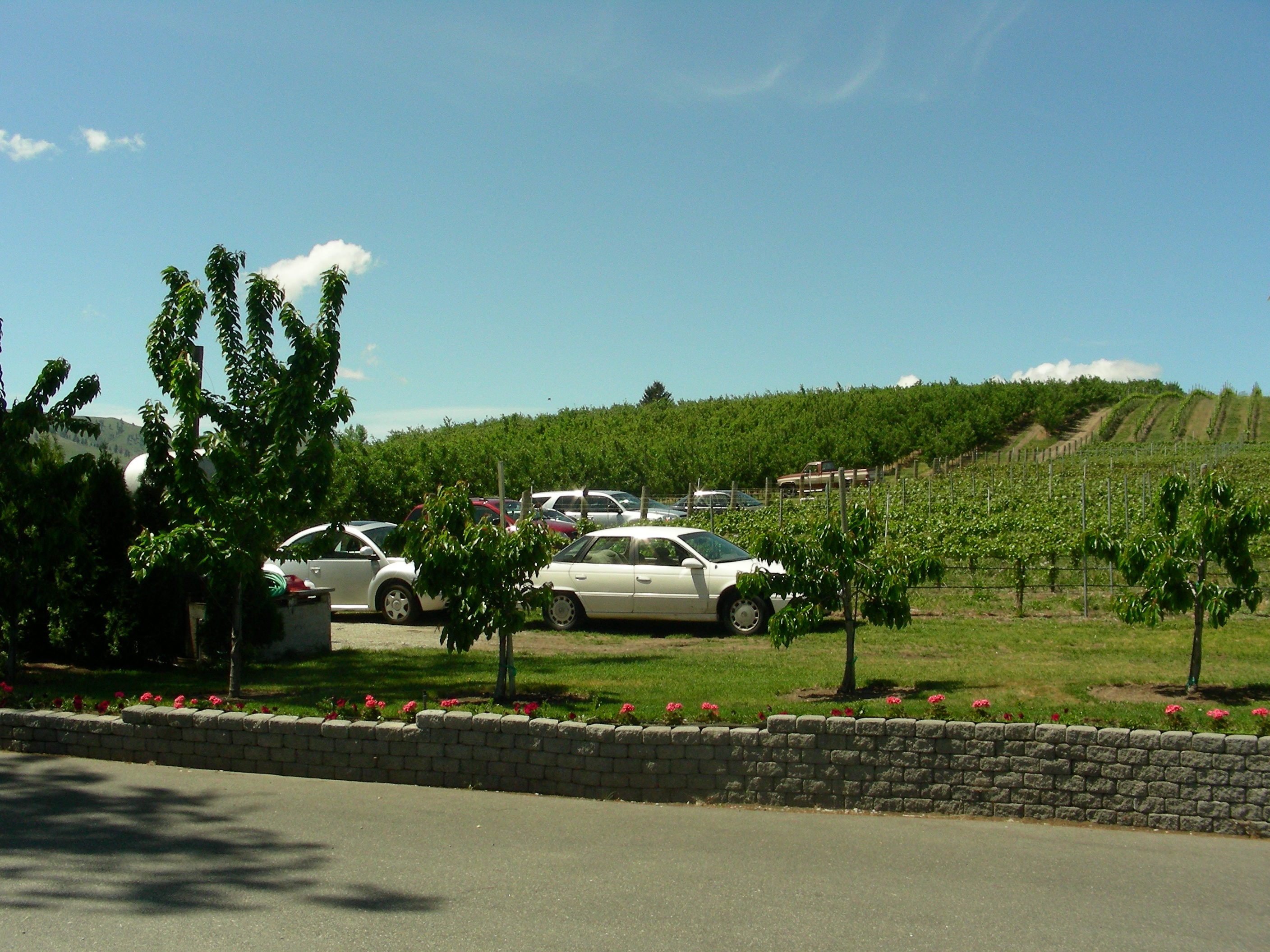
The Vin du Lac Vineyard its tasting room in Lake Chelan AVA.

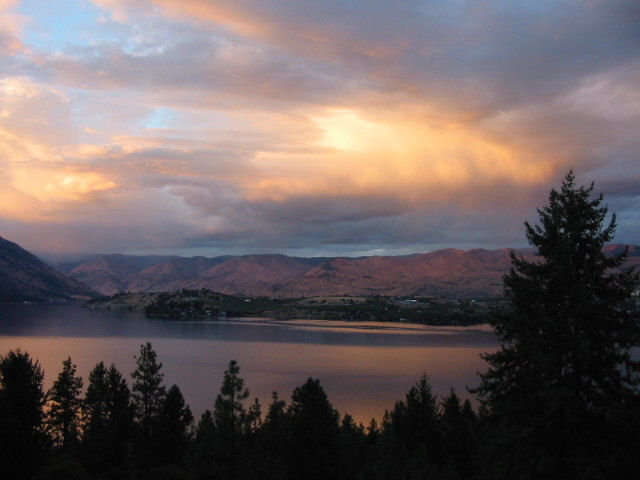
Sunset at Lake Chelan

=== Geography ===
The AVA is located in north-central Washington, in the eastern foothills of the Cascade Mountains above the Columbia River Plateau. The Lake Chelan region has a higher elevation and unique soil components that differentiate the area from other wine regions of the Columbia Valley located to the south. Elevations vary from approximately 1,100 feet (335 m) at lake level to 3,276 feet (999 m) at an unnamed peak in the northwest portion of the Lake Chelan viticultural area, 1.8 miles (3 km) northwest of Lake Chelan State Park on the USGS Manson quadrangle map. The lower elevations, which have gently rising slopes, are along the southern and eastern shoreline of Lake Chelan, as shown on the USGS maps of the region. The lower lakeside elevations are known for successful fruit growing. The higher elevations enveloping the Lake Chelan Valley region generally correlate with steep terrain, as shown on the USGS maps of the viticultural area. According to the petitioner, when the Cascade alpine glaciers descended from the mountain crests to lower elevations, they created the distinctive U-shaped Lake Chelan Valley topography, including the lake depression. The term "camel-backed" describes the landforms of the Lake Chelan Valley at low elevations and adjacent surrounding mountains. The Cascade alpine glaciers created other valleys in the region with similar landscapes, including camel-backed topography, and layers of glacial sediment, but not lake basins. Thus, only Lake Chelan Valley, in contrast to the other regional glacial valleys, has a climate-moderating lake effect.

=== Climate ===
The climate of the Lake Chelan AVA is influenced by the lake itself which creates a "lake effect" that moderates temperatures throughout the growing season and protects against frost damage in winter by re-radiating heat absorbed during the summer in the later months of fall and winter. This has an effect of extending the "hang time" of the fruit on the vine which allows sugars and acids in the grape to stay in balance as phenols develop that can add complexity to the wine. According to local growers and temperature statistics, a lake effect moderates air temperature extremes in both summer and winter in the Lake Chelan viticultural area. The combination of moderating summer high and winter low temperatures creates a suitable environment for both viticulture and tree fruit agriculture. The strong lake effect moderates the air temperatures of planted areas adjacent north and south of the eastern part of the lake. In those areas, the waters of Lake Chelan create a heat reservoir that absorbs warming solar energy in summer and then reradiates heat energy into cold air in winter. The petitioner uses a cool-climate viticultural suitability index (CCVSI) formulated at Cornell University as an analytical tool for the Lake Chelan Valley climate. The CCVSI emphasizes the impact of temperature moderation on viticulture. The petitioner explains that the CCVSI compiles the sum of the days from the last occurrence of 29 °F (−2 °C) or lower in spring until the first occurrence of 29 degrees Fahrenheit or lower in fall. The larger total numbers, in days, generally correlate to the better viticultural regions.
For the Lake Chelan Valley region, the CCVSI 10-year average of 244 days is significantly higher than the glacially formed Methow Valley in the Cascade Range to the north and higher than the Wanatchee Valley to the south. In another measure of the lake effect on the Lake Chelan viticultural area, the petitioner uses the annual average number of days with temperatures of 32 degrees Fahrenheit or lower in winter and 95 degrees Fahrenheit or higher in summer. The petitioner compares the climates in Lake Chelan Valley, Methow Valley, and Wenatchee Valley using this method. All three valleys are located within 60 miles (97 km) of each other, were created partially or wholly by Cascade alpine glaciers, and have other similar geographic features. Lake Chelan Valley averages 7 days a year above 95 degrees Fahrenheit, and Methow Valley and Wenatchee Valley average 14 days a year, according to data from the National Climate Data Center included with the petition. Fewer hot days in the Lake Chelan Valley correlate with better fruit quality, because temperatures above 95 degrees shut down most photosynthesis in grapes, according to the petitioner. The Lake Chelan Valley averages only 90 days a year colder than 32 degrees Fahrenheit in winter, while the Methow Valley averages 148 days and the Wenatchee Valley averages 102 days. Northwest of the viticultural area, temperatures are too low for viticulture because of cold air drainage from the high Cascades and severe shading from steep mountainsides close to the lake. To the east and northeast of the viticultural area, a ridge holds the lake-affected air masses in the lake basin. That ridge is used as the eastern boundary. To further demonstrate the moderating lake effect, the petitioner provides evidence concerning vine-killing freezes which, according to the petitioner, occur less frequently in the Lake Chelan viticultural area than in other viticultural areas in eastern Washington State. Winemaker Charles Ray Sandidge III, in an October 2, 2006, e-mail to the petitioner, states that he conducted a study of weather data in the period 1934–84 in the regions of Wahluke Slope, Walla Walla, Chelan, East Wenatchee, and Roosevelt. Results, based on cold temperature readings, indicated that the Lake Chelan area averaged a killing freeze once in 17 years, while the other Washington viticultural areas studied averaged 6 to 8 years between vine-killing freezes. Mr. Sandidge states that Lake Chelan averages a heavy crop loss and a light vine loss every 17 years. Also, fall temperatures cool more rapidly and rains arrive about a week earlier than in areas to the south. Mr. Sandidge theorizes that while the Lake Chelan area experiences milder winter temperatures, the later spring bud break relates to the close proximity of the viticultural area to the surrounding mountains. The USDA plant hardiness zones are 7a and 7b.

=== Soils ===
The soils of the Lake Chelan Valley include layers of glacial debris, sediment from normal stream erosion and deposition after the glacial age, and airborne volcanic and nonvolcanic sediments. The lower parts of the deeper soils, 20 to 60 inches (508 to 1,524 mm) below the surface, predominantly formed in glacial sediments. The upper part of the soils formed in a mixture of large amounts of airborne volcanic pumice and ash from Glacier Peak and very small amounts of loess (wind- transported material) overlying the glacial sediments. Thus, the soils downwind from Glacier Peak and the north Cascades, including the soils in the Lake Chelan viticultural area, are rich, about 3 to 40 percent by volume, in volcanic pumice and ash from a massive eruption of the Glacier Peak volcano about 12,000 years ago. The petitioner explains that bedrock in the Lake Chelan viticultural area consists of Cretaceous-age granitic rocks and older metamorphic rocks, including amphibolite, schist, and biotite gneiss. Glaciers shattered and crushed the Cascade crystalline bedrock, creating glacial till and glacial outwash sediments that include biotite mica-rich cobbly, bouldery, gravelly, and coarse sandy materials.
The soils in Lake Chelan Valley that are close to the surface include sand- and fine gravel-sized pumice from the volcanic eruption of Glacier Peak to the northwest. Soils that have significant amounts of volcanic ash and pumice or clays weathered from glass have an unusually high available water capacity. The petitioner believes that the high content of volcanic material in the soils is a significant contributory factor to the successful regional viticulture and pomology over the past 100 years. The United States Department of Agriculture, National Cooperative Soil Survey, has identified 11 soil series within the Lake Chelan viticultural area. Eight of these series consist of soils derived from volcanic glass, including ashy, cindery, pumiceous, glassy, vitrandic, medial, and amorphic soils. Only the Margerum and Dragoon series are silt loam, which is common on the Columbia Plateau. The petitioner explains that many agricultural soils on the Columbia Plateau are silt loam throughout the soil profile, and are unlike those with a high content of volcanic pumice and ash in the Lake Chelan area and Cascade Range. Also, the mineralogy of the Columbia Plateau basalt sediments, deposited as alluvium derived from basaltic lavas, includes neither quartz nor mica, which are commonly found in the sediments in the Lake Chelan Valley area. A sampling of soils taken by the petitioner across the Columbia Plateau shows that the dominant parent materials are loess and dunes and have an average content of only 12 percent volcanic glass. This is substantially different from the high glass content of soils in the viticultural area.
The Pasco and Umatilla Basins, to the south of the viticultural area, were the origins of most of the loess throughout the Columbia Plateau. Over the millennia the Lake Chelan Valley, outside the path of most of the wind transporting the loess, has received only minor deposits of loess. The petitioner asserts that the differences in soil between the Lake Chelan Valley and the Columbia Plateau impact infiltration and runoff of water, aeration of the soils, root penetration, and available water capacity.
