= Anton Maria Pirovano =

Italian sculptor

Anton Maria Pirovano (active 1720–1770) was an Italian sculptor, painter, and architect, active in a late baroque style, around Bergamo in the region of Lombardy.

== Biography ==
He first trained under his father, the sculptor Pier Paolo Pirovano. His father was born in Viganò, but moved in 1698 to Sforzatica, and in 1705 to Pignolo. Anton Maria also worked for some time in Milan with his father, sculpting reliefs for the cloister of San Paolo d’Argon, and in the restoration of the façade of the parish church of Solza. His major works were sculptures atop the facades of churches of San Rocco in Treviglio and the Beata Vergine dello Spasimo (Santa Lucia) in Bergamo. He also decorated the parish churches of Zanica, Brembate Sotto, Cologno al Serio, Treviolo, Osio Sotto, Verdellino, Fara d’Adda, Santa Grata inter Vites, Breno, Lesmo, and Rivolta d’Adda.
