= Columbia Gorge AVA =

Wine region in Oregon and Washington, United States

Coordinates: 45°44′01″N 121°35′27″W

Columbia Gorge
- Wine region
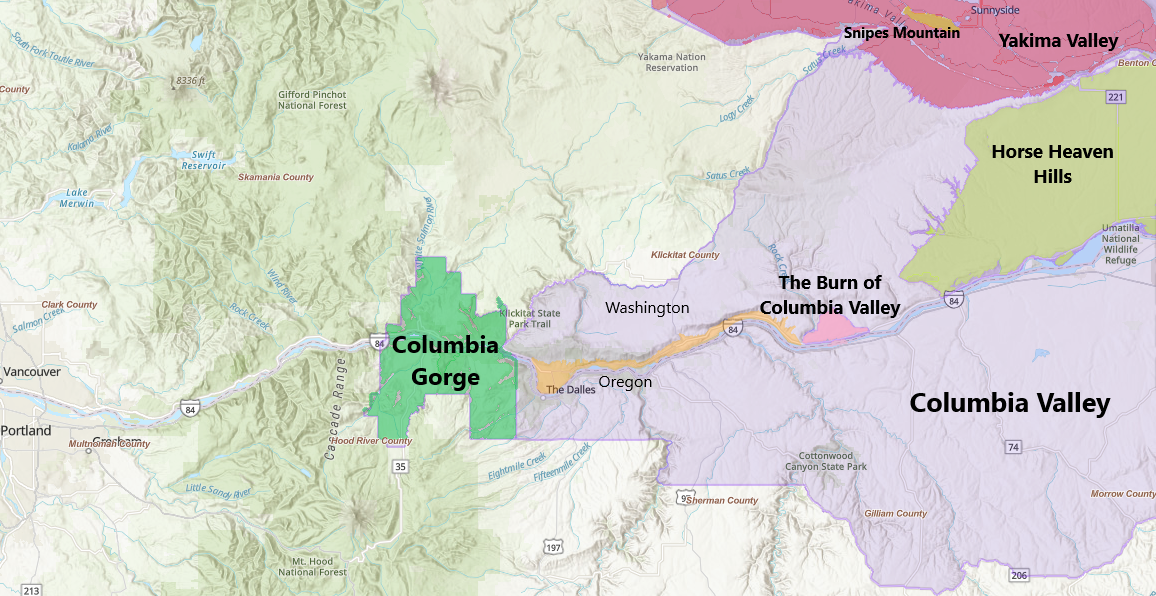
- Type: American Viticultural Area
- Year established: 2004
- Years of wine industry: 146
- Country: United States
- Part of: Washington, Oregon
- Other regions in Washington, Oregon: Columbia Valley AVA, Walla Walla Valley AVA
- Growing season: 110 to 160 days
- Climate region: Region III
- Heat units: 3,302 GDD units
- Precipitation (annual average): 18 to 30 inches (457–762 mm)
- Soil conditions: Silty loams
- Total area: 179,200 acres (280 sq mi)
- Size of planted vineyards: 1,300 acres (526 ha)
- No. of vineyards: 90+
- Grapes produced: Barbera, Cabernet Sauvignon, Chardonnay, Chenin blanc, Gewurztraminer, Lemberger, Merlot, Pinot blanc, Pinot gris, Pinot noir, Sangiovese, Sauvignon blanc, Syrah, Tempranillo, Viognier, Zinfandel
- No. of wineries: 50

Columbia Gorge is an American Viticultural Area (AVA) located on the 40-mile long (64 km) Columbia River Gorge landform along the Columbia River for 15 miles (24 km) between the south-central Washington and north-central Oregon state border. It was established as the nation's 152^{nd}, Washington's sixth and Oregon's seventh appellation on May 10, 2004 by the Alcohol and Tobacco Tax and Trade Bureau (TTB), Treasury after reviewing the petition submitted by Mark Wharry on behalf of the Columbia River Gorge Wine Growers Association (CGWA), proposing the viticultural area named "Columbia Gorge."

The 179,200-acre (280 sq mi) appellation is located about 60 miles (97 km) east of Portland, Oregon, encompassing Hood River, Oregon, and White Salmon, Washington, and bordered by B Z Corner, Washington, on the north; Lyle, Washington, on the east; Parkdale, Oregon, on the south; and Vinzenz Lausmann State Park, Oregon, on the west. The area lies due west with an adjacent border to the vast Columbia Valley viticultural area. Due to the significant gradations of climate and geography found in the gorge, the AVA exhibits a wide range of terroir in a relatively small region and is marketed as a "world of wine in 40 miles".

Columbia Gorge extends across the Hood River and Wasco counties in Oregon, and the Skamania and Klickitat counties in Washington. The region stretches from Hood River, Oregon and Underwood, Washington in the west, to Rowena, Oregon and Lyle, Washington in the east. It includes the river valleys of the Hood and Deschutes in Oregon, and the Klickitat and White Salmon in Washington.
As the AVA lies east of the summits of nearby Mount Hood and Mount Adams, it is in rain shadow of the Cascade volcanoes. The region is significantly drier than the Portland metropolitan area to the west. Annual precipitation ranges from 30 inches (762 mm) at the western end of the area, to only 18 inches (457 mm) in the east. Elevation in the region varies considerably, increasing as one travels from the Columbia River into the plateaus on either side, as the strong Columbia Gorge winds significantly influences the region's climate. This allows a wide variety of grapes to be grown in the Columbia Gorge.
The region has about 90+ vineyards, growing a wide variety of grapes, including Syrah, Pinot noir, Chardonnay, Gewürztraminer, Zinfandel, Cabernet Sauvignon, Pinot gris, Riesling, and Sangiovese.

== History ==
Lewis and Clark made the Columbia Gorge famous when they passed through on their way to the Pacific Ocean in 1805. Growers have raised grapes in the Columbia Gorge for over a century. In the 1880s, the Jewitt family, founders of the town of White Salmon, Washington, built terraces on a wide south-facing slope on the bluff above Bingen, Washington. They planted American vines that they had brought with them from Illinois. Also, the pioneering Balfour and Meress families brought grape cuttings to the Columbia Gorge. John Balfour, the youngest son of English Lord Balfour, planted grape vines in the early 1900s near the current location of Lyle, Washington. Leonis and Elizah Meress brought grape cuttings to the area from their native Adele Nord, a village in one of France's coldest regions. Some of the vinifera vines they planted are still alive and have withstood temperatures well below zero. Viticulture in the Columbia Gorge was renewed in the early 1960s when experimental plots were planted on the south facing slopes of Underwood Mountain. Later, commercial plots were planted under the direction of Washington State University. As of 2023, the Columbia Gorge Winegrowers Association (CGWA) comprises 90 or more vineyards and 50 wineries. Currently, 1,300 acres (526 ha) are under vine in the Columbia Gorge viticultural area with more being planted each year.

== Terroir ==
The Columbia Gorge viticultural area's boundary is based on a combination of topographic, soil and climatic factors that contrast with the nearby Columbia Valley and Willamette Valley viticultural areas. Much of the boundary line is the 2,000 feet (610 m) elevation line, which encloses lower elevations and flatter agricultural areas with loamy soils. Above the 2,000 feet (610 m) elevation boundary line the terrain becomes steeper and has gravelly soils more suitable for timber.

=== Topography ===
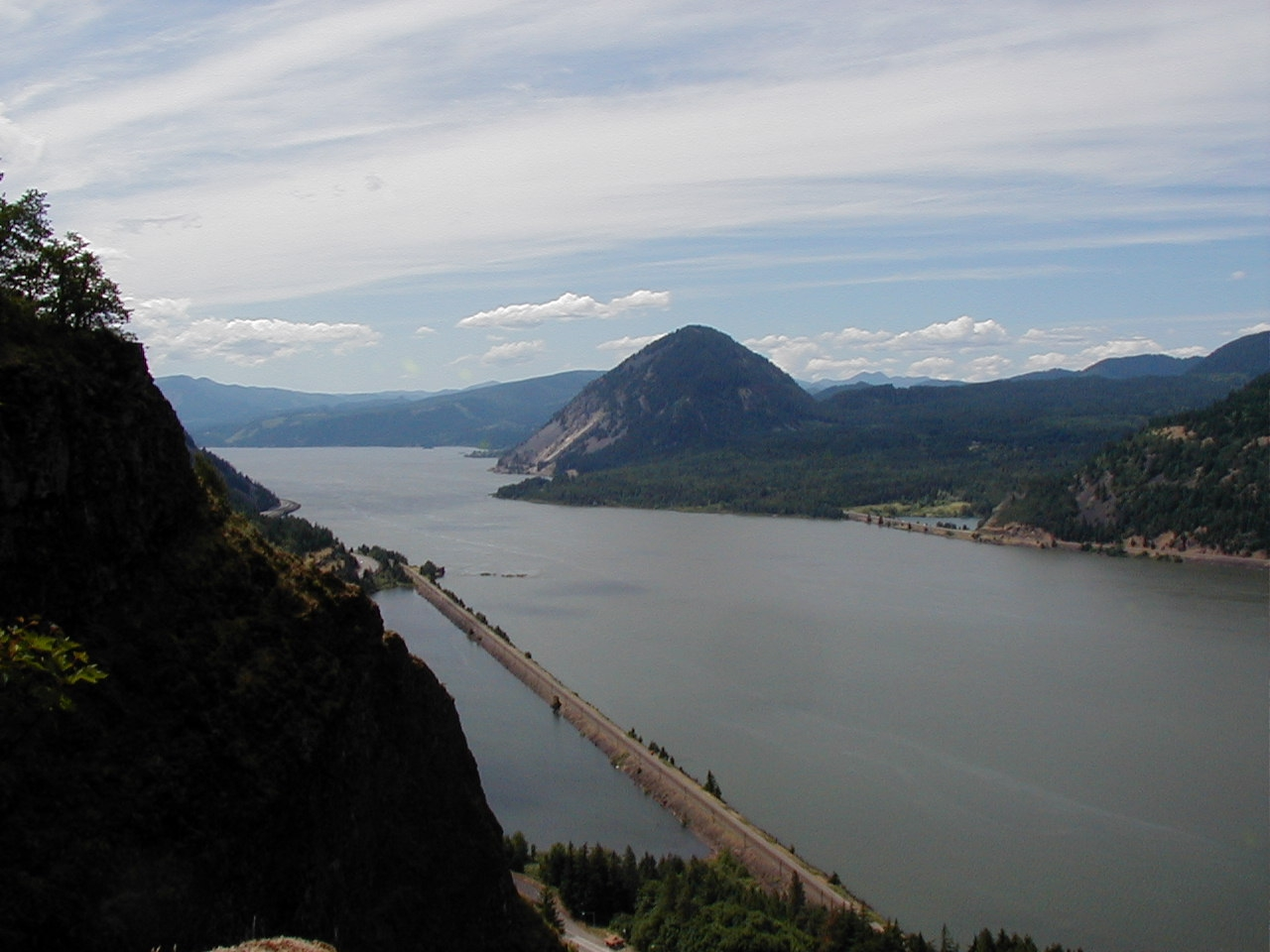
The Columbia River (shown here in Hood River County, Oregon) traverses through the Columbia Gorge AVA

The Columbia River, twisting and turning on a westbound course, carved the Columbia Gorge, with its sides of steep cliffs, into the terrain. These sides range from sheer rock faces, consisting of volcanic outcroppings of igneous and metamorphic rock, to gentle stair-step benchlands formed by prehistoric lava flows. These benchlands have deep soil and good sun exposure, making them desirable for vineyards. Through the narrow gap in the Cascade Mountains, the Gorge funnels the Pacific's moist marine air from the west and the drier inland air from the east, back and forth depending on the fluctuating air pressure. The Columbia Gorge viticultural area benefits from these prevailing winds, which moderate temperatures that otherwise might be warmer in the summer and cooler in the winter.

=== Climate ===
The Columbia Gorge appellation climate drastically changes and is distinguished by its proximity to the Cascade crest in the west and the persistent winds passing through the Gorge creating radically different microclimates. Utilizing the Amerine-Winkler method, Columbia Gorge has different cumulative heat summation during the grape growing season than nearby areas. To the west is a cooler, marine-influenced climate where it rains 36 inches (914 mm) per year; to the east it's a continental arid high desert climate with just 10 inches (254 mm) of annual rainfall. This extreme variance of climate means the area can successfully grow a wide range of classical varieties.

The wind's effect on viticulture is noted during the grapevine bud-break to fruit-set period, according to a 1982 article, "Influence of Windbreaks and Climatic Region on Diurnal Fluctuation of Leaf Water Potential, Stomatal Conductance, and Leaf Temperature of Grapevines" by Freeman, Kliewer, and Stern in the American Journal of Enological Viticulture (vol: 33, pp.233–236). The most-often observed consequences of the higher winds within the affected AVAs include a reduction in canopy size and density of grapes on the vines. Also, vines are less prone to disease, based on the wind's drying of wet plant surfaces on where fungal spores or bacteria can land. The volume of wind is also a key factor in determining the amount of irrigation needed for optimum vine growth. The USDA plant hardiness zones range from 7b to 8b.

==== Rainfall ====
Annual rainfall decreases approximately one inch per mile from west to east within the Columbia Gorge viticultural area from 36 inches (914 mm) on the west side of the Hood River, to 10 inches (254 mm) near its eastern boundary at Lyle, Washington. By comparison, west of the Columbia Gorge viticultural area boundary the Bonneville Dam averages 77.54 inches (1,969.52 mm) and Skamania, Washington, averages 85.49 inches (2,171.45 mm) of annual rainfall. To the east of the boundary line, The Dalles, Oregon, averages 14.52 inches (368.81 mm) and Yakima, Washington, averages 8.21 inches (208.53 mm) of rainfall annually.

==== Temperature ====
The average growing temperatures within the Columbia Gorge viticultural area range from 62 °F (17 °C) degrees (Appleton and Wind River) to 65 °F (18 °C) (Hood River, Oregon), as compared to 61 °F (16 °C) to the west in Skamania and 71.6 °F (22.0 °C) to the east in The Dalles. In general, grapes grown in this viticultural area are early varietals, such as Pinot Noir and Gewurztraminer, which require fewer high temperature days. By contrast, the Columbia Valley viticultural area is able to grow much later varieties, e.g., Merlot and Cabernet Sauvignon, due to significantly higher degree growing days.

=== Soils ===
Soil types within the boundaries of the Columbia Gorge viticultural area are silty loams, as opposed to the more gravelly soils found outside the area. As the valleys on both the Washington and Oregon sides of the area slope up to the surrounding hills, the terrain becomes much steeper, and the soil types change noticeably. Permeability of the silty loams found within the Columbia Gorge viticultural area is slow to moderate, and the available water capacity is high. Effective rooting depth is 60 inches (1,524 mm) or more. Soils include Chemawa, Underwood Loam, McGowen, Wyest Silt Loam, Van Horn, Parkdale Loam, and Oak Grove Loam series. By contrast, the soils immediately surrounding the Columbia Gorge viticultural area, both above the 2,000 feet (610 m) elevation line and eastward to the Columbia Valley, are generally gravelly with higher permeability. These soils typically support sloped timber areas at more than 2,000 feet (610 m) above sea level. Examples of soils outside the area are the Steeper McElroy, Undusk Gravelly Loam, Husum Gravelly Loam, Rock Outcrop, Bins-Bindle, Yallani, and Hesslan-Skyline series..

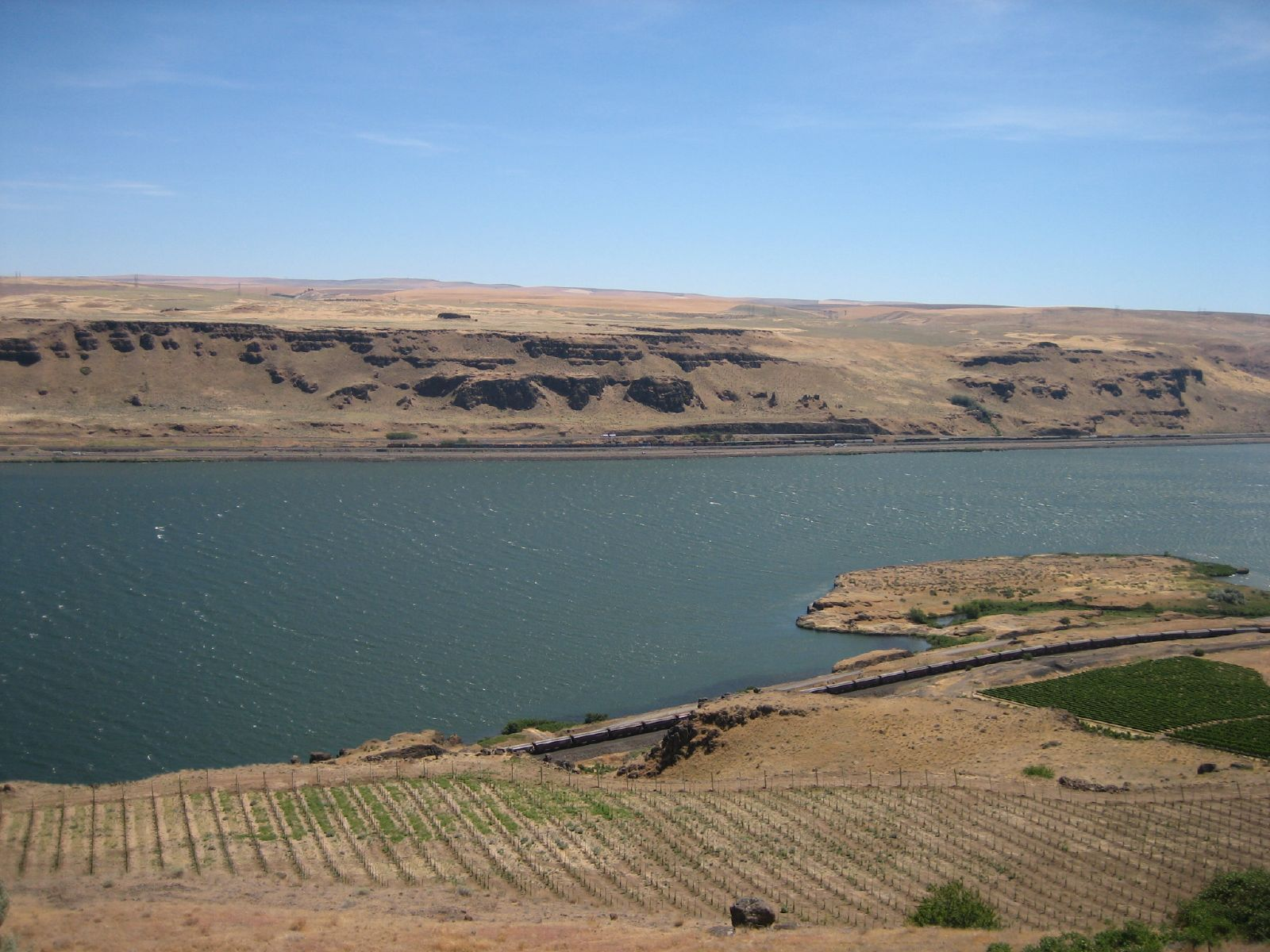
Columbia Gorge vineyards overlooking the Columbia River.

== Viticulture ==
The Columbia Gorge geography is unique where the Cascade Mountains are bisected by the Columbia River through a very narrow passage creating a natural wind funnel. The appellation land area straddles across the river as it traverses on the Washington-Oregon border. As a result, the topography produces different microclimates from west to east as annual rainfall decreases approximately one inch per mile. The western section of the appellation receives an average of 36 inches (914 mm) of rainfall annually and the eastern section a mere 10 inches (254 mm). The western vineyards have more of a maritime influenced climate, ideal for cooler climate grapes and eastern vineyards have a continental climate, better suited to warm weather varieties. Vineyards on both sides of the river share the terroir beneficial to the 1,300 acres (526 ha) under vine among 90+ vineyards which cultivate grapes that garnered the attention from regional vintners. On the Washington terraces, south-facing sloped vineyards receive the most sunshine and those closest to the mountains are among the few in the state that can be dry-farmed. These south-facing slopes represent the best aspect for viticulture in the Pacific Northwest due to the northerly latitude. The renown Celilo vineyard was particularly admired for its Chardonnay and Pinot Noir.
