= Goose Gap AVA =

Viticultural area in Washington, USA

Coordinates: 46°14′33″N 119°22′12″W

Goose Gap
- Wine region
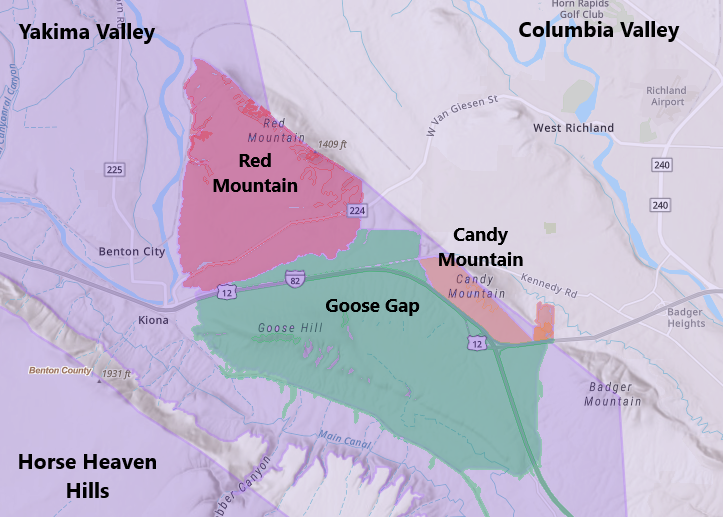
- Type: American Viticultural Area
- Year established: 2021
- Years of wine industry: 28
- Country: United States
- Part of: Washington, Columbia Valley AVA, Yakima Valley AVA, Benton County
- Other regions in Washington, Columbia Valley AVA, Yakima Valley AVA, Benton County: Candy Mountain AVA, Red Mountain AVA
- Growing season: 187 days
- Climate region: Region III
- Heat units: 3,350 GDD units
- Precipitation (annual average): 6 inches (152 mm)
- Soil conditions: Warden series, windblown silt and fine sand overlying Missoula Flood sediment
- Total area: 8,129 acres (13 sq mi)
- Size of planted vineyards: 1,800 acres (728 ha)
- No. of vineyards: 2
- Grapes produced: Cabernet Sauvignon, Chardonnay, Merlot, Syrah
- No. of wineries: 1

Goose Gap is an American Viticultural Area (AVA) in Washington, United States encompassing the local region surrounding Goose Mountain in Benton County between Kiona to the west, and Richland along the Columbia River to the east. It was established as the nation's 256^{th} and the state's nineteenth appellation on July 1, 2021 by the Alcohol and Tobacco Tax and Trade Bureau (TTB), Treasury after reviewing the petition submitted by geologist/vintner, Alan Busacca, on behalf of the Goose Gap Wine Grower's Association, proposing the viticultural area known as "Goose Gap."

The name refers to the saddle landform pass between Goose Mountain to the west and Badger and Candy Mountains to the east within the vast Columbia Valley. Both geographies are within its appellation boundaries which are named for being a common pathway for migratory waterfowl.
In 1998, the first grapevines were planted in the area by Arvid Monson. Within the approximately 8,129-acre (13 sq mi) viticultural area, there are two commercial vineyards cultivating 1,800 acres (728 ha) and only one winery. The primary varietals produced are Cabernet Sauvignon, Chardonnay, Merlot and Syrah.
The wine region is the fifth sub-appellation entirely within the Yakima Valley and the sixteenth in the expansive Columbia Valley sandwiched on a northwest–southeast axis between neighboring viticultural areas Red Mountain and the minute Candy Mountain.

== History ==
In 1998, Yakima native, renown grower, rancher and founder of Goose Ridge Winery, Arvid Monson, chose to plant grapes on the hills adjacent to Red Mountain with the consultation of Dr. Walter Clore, who is considered by many to be the "father" of the Washington wine industry. "Our family started farming in the Columbia Valley in the early 1900s and we always knew Goose Gap was a special site", said Bill Monson, President of Goose Ridge Estate Vineyards & Winery, which is currently the only winery within Goose Gap AVA. Dr. Clore noted Goose Gap's gradual, south-facing slopes and warm temperatures as excellent viticulture terroir. The Goose Ridge Estate Vineyard & Winery is the largest vineyard development in the lower Yakima Valley to be planted dominantly on Goose Gap's north and northeast slopes capitalizing on the unique and diverse qualities of the locale. TTB confirmed Dr. Clore's observations when it recognized the geology, soils, elevation, and slope direction as clearly unique to this region and established Goose Gap AVA. Goose Ridge Estate Vineyard & Winery produces quality vintages from the 16 varieties grown in the AVA highlighting Goose Gap in their portfolio of wines and spirits.

The establishment of the Goose Gap AVA allows vintners to use "Goose Gap", "Yakima Valley", and "Columbia Valley" as appellations of origin for wines made primarily from grapes grown within Goose Gap if the wines meet the eligibility requirements for the appellation. To qualify as an AVA, a wine grape-growing region must be distinguishable by features such as climate, soil, elevation and physical features. Since August 2, 2021, wineries may submit a Certificate of Label Approval (COLA) request to the TTB for a label using Goose Gap AVA as the appellation of origin. "Each AVA is several years in the making, so this is an exciting time for those who make wine from grapes grown within Goose Gap", said Steve Warner, President of the Washington State Wine Commission, "We're ready to start spreading the word about this great region!"

== Terroir ==
=== Topography ===
The distinguishing features of the Goose Gap AVA are its geology and soils. The appellation is part of a series of folded hills and valleys collectively known as the Yakima Fold Belt, a series of topographical folds (or wrinkles) raised from tectonic compression, which runs from the Beezley Hills in the north to the Horse Heaven Hills in the south. Goose Gap AVA comprises two geographic features with similar viticultural conditions: Goose Gap and the adjoining Goose Hill. Goose Gap and Goose Hill together form part of a single folded and faulted block of the Columbia River Basalt. Sometime between 10 and 15 million years ago, multiple lava flows poured out from the Yellowstone hotspot, then located in western Idaho. These lava flows covered large portions of Washington and Oregon on their way to the Pacific Ocean and are the cause of the underlying basalt of the region. In some areas, the basalt was 5,900 feet (1,800 m) thick.

Goose Gap is formed from a syncline, a down-folded arch in the bedrock that creates a saddle-like shape, whereas Goose Hill is formed from an anticline, an arch-like structure of basalt that bends upwards to form a ridge and slopes. Elevations range from 577 feet (176 m) above sea level along the southern boundary to 1,339 feet (408 m) at the top of Goose Mountain. Goose Gap and Goose Hill both have an east–west orientation, south and southwest slopes that are too steep for planting, and plantable north and northeast slopes. In contrast, the petition states that all of the ridges and hills in the region surrounding the AVA have a northwest–southeast orientation, plantable south and southwest slopes, and north and northeast slopes that are too steep for vineyards. Because vineyards in the Goose Gap AVA are planted on north-and northeast-facing slopes, they receive less solar radiation than nearby vineyards planted on south and southwest-facing slopes. As a result, grapes grown in the AVA typically ripen later than the same varietals grown in the neighboring Red Mountain to the northwest.

=== Soil ===
Five main soil series make up almost 95 percent of the soils in the Goose Gap: Warden, Shano, Kiona, Hezel, and Prosser. The Warden series soils, which make up 65 percent of the AVA, consist of wind-blown loess over layered or stratified silts and fine sands, and have rooting depths of 6 feet (2 m) or more with no hardpans or other root-restrictive layers. Shano soils constitute seven percent of the Goose Gap and are also formed from wind-blown loess and are deep soils with low levels of organic material. Kiona soils make up 9 percent of the AVA and are formed in loess and rubble from fractured basalt. Hezel soils make up seven percent of the AVA and are made of windblown sand over stratified silts and sands. Finally, Prosser soils make up five percent and derive from loess mixed with flood sediments. Prosser soils are generally shallow and overlay fractured basalt bedrock. In comparison, Warden soils are less common in the established Red Mountain AVA to the northwest, the Horse Heaven Hills AVA to the southwest, and in the established Yakima Valley AVA that encompasses Goose Gap. Additionally, Scooteney soils make up almost 11 percent of soils in the established Red Mountain AVA, and Ritzville soils make up almost 30 percent of the soils in the established Horse Heaven Hills AVA, yet both soil series are completely absent from Goose Gap AVA.

Finally, TTB has also determined that the Goose Gap will remain part of the established Yakima Valley AVA. The two AVAs share soils that are a combination of glacial-flood and windborne soils, including the Warden soil series, and rest on Columbia River basalt. However, Goose Gap is unique among the hills of the Yakima Valley AVA in that it has an east–west alignment and plantable north and northeast slopes. Additionally, a major soil series of the Yakima Valley AVA is the Scooteney-Starbuck soil association. However, within the Goose Gap AVA, Scooteney soils are absent, and Starbuck soils make up less than 2 percent of the soils.

=== Climate ===
The area shares the unusual terroirs in the state with neighboring Red and Candy Mountain AVAs where southwest facing slopes experience warmer temperatures and more sunlight hours than any other part of the Columbia Valley. The nighttime temperatures drop considerably, helping to preserve the acid levels within the grape At Benton City, the Yakima River flows past the area and provides a moderating effect on the temperature. Cool air from the northern elevations flowing to the lower river valley moves across the hillside vineyards and keeps the grapes from being overheated. This constant air movement prevents air settling and frost damage to the grapes The area has a desert climate with average annual rainfall of 6 inches (150 mm). During the growing season, daytime temperatures average 90 °F (32 °C) with nighttime temperatures dropping below 50 °F (10 °C). Vineyards rely on irrigation to supply water to the vines allowing viniters to optimize the growth cycle of their grapevines. The USDA plant hardiness zone is 7b.
