= Candy Mountain AVA =

Viticultural area in Washington, US

Coordinates: 46°15′08″N 119°20′36″W

Candy Mountain
- Wine region
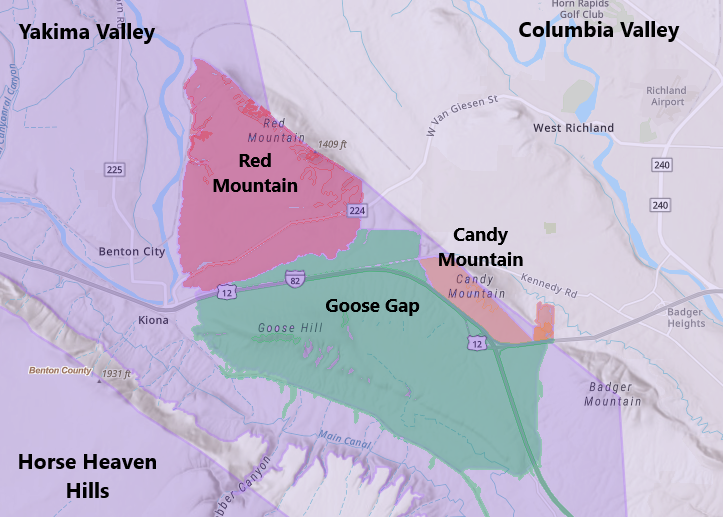
- Type: American Viticultural Area
- Year established: 2020
- Years of wine industry: 28
- Country: United States
- Part of: Washington, Columbia Valley AVA, Yakima Valley AVA, Benton County
- Other regions in Washington, Columbia Valley AVA, Yakima Valley AVA, Benton County: Goose Gap AVA, Red Mountain AVA
- Climate region: Region III
- Heat units: 3,601 GDD units
- Precipitation (annual average): 5 inches (127 mm)
- Soil conditions: Loess, windblown silt and sand, ice age flood sediment, underlying basalt bedrock
- Total area: 815 acres (1.3 sq mi)
- Size of planted vineyards: 110 acres (45 ha)
- No. of vineyards: 2
- Grapes produced: Cabernet Franc, Cabernet Sauvignon, Merlot, Sangiovese , Syrah
- No. of wineries: 1

Candy Mountain is an American Viticultural Area (AVA) located in Washington on the slopes surrounding Candy Mountain in Benton County southwest of the city of Richland along the Columbia River. It was established as the nation's 251^{st} and the state's sixteenth appellation on September 25, 2020 by the Alcohol and Tobacco Tax and Trade Bureau (TTB), Treasury after reviewing the petition submitted by Dr. Kevin R. Pogue, professor of geology at Whitman College, on behalf of the following local viticulture industry members: Ramer Holtan, who is developing a commercial wine grape vineyard on Candy Mountain; Premiere Columbia Partners LLC, owners of Candy Mountain Vineyard; and Paul and Vickie Kitzke, owners of Kitzke Cellars, proposing a viticultural area known as "Candy Mountain."

For wines to bear the "Candy Mountain AVA" label, at least 85% of the grapes used for production must be grown in the designated area, Candy Mountain is a fourth sub-appellation within the Yakima Valley and the thirteenth in the expansive Columbia Valley AVA adjacent to the eastern boundary of Goose Gap AVA and few miles southeast of Red Mountain AVA. The smallest wine region in the state at 815 acres (1.3 sq mi) currently has two commercial vineyards, Candy Mountain Vineyard and Kitzke Cellars, which cultivate approximately 54 acres (22 ha) with future expansions for 200 acres (81 ha).

== Terroir ==
=== Topography ===
The distinguishing features of the Candy Mountain AVA are its soils and topography. It is a segment of a series of four mountains in the area, which includes Red Mountain, Baker Mountain, and Badger Mountain, that are collectively referred to as "the rattles" due to their alignment with the larger Rattlesnake Mountain. Topography also distinguishes the appellation from the surrounding regions which is located on the southwest-facing slope of Candy Mountain. Within the wine region, elevations range from 640 to 1,320 feet (195–402 m) with slope angles moderately ranging from 2 to 20 degrees. Gentle slopes facilitate mechanized vineyard maintenance and harvest. A south-facing slope aspect increases the amount per unit area of solar radiation that reaches the surface and promotes photosynthesis in the grape vines, as well as grape development and maturation. By contrast, the valley floor surrounding both the entire Candy Mountain and the AVA is essentially flat, with slope angles less than 2 degrees, and is susceptible to cold air pooling and the associated frosts and freezes. Additionally, much of the land immediately surrounding the appellation is a valley floor with elevations below 640 feet (195 m). The exception is the northeastern side of Candy Mountain, which has similar elevations to the AVA but were excluded due to northeasterly slope aspect and steep slope angles of up to 60 degrees.

=== Soil ===
The soils of Candy Mountain are developed from wind-deposited silt (loess) and fine sand overlying sediment. The sediment is a mixture of gravel and sand that was derived directly from surging ice-age Missoula Flood waters and also includes silt and fine sand that settled out of suspension when the flood waters pooled behind downstream topographic restrictions that define Columbia Valley soils. The loess and sediment, in turn, both overlay basalt bedrock. The thickness of the flood-water sediment within the Candy Mountain AVA gradually decreases as one moves up the mountain, and the sediment is not found within the upper 70 feet (21 m) of the appellation. By contrast, the regions to the north, south, and west of the mountain and Candy Mountain are at lower elevations and, therefore, have thicker accumulations of flood sediments in their soils. According to the petition, the soils of the AVA have an effect on viticulture. The soils are fairly loose, which allows for root expansion. The soils also do not have a large water holding capacity, meaning that vineyard owners must monitor soil moisture carefully to ensure the vines have adequate access to water. Finally, the thin soils allow roots to come into contact with the underlying basalt bedrock, which is composed of calcium-rich feldspars and other minerals that are rich in iron and magnesium, such as pyroxene and olivine. The petition states that these minerals and nutrients are only present in the bedrock, so vines planted in the surrounding regions where the soil is thicker do not have the same access to these elements as vines planted within the AVA.

=== Climate ===
Candy Mountain lies four miles (6 km) southeast of Red Mountain and borders Goose Gap sharing similar terroir where southwest facing slopes experience warmer temperatures and more sunlight hours than any other part of the Columbia Valley. Like Red Mountain, it also has higher winds relative to the surrounding area. Temperatures on Red Mountain tend to be hotter during the growing season than those in other areas of the Yakima Valley viticultural area. The nighttime temperatures drop considerably, helping to preserve the acid levels within the grape. To support this observation, the Red Mountain petition submitted temperature data gathered from weather stations in the Washington Public Agriculture Weather System administered by Washington State University. Data was compared from the Benton City, Sunnyside, Buena, and Gleed weather stations, all located in the Yakima Valley viticultural area. The Benton City station is located on Red Mountain within its viticultural area. A comparison of average annual air temperatures for the years 1995 through 1999 shows that the Benton City station consistently had the warmest temperatures. The average temperature difference between Benton City and Gleed, the coolest site, ranged from 3.92 to 5.61 °F (−16 to −15 °C). The petitioner stated that the difference of only a few degrees over the course of a growing season can produce dramatic results on the enological characteristics of wine. He further stated that Red Mountain is typically the first grape growing area in Washington State to harvest grapes because of its warmer temperatures. According to the petitioner, the warmer temperatures also help to produce fully mature, ripe grapes with exceptional balance that differ substantially in quality from those of other growing areas in the state.

At Benton City, the Yakima River flows past the area and provides a moderating effect on the temperature. Cool air from the northern elevations flowing to the lower river valley moves across the hillside vineyards and keeps the grapes from being overheated. This constant air movement prevents air settling and frost damage to the grapes. The area has a desert climate with average annual rainfall of 5 inches (130 mm). During the growing season, daytime temperatures average 90 °F (32 °C) with nighttime temperatures dropping below 50 °F (10 °C). Vineyards rely on irrigation to supply water to the vines allowing viniters to optimize the growth cycle of their grapevines. The USDA plant hardiness zone is 7b.

== Viticulture Industry ==
The minute 815-acre (1.3 sq mi) viticultural area began with two producing commercial vineyards, Candy Mountain Vineyards and Kitzke Cellars cultivating approximately 54 acres (22 ha). Additionally, Mr. Holtan secured long-term leases from the Washington Department of Natural Resources to cultivate additional 200 acres (81 ha) of vineyards. A copy of the lease was included in the petition as evidence of Mr. Holtan's intent to grow wine grapes. Currently, Kitzke Cellars is the only winery in the appellation, although the petition noted that other Washington wineries source from Candy Mountain grapes.
