= Kevin Pogue =

American geologist

Kevin Pogue is a professor of geology at Whitman College in Walla Walla, Washington, known for his expertise on terroir for winegrape production, a specialty in which he has been termed a "leading global expert". He works both as an academic geologist, and as a consultant for grape farmers and land investors. The New York Times said "[t]he importance of the work of Dr. Pogue...signals the increasing maturity and seriousness of the Washington wine industry. In 2018, Dr. Pogue was the recipient of the Walter Clore Honorarium from the Washington State Wine Commission, for his service as an "ambassador, mentor, and champion of Washington Wines". Dr. Pogue authored the entry for Washington State in the 5th Edition (2023) of the Oxford Companion to Wine.

== Early life and education ==
Pogue is from Lexington, Kentucky. He received a B.S. in geology from the University of Kentucky, and an M.S. in geology from Idaho State University. He received a doctorate in geology from Oregon State University.

== The Rocks District of Milton-Freewater AVA ==
In 2013–2014, Pogue did geological research for, and was the petitioner for, the first sub-appellation of the Walla Walla Valley AVA to be called The Rocks District of Milton–Freewater American Viticultural Area (The Rocks AVA).

== Candy Mountain AVA ==
Pogue is the author of the petition that created the Candy Mountain American Viticultural Area in September 2020. Candy Mountain is a sub-appellation of both the Yakima Valley and Columbia Valley AVAs.

== White Bluffs AVA ==
Pogue is the author of the petition that created White Bluffs American Viticultural Area in June 2021. White Bluffs is a sub-appellation of the Columbia Valley AVA.

== Rocky Reach AVA ==
Pogue is the author of the petition that created Rocky Reach American Viticultural Area in July 2022. Rocky Reach is a sub-appellation of the Columbia Valley AVA.

== Beverly, Washington AVA ==
Pogue is the author of the petition that created the Beverly, Washington American Viticultural Area in October 2024. Beverly, Washington is a sub-appellation of the Columbia Valley AVA.

== Columbia Hills AVA ==
Pogue is the author of the petition that created the Columbia Hills American Viticultural Area in August 2026. Columbia Hills is a sub-appellation of the Columbia Valley AVA.

== Rock climbing ==
Pogue has been a prolific developer of rock climbing routes, particularly in the Pacific Northwest. He began climbing in 1975 in the Red River Gorge in eastern Kentucky, an hour drive east of his home in Lexington. He made early ascents of many traditional climbing routes and participated in several traditional first free ascents with his primary partner, Ed Pearsall, whom he encouraged to write the Red River Gorge's second climbing guidebook. After moving to Idaho in 1981, Pogue climbed extensively in the City of Rocks. While climbing at the City of Rocks, he began to develop bolt-protected sport climbing routes with his ascent of Conceptual Reality on the Gallstone in 1985. Since that time Pogue has developed many very popular routes in the City of Rocks and adjoining Castle Rocks State Park, including Theater of Shadows, Sinocranium, Big Time, and Mantle Dynamics. On visits to his family in Lexington, Pogue returned to the Red River Gorge and established sport routes including Creature Feature and Pogue Ethics. After moving to Oregon in the mid-1980's, Pogue climbed often at Smith Rock State Park, where he established the climbs Helium Woman and Captain Xenolith in the Dihedrals area. After moving to Washington in 1990 Pogue discovered the basalt columns of Frenchman Coulee near Vantage. He was a pioneer in the development of sport climbing at Frenchman Coulee where he eventually established 38 routes, mostly on the Sunshine Wall, that include Ride'em Cowboy, Vantage Point, and Hakuna Matata. He eventually discovered the andesite cliffs of Spring Mountain, in the Blue Mountains, close to his home in Walla Walla. During the 1990s Pogue established 50 routes at Spring Mountain. Pogue has also developed over 20 routes at an area known as The Dikes in the Blue Mountains near Dayton, Washington, and has contributed extensively to the development of climbing routes at Wallula Gap on the Columbia River. During his travels, Pogue also managed to establish one, now popular route on the Magic Bus formation in Red Rocks called Neon Sunset.

== Himalayan geology ==
Pogue conducted National Science Foundation Research-funded geologic research in the Himalayan foothills of northern Pakistan from 1986 to 1998. This research, in collaboration with the Geological Survey of Pakistan and Peshawar University, focused on the Peshawar Basin, southern Swat and nearby tribal areas. He primarily studied the structure and stratigraphy of the rocks that are transitional from the sedimentary foreland fold-and-thrust belt to the metamorphic hinterland. His research established a stratigraphic and structural framework for this region that allowed it be correlated with the tectonostratigraphic subdivisions of the eastern and central Himalaya of Nepal and India. Pogue's research also led to the discovery of the first Ordovician rocks in Pakistan and a major episode of rifting during the Late Paleozoic.

== Geology of the City of Rocks National Reserve and Castle Rocks State Park ==
During 2000 to 2002, Pogue conducted Keck Geology Consortium-funded geological research in the granitic landscapes of southern Idaho's Albion Range. This research led to the publication, by the Idaho Geological Survey, of the book "Etched in Stone: The Geology of City of Rocks National Reserve and Castle Rocks State Park" and the establishment of the geology interpretive trail at City of Rocks National Reserve.
