= Anita G. Harris =

American geologist (1937–2014)

- Born: Anita Gloria Fishman; July 10, 1937; Brooklyn, New York, U.S.
- Died: July 12, 2014 (age 77); Florida, U.S.
- Other name: Anita G. Epstein
- Occupations: Geologist, paleontologist, mapmaker
- Employer: United States Geological Survey
- Notable work: Conodont Alteration Index

Anita Gloria Fishman Harris Epstein (July 10, 1937 – July 12, 2014) was an American geologist, paleontologist, and mapmaker. She devised the Conodont Alteration Index, a method of determining the heat exposure of buried rock, by analyzing conodont fossils. Her work, which had applications for the oil industry, was detailed in John McPhee's In Suspect Terrain (1983).

== Early life and education ==
Anita Fishman was born in Brooklyn, New York, the daughter of Harry Fishman (also known as Herschel Litwak or Harry Block) and Harriet Kirschberg Fishman. Her father and her maternal grandparents were all born in Russia; her father owned a trucking company and her mother was a legal secretary. She graduated from Brooklyn College, and earned a master's degree at Indiana University. She completed doctoral studies at Ohio State University in 1969, with a dissertation titled "Stratigraphy of Uppermost Silurian and Lowermost Devonian Rocks and the Conodont Fauna of the Coeymans Formation and its Correlatives in Northeastern Pennsylvania, New Jersey, and Southeasternmost New York" (1970).

== Career ==
Harris worked for the United States Geological Survey (USGS) as a mapmaker and map editor, and later as a research scientist. She invented the Conodont Alteration Index, a means of determining heat exposure in buried rock, with applications in the oil industry. "Rocks are the record of events that took place at the time they formed. They are books. They have a different vocabulary, a different alphabet, but you learn how to read them," she explained to John McPhee, for his book In Suspect Terrain (1983). She was also featured on an episode of the children's science program, 3-2-1 Contact. She received a Meritorious Service Award from the U.S. Department of the Interior, and was the first woman to win the Pander Society Medal. During two sabbaticals from the USGS, she taught at Case Western Reserve University and Duke University as a visiting professor. She official retired from the USGS in 1999, but continued working on USGS projects, including four summers in Denver.

== Publications and technical reports ==
Harris published dozens of scholarly papers and technical reports, in journals including Geological Survey Research, SEPM Special Publications, AAPG Bulletin, Geological Society of America Bulletin, Journal of South American Earth Sciences, and Economic Geology.

- "The Shawangunk Formation (Upper Ordovician(?) to Middle Silurian) in eastern Pennsylvania" (1972, with J. B. Epstein)
- "Early Ordovician North Atlantic province conodonts in eastern Pennsylvania" (1972, with J. B. Epstein and Stig M. Bergström)
- "Significance of Lower Ordovician exotic blocks in the Hamburg klippe, eastern Pennsylvania" (1972, with J. B. Epstein and Stig M. Bergström)
- "Conodont color alteration: An index to organic metamorphism" (1977, with J. B. Epstein and L. D. Harris)
- "Oil and gas data from Paleozoic rocks in the Appalachian Basin: maps for assessing hydrocarbon potential and thermal maturity (conodont color-alteration isograds and overburden isopachs)" (1978, with J. B. Epstein and L. D. Harris)
- "Conodont color alteration, an organo-mineral metamorphic index, and its application to Appalachian Basin Geology" (1979)
- "Evaluation of Southern Eastern Overthrust Belt Beneath Blue Ridge-Piedmont Thrust" (1981, with L D. Harris, Wallace De Witt Jr., and Kenneth C. Bayer)
- "Conodont-Based Thermal Maturation of Paleozoic Rocks in Arizona" (1984, with Bruce Wardlaw)
- "Conodont color and textural alteration: An index to regional metamorphism, contact metamorphism, and hydrothermal alteration" (1987, with Vivian A. Rejebian and J. Stephen Huebner)
- "Mechanical and chemical techniques for separating microfossils from rock, sediment and residue matrix" (1989, with Walter Sweet)
- "Paleozoic and Mesozoic stratigraphy of the Peshawar basin, Pakistan: Correlations and implications" (1992, with Kevin R. Pogue, Bruce R. Wardlaw, and Ahmad Hussain)
- "Depositional Framework and Regional Correlation of Pre-Carboniferous Metacarbonate Rocks of the Snowden Mountain Area, Central Brooks Range, Northern Alaska" (1994, with Julie A. Dumoulin)
- "Correlation of Ordovician rocks of northern Alaska" (1995, with Julie A. Dumoulin, John E. Repetski, and Claire Carter)
- "Reinterpretation of the stratigraphy and structure of the Rancho Las Norias area, central Sonora, Mexico" (2003, with William R. Page, Forrest G. Poole, and John E. Repetski)
- "Depositional Settings, Correlation, and Age of Carboniferous Rocks in the Western Brooks Range, Alaska" (2004, with Julie A. Dumoulin, Charles D. Blome, and Lorne E. Young)
- "Thermal Maturity Patterns (CAI and %Ro) in Upper Ordovician and Devonian Rocks of the Appalachian Basin: A Major Revision of USGS Map I–917–E Using New Subsurface Collections" (2008, with J. E. Repetski, R. T. Ryder, D. J. Weary and Michael H. Trippi)
- "Carbonate rocks of the Seward Peninsula, Alaska: Their correlation and paleogeographic significance" (2014, with Julie A. Dumoulin and John E. Repetski)

== Personal life ==
Anita Fishman married fellow geologist Jack Burton Epstein in 1958. They had a daughter, Laura, and divorced in 1976. Anita Epstein married her USGS colleague Leonard Dorreen Harris by 1978. He died in 1982. She had Alzheimer's disease in her last years, and died in 2014, at the age of 77. She was posthumously recognized with the 2015 Harrison Schmitt Award by the American Association of Petroleum Geologists.
