= Force Majeure Vineyards =

Wine estate located in Washington and Oregon

Force Majeure Winery
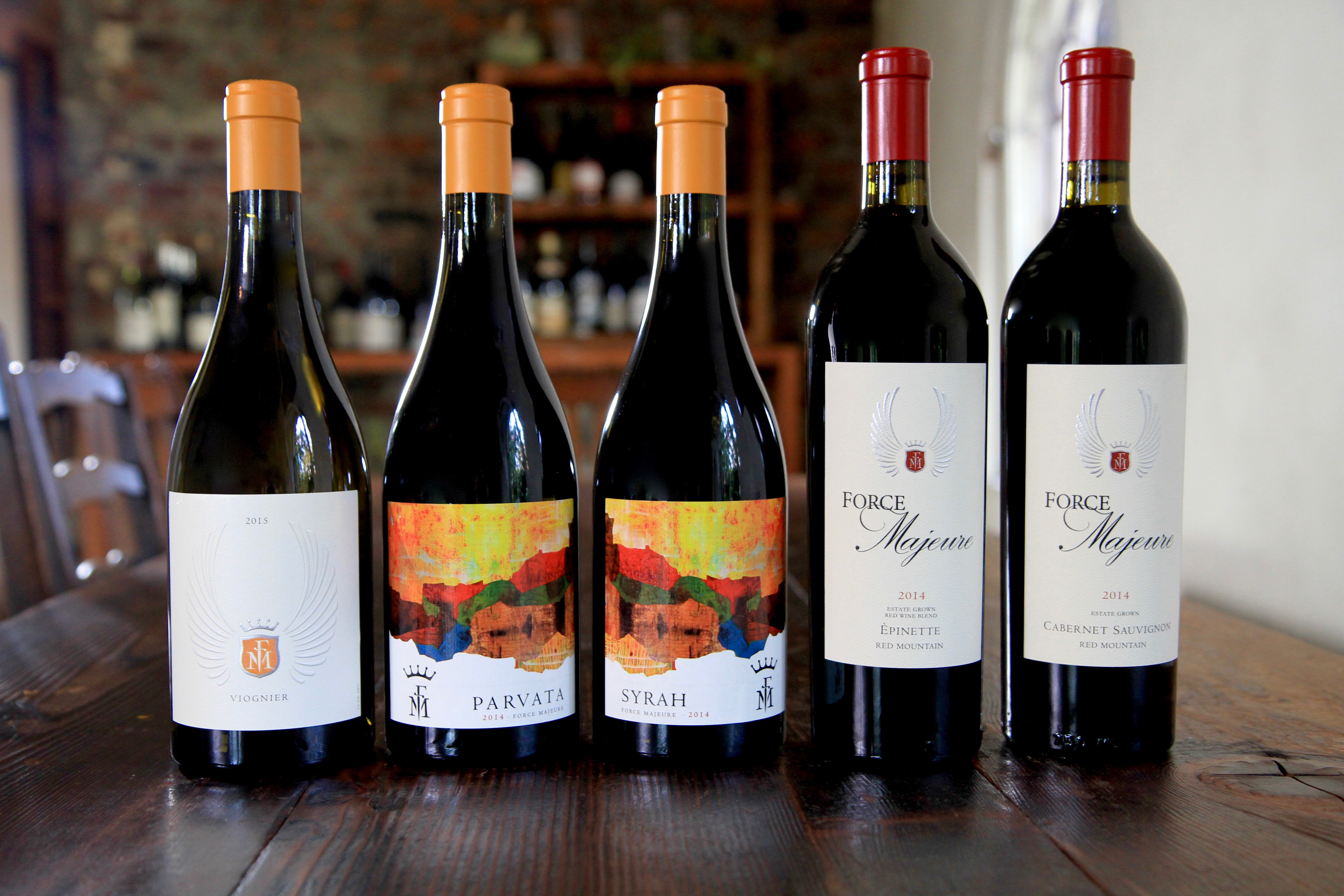
- Force Majeure wines
- Location: Washington/Oregon, USA
- Appellation: Red Mountain AVA / Walla Walla Valley AVA
- Formerly: Grand Reve Vintners
- Other labels: Parabellum
- Founded: 2004
- First vintage: 2004
- Key people: Paul McBride, Founder & Proprietor; Ryan Johnson, Co-Founder; Damon Lalonde, Vineyard Manager; Louis Skinner, Winemaker
- Cases/yr: < 3,000
- Known for: Syrah, Parvata, Cabernet Sauvignon, Épinette
- Varietals: Cabernet Sauvignon, Merlot, Cabernet Franc, Syrah, Grenache, Mourvèdre, Viognier, Petit Verdot, Cinsault, Counoise
- Distribution: Limited
- Tasting: Not available for tastings
- Website: www.fm-wine.com

Force Majeure is a Washington/Oregon wine estate, specializing in Syrah, Cabernet Sauvignon as well as other Bordeaux and Rhone-inspired blends. The brand was founded in 2004 (originally as "Grand Reve Vintners"), and beginning with that vintage began the "Collaboration Series" of wines made by some of Washington's top winemakers, using fruit from Red Mountain's Ciel du Cheval vineyard.

Force Majeure wines have received critical acclaim from influential wine critic Robert Parker's publication The Wine Advocate. Currently, Force Majeure holds the highest score ever given to a Washington Cabernet Sauvignon by the Wine Spectator (97 points).

Force Majeure purchased land for an estate vineyard within Washington's famed Red Mountain AVA, and initially developed the site in 2006–2007. In June 2014, they discontinued the Collaboration Series to focus on the estate vineyard and winemaking.

== Vineyards ==
Force Majeure holds a 40-acre site in Washington state's Red Mountain AVA, about half of which is planted to vines. Development started in 2006, and is ongoing. Force Majeure's Red Mountain vineyard was the first hillside vineyard of its kind in Washington state, planted with gobelet-trained Syrah as found in the northern Rhône. The hillside is steep, and rises in elevation from 950 to 1230 feet, on a piece of land that includes 9 distinct soil types due in part to the Missoula Floods. The soils are diverse and well drained, ranging from deep Warden to very rocky Kiona soils. Calcium carbonate, a chief component of limestone, is present in much of the vineyard. Varietals grown include Cabernet Sauvignon, Cabernet Franc, Merlot, Petit Verdot, Syrah, Grenache, Cinsault, Counoise and Mourvèdre. Due to the diversity of the soils in the vineyard, vine aspect, exposure and other factors, Force Majeure employs a diverse set of vine training systems, varietals and clonal selections.
In 2018, Force Majeure acquired two additional vineyards, both on the Oregon side of the Walla Walla Valley. At the same time, they also built a new winemaking facility and added a by-appointment tasting salon. The Walla Walla Valley vineyard that is adjacent to the winery was planted in the late 1990s to Syrah, Cabernet and a small parcel of Merlot. The first vintage of Cabernet from this site, the 2018 (made by Todd Alexander), received 100 points from wine writer Jeb Dunnuck | url=http://www.jebdunnuck.com and was the second 100-point wine for this winery and winemaker.

The Washington Wine Report has called Force Majeure Vineyard one of Washington's "most compelling (vineyard) sites", and Jeb Dunnuck of Robert Parker's Wine Advocate has named it as "one of the top estates in Washington." Harvey Steiman of Wine Spectator magazine has written that Force Majeure has "established itself in the top tier of Washington wineries."

== Production ==
Current wines in the estate lineup include:
Parvata – a Mourvèdre-dominant Rhône varietal blend
Syrah
Cabernet Sauvignon
Cabernet France
Grenache
Épinette – a blend of predominantly Merlot and Cabernet Franc
Viognier
