= Ciel du Cheval =

Grape-growing estate in Washington, US

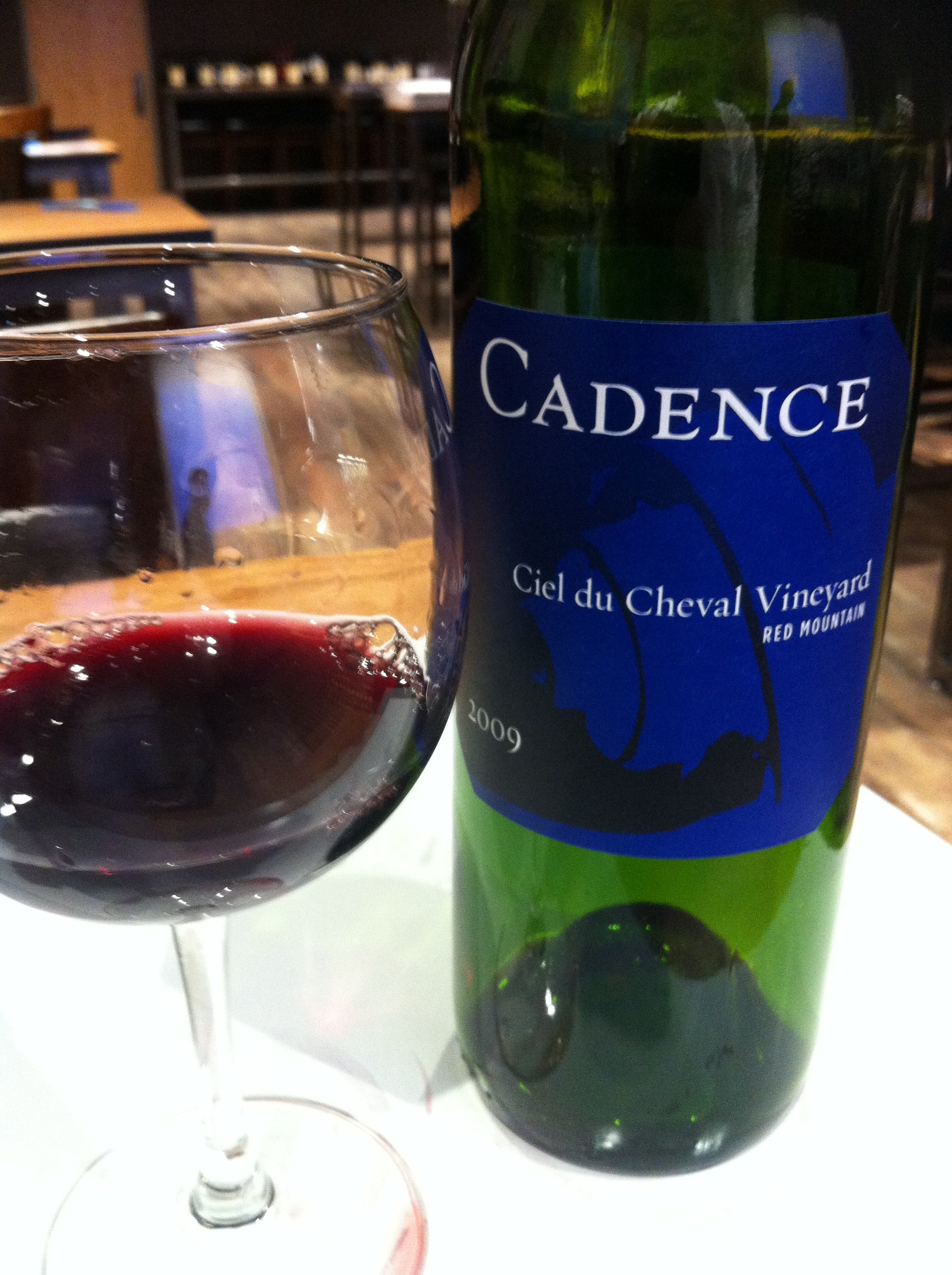
A wine from Ciel du Cheval vineyard on Red Mountain.

Ciel du Cheval (French for "horse's heaven") is a grape-growing estate located in the center of Red Mountain AVA. Paul Gregutt, wine writer for the Seattle Times and Wine Enthusiast, lists Ciel du Cheval as one of the "top twenty" vineyards in the entire state. Ciel's grapes are used by several of the 'A-list' wineries in Washington, according to Gregutt.
