= Conodont Alteration Index =

The Conodont Alteration Index (CAI) is used to estimate the maximum temperature reached by a sedimentary rock using thermal alteration of conodont fossils. Conodonts in fossiliferous carbonates are prepared by dissolving the matrix with weak acid, since the conodonts are composed of apatite and thus do not dissolve as readily as carbonate. The fossils are then compared to the index under a microscope. The index was first developed by Anita Epstein and colleagues at the United States Geological Survey.

The CAI ranges from 1 to 6, as follows:

CAI	Approximate conodont color	Temperature range (Celsius)
1	Pale brown	<50°-80°
2	Dark brown	60°-140°
3	Dark grey-brown	110°-200°
4	Dark grey	190°-300°
5	Black	300°-480°
6	Pale grey to white	360°-550°

The CAI is commonly used by paleontologists due to its ease of measurement and the abundance of Conodonta throughout marine carbonates of the Paleozoic. However, the organism disappears from the fossil record after the Triassic period, so the CAI is not available to analyze rocks younger than 200 million years. Additionally, the index can be positively skewed in regions of hydrothermal alteration.

== See also ==
- Foraminiferal Colouration Index (FCI)
