= Foraminiferal Colouration Index =

The Foraminiferal Colouration Index (FCI) is a tool for assessing the thermal alteration of organic matter buried in sedimentary rock. It uses temperature-controlled colour changes in the organic cement of agglutinated foraminifera (microfossils) to estimate thermal alteration. The method is empirical and based on determination of colour by visual comparison of fossil specimens to the Geological Society of America Rock-Color Chart (Munsell colour system) under a binocular microscope.

The FCI values 0 to 10 are indicated below:

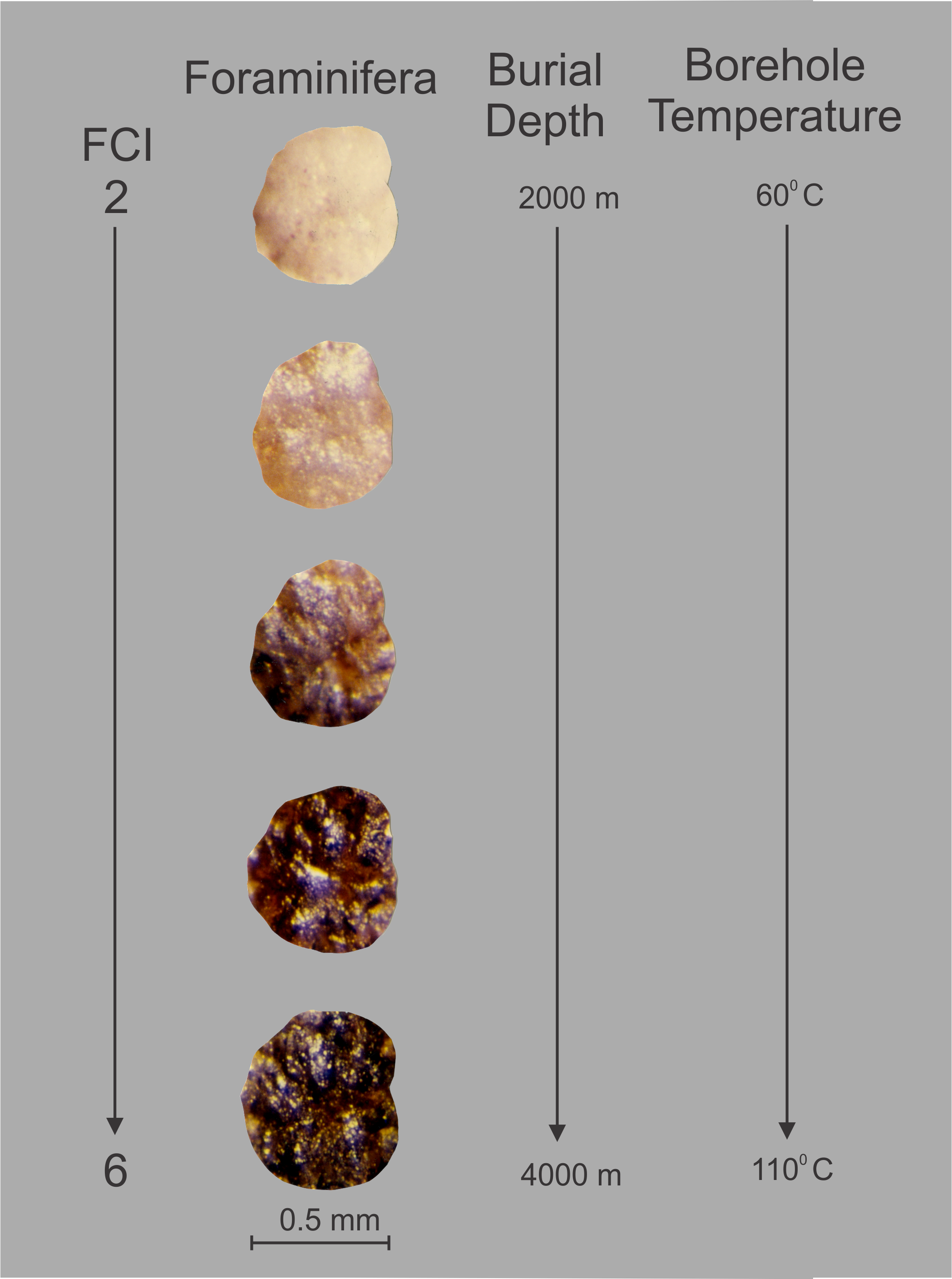
Foraminiferal Colouration Index (FCI) - Example of thermal alteration colours (FCI 2 - 6) in agglutinated foraminifera from an oil well.

FCI	Munsell Notation	Colour Description
0	7.5YR6/6	reddish yellow
1	10YR8/1, 10YR8/2	white
2	10YR6/1, 10YR7/2	light grey
3	10YR5/1, 10YR6/2	light brownish grey to grey
4	10YR4/1, 10YR5/2	grey to greyish brown
5	10YR3/1, 10YR/4/2	dark grey to dark greyish brown
6	10YR2/1, 10YR3/2	very dark grey to very dark greyish brown
7	10YR2/1, 10YR2/2	very dark brown to brownish black
8	10YR2/1, N2/0	very brownish black
9	N2/0	black (partially translucent)
10	N2/0	black

Agglutinated foraminifera have a long geological history spanning the Paleozoic, Mesozoic, and Cenozoic. The FCI has many potential applications especially in the analysis of samples from hydrocarbon exploration wells. Significant colour changes (FCI 2 to 6) occur through a temperature range of ~60 °C to ~110 °C. The FCI is therefore an indicator of temperatures required to initiate petroleum generation (oil window). The onset of oil generation correlates approximately to FCI 5–6.

Raman spectroscopy (an analytical tool for fingerprinting molecules) has confirmed that organic cement is present in fossil agglutinated foraminifera. Raman spectroscopy and the FCI can be used to estimate thermal maturity and, therefore, assess thermal conditions necessary for hydrocarbon generation.

The FCI methodology is similar to the Conodont Alteration Index (CAI), but the colour/temperature relationships differ in that FCI is more sensitive to colour change at lower temperatures.
