= Red Mountain AVA =

Viticultural area in Washington, USA

Coordinates: 46°15′56″N 119°26′57″W

Red Mountain
- Wine region
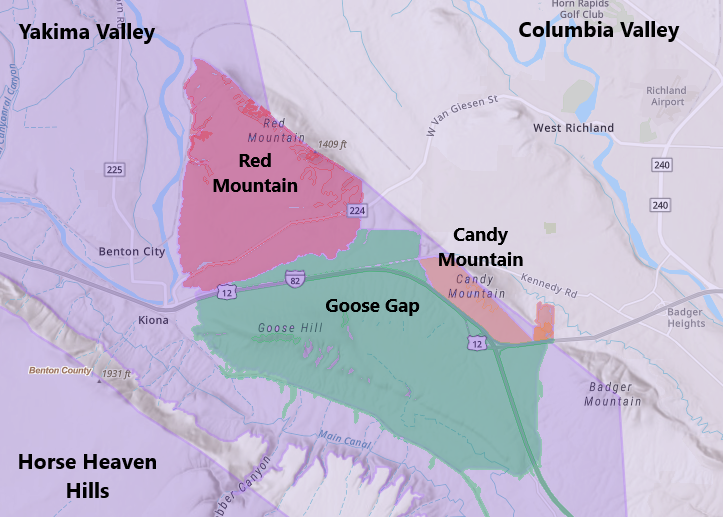
- Type: American Viticultural Area
- Year established: 2001
- Country: United States
- Part of: Columbia Valley AVA, Washington, Yakima Valley AVA
- Other regions in Columbia Valley AVA, Washington, Yakima Valley AVA: Candy Mountain AVA, Goose Gap AVA, Rattlesnake Hills AVA, Snipes Mountain AVA
- Growing season: 187 days
- Climate region: Region III
- Heat units: 3,370 GDD units
- Precipitation (annual average): 6.8 inches (173 mm)
- Soil conditions: Warden & Scooteney silt loam, Hezel loamy fine sand and Kiona very stony silt loam
- Total area: 4,040 acres (6 sq mi)
- Size of planted vineyards: 2,382 acres (964 ha)
- No. of vineyards: 27
- Grapes produced: Cabernet Franc, Cabernet Sauvignon, Chardonnay, Counoise, Gewurztraminer, Lemberger, Malbec, Merlot, Mourvedre, Nebbiolo, Petit Verdot, Pinot gris, Riesling, Roussanne, Sauvignon blanc, Semillon, Syrah, Viognier
- No. of wineries: more than 15

Red Mountain is an American Viticultural Area (AVA) located surrounding Red Mountain in Benton County, Washington between Benton City and the City of West Richland. It was established as the nation's 141st and the state's fifth appellation on April 10, 2001 by the Bureau of Alcohol, Tobacco and Firearms (ATF), Treasury after reviewing the petition submitted by Lorne Jacobson of Hedges Cellars proposing a viticultural area known as "Red Mountain."
The small 4,040-acre (6 sq mi) wine region was the initial sub-appellation entirely within the Yakima Valley and the third wine region established within the expansive Columbia Valley. As of 2025, there is more than 2,382 acres (964 ha) being cultivated with primarily red varietals including Cabernet Sauvignon, Merlot, Sangiovese, Cabernet Franc and Syrah. The reputation of the Red Mountain's wines has brought worldwide attention and acclaim for producing some of the most desired Washington State vintages.

== History ==
In the 1970s, John Williams of Kiona Vineyards and Jim Holmes, originally of Kiona then Ciel du Cheval vineyards, pioneered grape growing in the area. In the 1980s, wines made from grapes in the Red Mountain area began receiving recognition for their distinct flavor profiles though federal laws permitted wine labels only to carry the designation as being from the Columbia Valley AVA or Yakima Valley AVA. In the late 1990s, Lorne Jacobson from Hedges Family Estates started a drive to achieve federal recognition of the area as its own AVA, which was granted in April 2001. Hedges Family Estates' appellation petition was joined by Kiona Vineyards, Blackwood Canyon Vintners, Sandhill Wines and Terra Blanca Winery and Estate Vineyard.
The reputation of Red Mountain appellation bolstered an era of growth. Like most wine growing regions in eastern Washington, it is in the rain shadow of the Cascade Range making irrigation essential with water rights controlled by the state's Department of Ecology. In the past, this limited commercial growth and the opening of new wineries in the area though restrictions may be reduced in the future. In anticipation of future growth, a committee of local grape growers was formed to promote the development of the area's roads and infrastructure.
In 2007, Chateau Ste Michelle and Marchesi Antinori invested 6.5 million dollars in the appellation to purchase vineyards and establish a winery to produce their joint venture wine, Col Solare. In 2013 the Aquilini family purchased 670 acres (271 ha) on Red Mountain establishing Aquilini Family Vineyards.

== Terroir ==
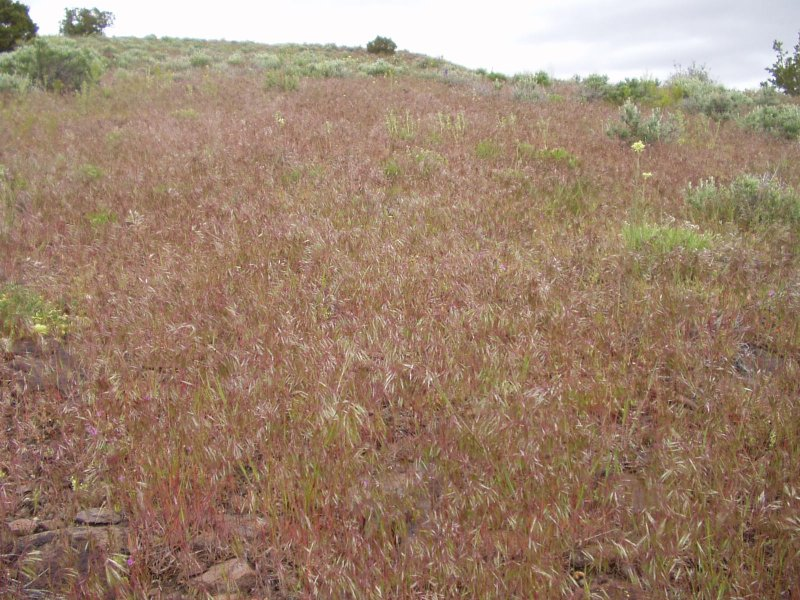
Red Mountain is named from the vibrant red-wine springtime bloom of the cheatgrass.

=== Topography ===
The Missoula floods, a series of massive floods that occurred at the end of the last Ice Age, profoundly affected the soils of Red Mountain. The fast traveling flood waters, estimated at 1,280 feet (390 m) tall, would sweep around the east and west edges of Red Mountain, creating powerfully back-eddies. As a result, sediments were deposited in an irregular manner, creating a heterogeneous soil with a series of gravel lenses. In the 10,000 years since the Missoula floods, wind-blown loess was deposited, creating a thin mantle of dunes that vary in thickness throughout the Red Mountain region. This has created a series of soils that differ from those of the immediately surrounding area.
The topography to the northeast features part of the Columbia Basin lowlands where the Columbia River turns southward towards the Saddle Mountains. With elevations ranging from 500 to 1,500 feet (152–457 m), the landscape dominates this area of the lower Yakima Valley. Red Mountain derives its name from the red-wine springtime bloom of the drooping brome or "cheatgrass" on its slopes. The soil in the area is very gravelly, with high alkalinity (high pH) and calcium carbonate content.

=== Climate ===
The area has one of the most unusual terroirs in the state with the southwest facing slopes documenting warmer temperatures and more sunlight hours than any other part of the Columbia Valley. The nighttime temperatures drop considerably, helping to preserve the acid levels within the grape. At Benton City, the Yakima River flows past the area and provides a moderating effect on the temperature. Cool air from the northern elevations flowing to the lower river valley moves across the hillside vineyards and keeps the grapes from being overheated. This constant air movement prevents air settling and frost damage to the grapes The area has a desert climate with average annual rainfall of 5 inches (130 mm). During the growing season, daytime temperatures average 90 °F (32 °C) with nighttime temperatures dropping below 50 °F (10 °C). Vineyards rely on irrigation to supply water to the vines allowing viniters to optimize the growth cycle of their grapevines. The USDA plant hardiness zone is 7b.

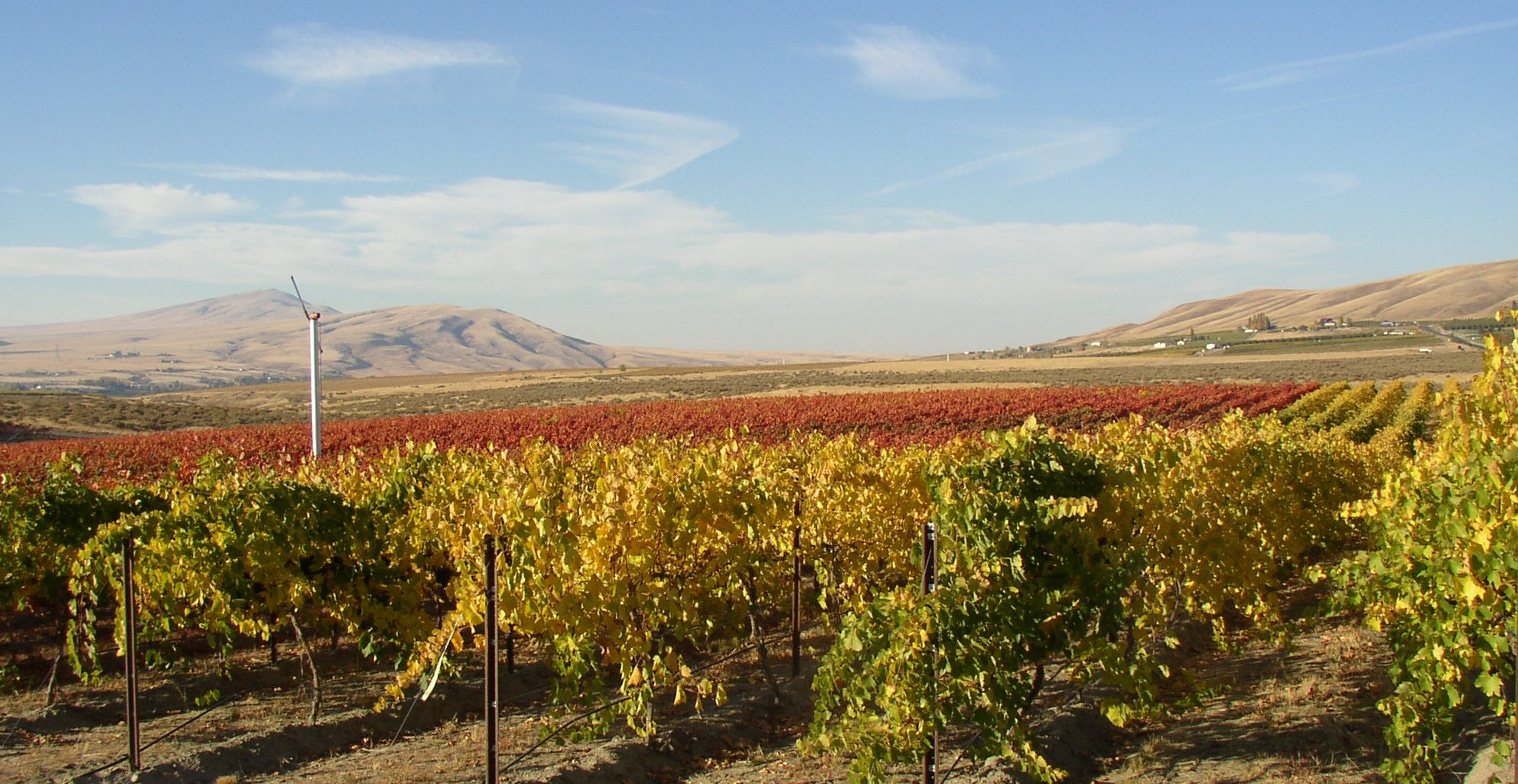
Kiona Vineyard with Red Mountain, the Yakima River gap and Rattlesnake Mountain as background

=== Soils ===
Red Mountain’s soil associations (landscapes with distinctive proportional patterns of soils) are unique in the Yakima Valley viticultural area. In support of this statement, the petitioner submitted soil survey maps issued by the U.S. Department of Agriculture’s Soil Conservation Service for the Yakima County and Benton County areas. Using these maps, the petitioner compared the soil associations for Red Mountain and other grape growing areas in the Yakima Valley viticultural area. According to the Benton County area soil survey maps, the dominant soil association of Red Mountain is Warden-Shano. A more specific analysis reveals that the following soils are present within the Warden-Shano association: Warden silt loam, Hezel loamy fine sand, Scooteney silt loam, and Kiona very stony silt loam. The petitioner compared this data with soil data for Gleed, Buena and Sunnyside other grape growing areas in Washington State within the Yakima Valley viticultural area. The soil associations of these areas are composed of Weirman-Ashue, Harwood-Gorst-Selah, Ritzville-Starbuck, Cowiche-Roza, Warden Esquatzel, and Quincy-Hezel. Thus, argues the petitioner, Red Mountain has a soil association which sets it apart from the rest of the Yakima Valley viticultural area.

== Wines ==
The area is known for producing powerful, tannic red wines. The wines are known for their balance in flavors, with an intense concentration of berry flavors. Compared to the Cabernet Sauvignon produced in other areas of the state, the Cabernets here are more structured than fruit-driven. Grapes from this area are in high demand and vineyards with notable reputations can receive as much as 30% above market price for their crops. The primary Cabernet Sauvignon clone planted is clone #8, which in Red Mountain produces a Cabernet wine similar in profile to a California wine, while the same clone planted in nearby Horse Heaven Hills AVA produces a wine similar in profile to Bordeaux. Since 2016, the Red Mountain AVA Alliance hosts the annual Red Mountain Cabernet Summit for key members of the wine industry from around the country to participate in events and tastings designed to promote what makes Red Mountain a unique wine grape producing region.

=== 100 Point Wines ===
Many of Washington's cult wines are produced from Cabernet Sauvignon grapes grown in this AVA including the 2002, 2003 and 2005 Quilceda Creek Vintners Cabernet Sauvignon, which scored the rare 100 point wine rating from Robert Parker's The Wine Advocate. At the time, only 15 other wines in the US had received this designation, all made from California grapes. Only five other previous vintages have received consecutive perfect scores in The Wine Advocate's publishing history. The Quilceda Creek wines were blends from three Red Mountain vineyards, Ciel du Cheval, Klipsun, and Tapteil, and one vineyard in adjoining Horse Heaven Hills viticultural area.

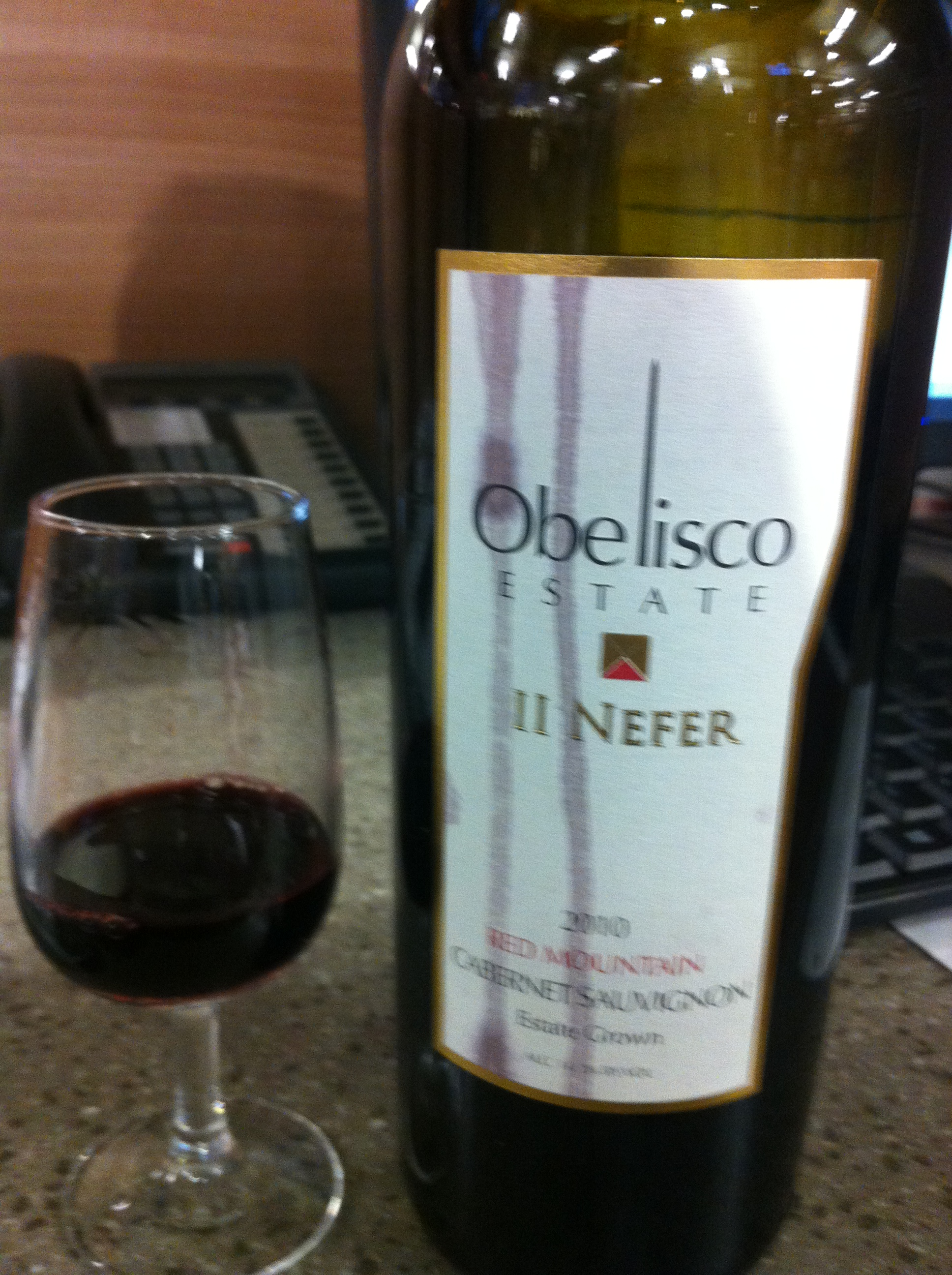
Obelisco Estate Cabernet Sauvignon

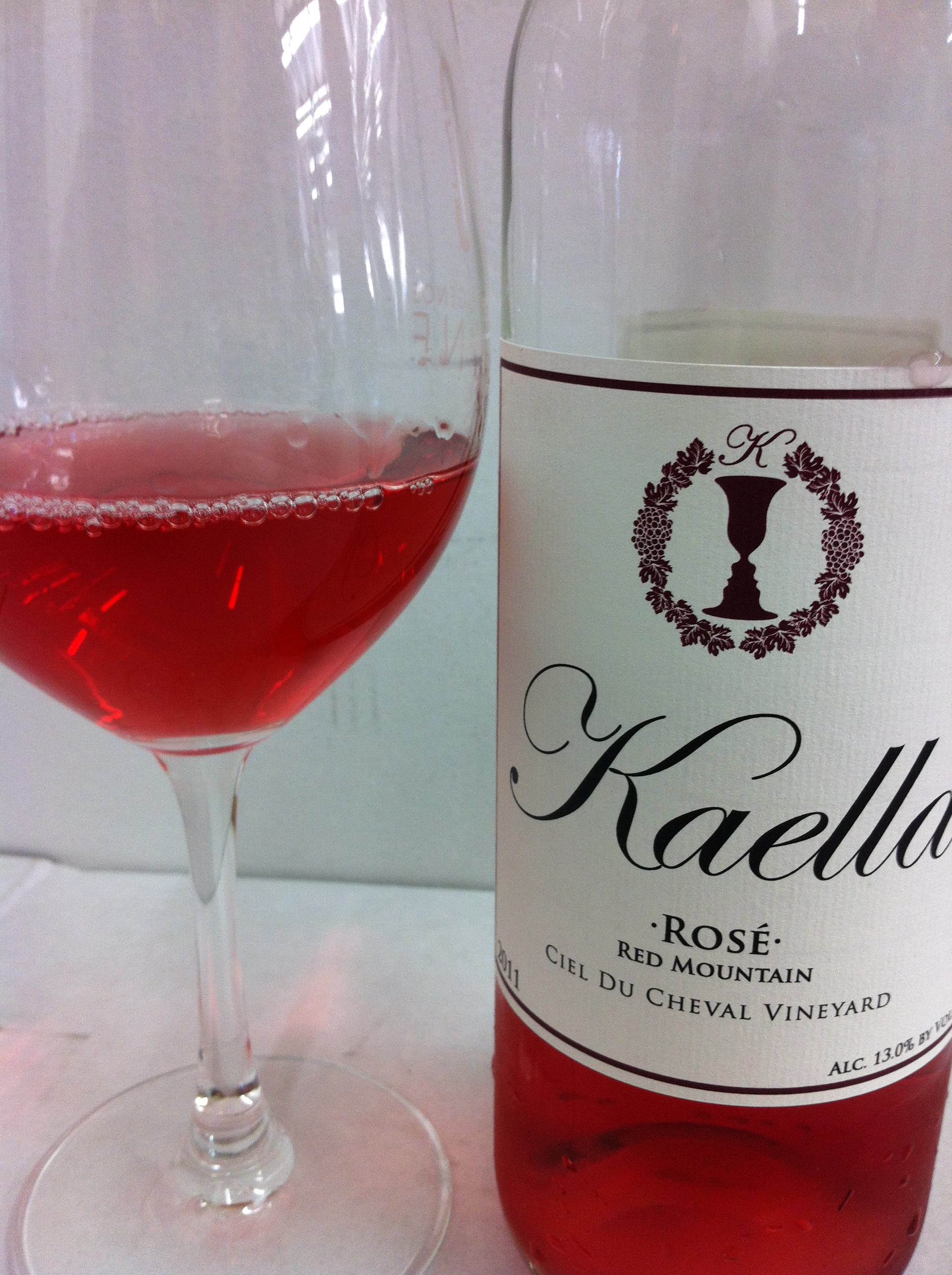
Ciel du Cheval Rose wine

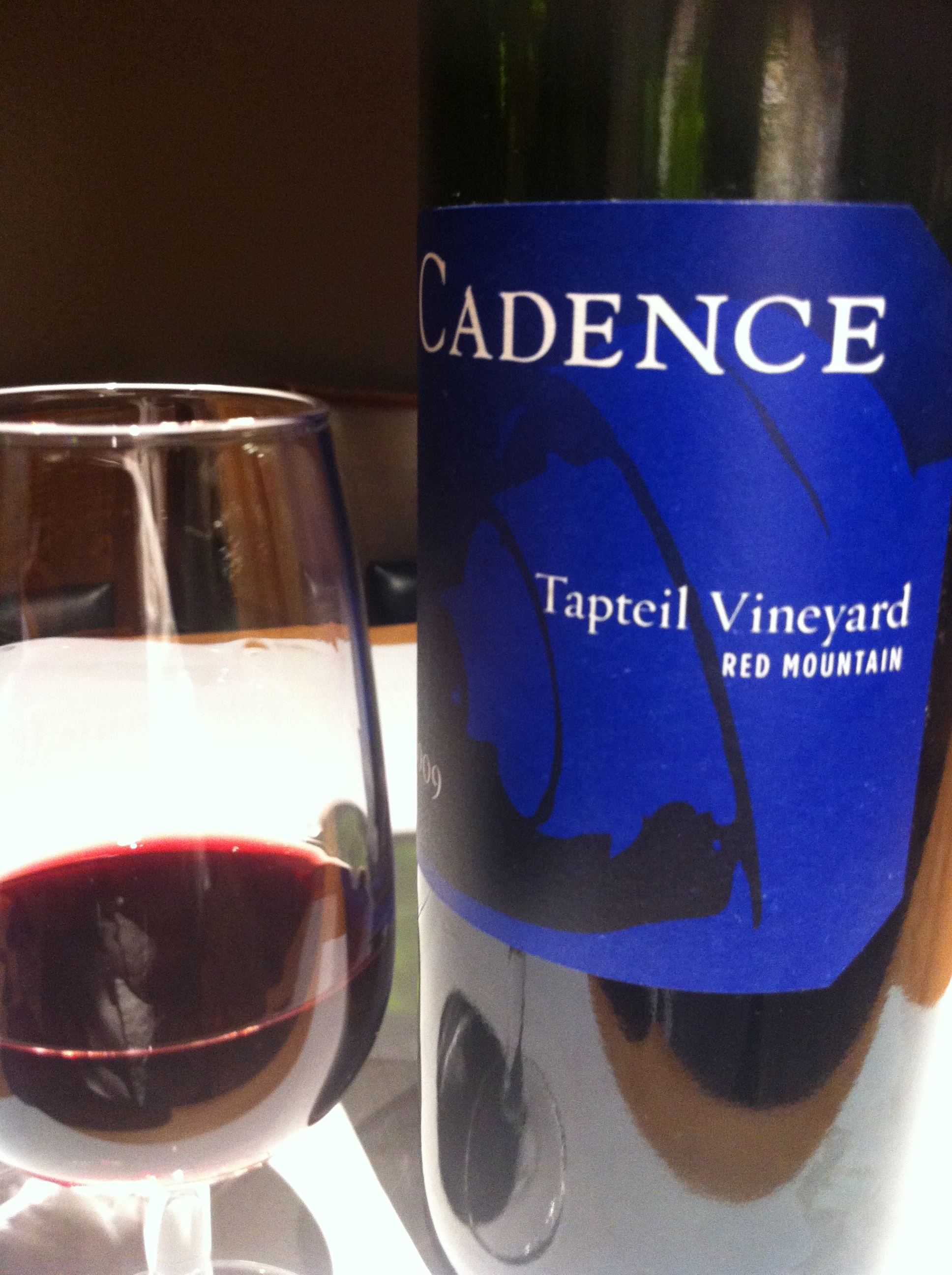
Tapteil Vineyard Red blend

== Vineyards ==
- Aquilini
- Artz Vineyard
- Avennia Estate Vineyard (Formerly Tapteil Vineyard)
- Bel Tramato
- Bel Villa
- Blackwood Canyon
- Cara Mia, Cadence Winery
- Casad Vineyards
- Ciel du Cheval
- Col Solare Estate Vineyard
- Cooper Estate Vineyard
- Fidélitas Estate Vineyard
- Force Majeure Vineyards (Formerly "Grand Rêve")
- Grand Ciel Vineyard, DeLille Cellars
- Heart of the Hill
- Hedges Estate
- Hightower "Out of Line" Estate Vineyard
- Jolet Vineyard
- Klipsun
- Kiona Estate
- Les Gosses
- Magdalena
- Obelisco Estate Vineyard
- Quintessence
- Ranch at the End of the Road
- Red Heaven
- Red Mountain Railroad Vineyard
- Scooteney Flats
- Sunset Bench
- Terra Blanca Estate Vineyard
- Tinte Estate Vineyard
- Upchurch
- WeatherEye

== Wineries ==
- Anelare Winery
- Avennia
- Col Solare Winery
- Cooper Wine Company
- Elk Haven Winery
- Fidélitas
- Frichette Winery
- Hamilton Cellars
- Hedges Family Estate
- Hightower Cellars
- Kiona Vineyards and Winery
- Monte Scarlatto Estate Winery
- Red Mountain Trails Winery
- Terra Blanca
