= Columbia Hills =

Columbia Hills can refer to the following:

- Columbia Hills (Washington), an area of hills in Washington state, USA
  - Columbia Hills State Park, a Washington state park in the area of the same name.
- Columbia Hills (Mars), a range of low hills inside Gusev crater on Mars
