= Yakima Valley AVA =

Wine grape-growing region in Washington, U.S.

Coordinates: 46°27′10″N 120°17′10″W

Yakima Valley
- Wine region
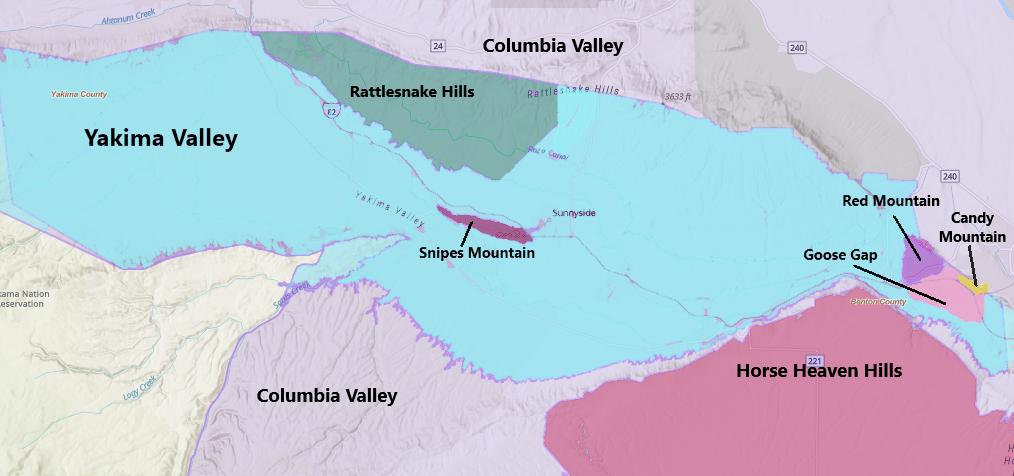
- Type: American Viticultural Area
- Year established: 1983; 2020 Amended
- Years of wine industry: 157
- Country: United States
- Part of: Washington, Columbia Valley AVA, Yakima County
- Other regions in Washington, Columbia Valley AVA, Yakima County: Ancient Lakes of Columbia Valley AVA, Beverly, Washington AVA, Horse Heaven Hills AVA, Naches Heights AVA. Lake Chelan AVA, The Burn of Columbia Valley AVA, Rocky Reach AVA, Royal Slope AVA, Walla Walla Valley AVA, Wahluke Slope AVA, White Bluffs AVA
- Sub-regions: Rattlesnake Hills AVA, Red Mountain AVA, Snipes Mountain AVA, Candy Mountain AVA, Goose Gap AVA
- Growing season: 184-196 days
- Climate region: Region II-III
- Heat units: 2,207-3,048 GDD units
- Precipitation (annual average): 5.88 to 12.41 inches (149.35–315.21 mm)
- Soil conditions: Silt-loam over basalt bedrock and gravel
- Total area: 699,520 acres (1,093 sq mi)
- Size of planted vineyards: 18,924 acres (7,658 ha)
- No. of vineyards: 40+
- Grapes produced: Aligote, Barbera, Black Muscat, Cabernet Franc, Cabernet Sauvignon, Chardonnay, Chenin blanc, Gamay Beaujolais, Gewurztraminer, Grenache, Lemberger, Malbec, Marsanne, Merlot, Mourvedre, Muscat Canelli, Orange Muscat, Petit Verdot, Petite Sirah, Pinot gris, Pinot noir, Riesling, Roussanne, Sangiovese, Sauvignon blanc, Semillon, Syrah, Viognier, Zinfandel
- No. of wineries: 60
- Wine produced: Varietal, Dessert wine, Sparkling wine, Meritage

Yakima Valley is an American Viticultural Area (AVA) located on a east-west axis in the nearly 75-mile long (121 km) by 22-mile wide (35 km) Yakima Valley landform centered around the Yakima River in south central Washington. The wine appellation was established as the nation's 28th and the state's initial AVA on April 4, 1983 by the Bureau of Alcohol, Tobacco and Firearms (ATF), Treasury after reviewing the petition submitted by the Yakima Valley Appellation Committee proposing a viticultural area named "Yakima Valley."

The approximately 699,520-acre (1,093 sq mi) Yakima Valley appellation cultivates more than 18,924 acres (7,658 ha) as the largest concentration of wineries and vineyards in the state. Nearly 40% of Washington's annual wine production is made from Yakima Valley grapes. The most widely planted varietals in the area are Chardonnay, Riesling, Merlot, Cabernet Sauvignon, Pinot gris, and Syrah. In addition to grapes, the Yakima Valley is also home to several fruit orchards growing apples, cherries, nectarines, peaches, pears and plums. The Zillah Fruit Loop driving tour around the town of Zillah explores the area's orchards and vineyards. The area is also home to nearly 80% of the US hop production. The Yakima Valley was ranked fourth in USA Today's 2025 10Best Wine Regions by its readers.
In 1984, Yakima Valley became a sub-appellation within the vast 11.5-million-acre (18,000 sq mi) Columbia Valley AVA.

== History ==
French winemaker, Charles Schanno, from Alsace-Lorraine is credited with planting the first Yakima Valley vines in 1869. Schanno purchased the cuttings from a vineyard in The Dalles, Oregon and the Hudson's Bay Company outpost at Fort Vancouver.

In the early 1900s, an attorney from Tacoma named William B. Bridgeman, a Sunnyside farmer and grapegrower, pioneered the modern wine industry in the Yakima Valley introducing "Island Belle" grapes. Bridgeman helped draft some of the state's earliest irrigation laws for wine growing and planted his first vineyard in 1914. Many of the vineyards established in the Yakima Valley during this period came from Bridgeman's cuttings. Concord grapes became the dominant grape throughout Washington State. However, they are not wine grapes and were processed at grape juice plants at Grandview, Washington and Prosser, Washington. In 1917, the Washington State Legislature passed an act setting aside 200 acres (81 ha) of sagebrush desert near Prosser to become an agriculture research center known as the Irrigation Branch Experiment Station (today known as the Irrigated Agriculture Research and Extension Center (IAREC), operated jointly by Washington State University and the USDA). The first crop was six acres (2 ha) of apples used in an irrigation study.

Following the Repeal of Prohibition, Bridgman opened Upland Winery and hired Erich Steenborg as winemaker. Together they determined that the Yakima Valley was better suited for wine growing than central France and were influential in promoting the use of varietal labeling in the Yakima Valley including the state's first dry Riesling.
In 1937, the research center hired Walter Clore as an assistant horticulturist. Under Clore's guidance, the center expanded into grape growing with Vitis labrusca, Vitis vinifera and American hybrid grape plantings. Research from the center would become vital to the growing Washington wine industry where the state counted 42 wineries, the largest of which was in the Yakima Valley.

In the 1950s, Dr. Lloyd Woodbume, a professor at the University of Washington in Seattle, began to produce home wines made from Washington State grapes. Other members of the university faculty joined him and in 1961 they incorporated and planted five acres (2 ha) of Pinot Noir and other Vinifera at Sunnyside adjacent to Bridgman's vineyard. Their group eventually became Associated Vineyards which released their first wines to the public in 1968. With demand for their Yakima Valley wines growing, they planted 20 more acres at Sunnyside, including Cabernet, Pinot Noir, Riesling, Gewurztraminer, Semilion, and Chardonnay. During the 1970s, additional acreage of Vinifera grapes were planted throughout Yakima Valley. In the 1980s, along with the rest of the Washington wine industry, the Yakima Valley saw a boom in the plantings of new vineyards and the openings of new wineries such as Hogue Cellars and Covey Run both opening in 1982, followed by Chinook Wines in 1983. By then, there were approximately 23,400 acres (9,470 ha) under vine in the valley. This includes 3,500 acres (1,416 ha) of Vinifera varieties, with the remainder being Concord, White Diamond, and Island Belle. Grapes are planted in nearly every location in the valley where irrigation is available, although the majority of the Vinifera grapes are planted on the south facing slopes of the Rattlesnake Hills, Red Mountain, Snipes Mountain and on the steeper north banks of the Yakima River. There are six bonded wineries in the Yakima Valley and the term Yakima Valley has been used since 1967 as an appellation of origin for wines made from Yakima Valley grapes.

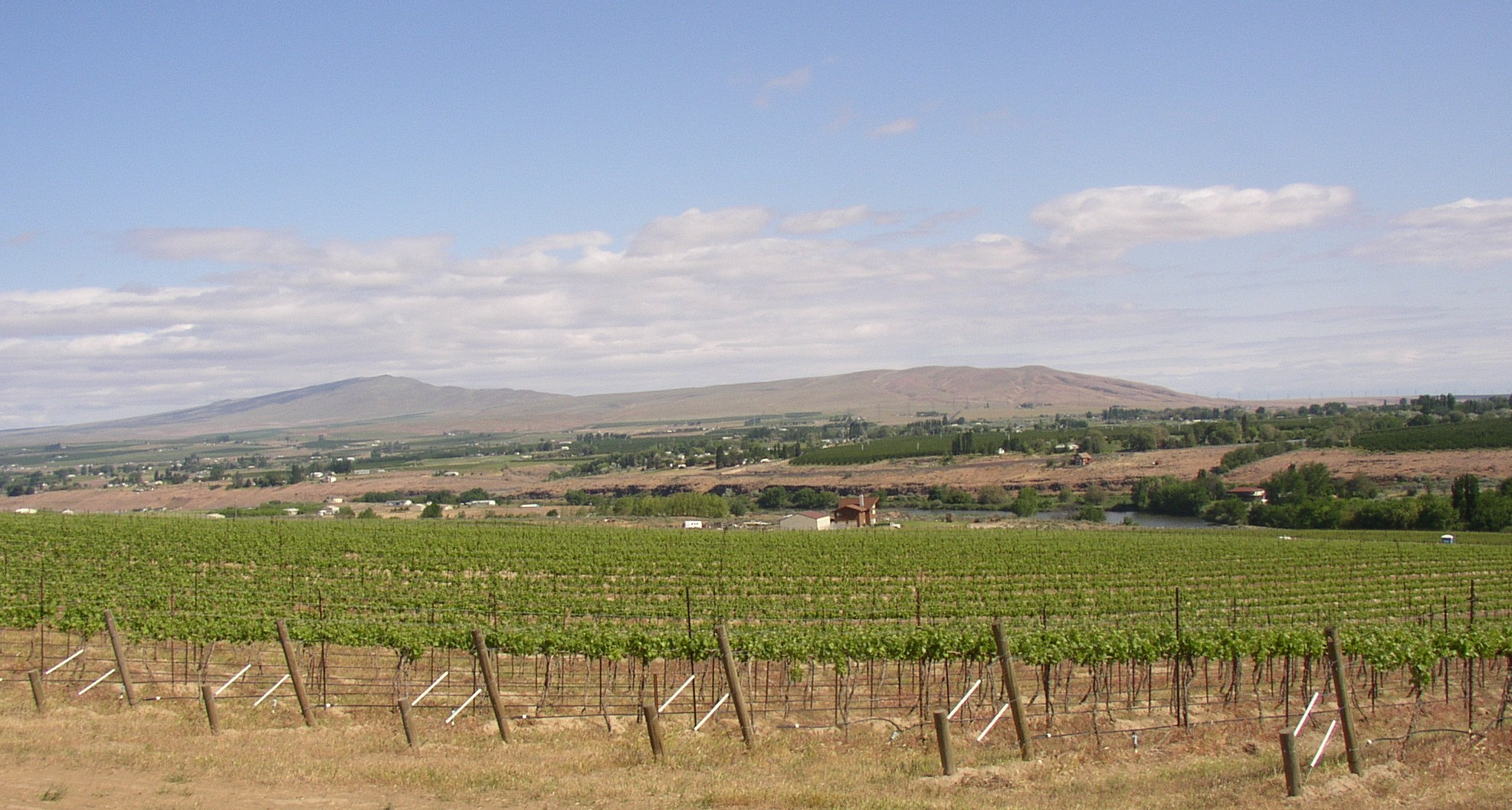
Chandler Reach Vineyards in the Yakima Valley in front of Rattlesnake Mountain beyond the Yakima River

== Terroir ==
=== Topography ===
The Yakima Valley appellation boundaries has the Rattlesnake Hills to the north, the Horse Heaven Hills to the south and Red Mountain forming parts of its eastern boundaries. To the west, the Cascade Range forms a natural border and creates a rain shadow over the area which requires the use of irrigation in viticulture. The appellation encompasses 600,000 acres (938 sq mi) mostly contained within Yakima County, Washington with the eastern edge extending into Benton County. The cities of Yakima and Prosser are the main commercial centers with many wineries located in their vicinities. To the west, Mount Adams dominates the landscape along with the Yakima River on its eastward flow to the Columbia River.

=== Climate ===
The climate of Yakima Valley is a distinguishing factor of the viticultural area. In general, the mountains to the west experience significantly cooler temperatures while Yakima Valley is not as warm as areas to the north and east. Within Yakima Valley, the climate averages Region II on the scale developed by Winkler and Amerine of the University of California, Davis to measure degree days. Eight stations average 2641 degree days with individual readings of 2207 at Toppenish, 2436 at Prosser 2665 at Sunnyside, and the highest reading 3048 degree days at Wapato. The mountain areas to the west experience a much cooler climate; Tieton Dam averages 1150 degree days, Goldendale 1779, and Status Pass 1334 degree days. These mountainous areas are classified as Region I. The area to the north following the Yakima River is slightly cooler than the Yakima Valley. Ellensburg experiences 1932 degree days, Yakima 2314, Naches Heights 2330, and Moxie 2574 degree days. In contrast to these cooler areas, the areas northeast, east and southeast of Yakima Valley experience a significantly hotter climate, and may be characterized as Region III. Individual degree day readings include 3231 at Hanford, 3720 at Priest Rapids Dam, 3890 at Richland 3094 at Kennewick and 3201 at McNary Dam. Rainfall in Yakima Valley is sparse. Eight reporting stations within the viticultural area average only 8.11 inches of precipitation per year with a range of 5.88 inches at Toppenish to .12.41 inches at Fort Simcoe. The mean average growing season (28 degree base) for four stations in Yakima Valley is 190 days, ranging from 184 days at White Swan to 196 days at Benton City. Overall, the temperature of the Yakima Valley is more temperate than the rest of the greater Columbia Valley AVA, with average temperatures being 5 to 10 °F (−15 to −12 °C) cooler. The USDA plant hardiness zones are 7a and 7b.

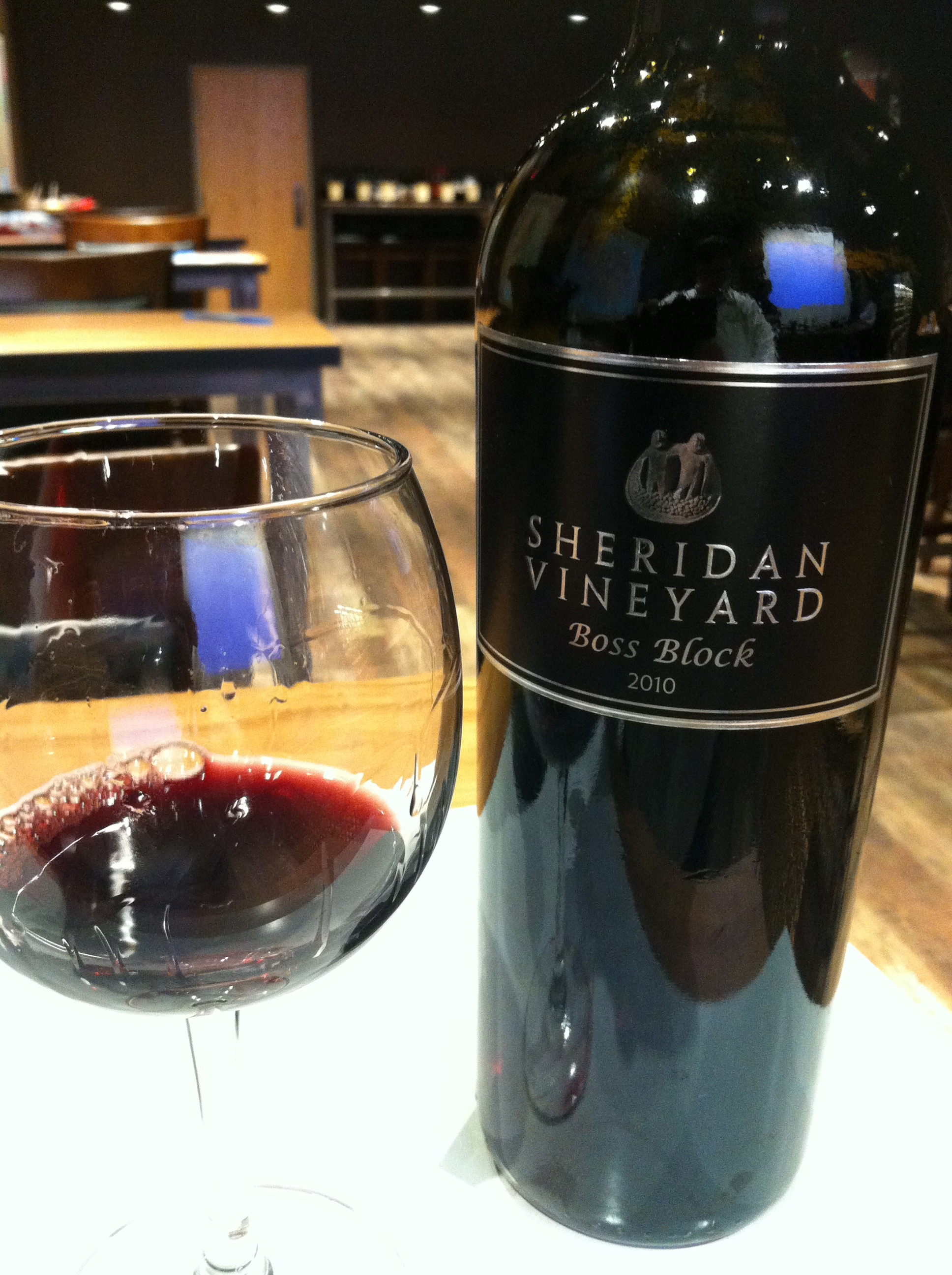
Cabernet Franc from Sheridan Vineyards

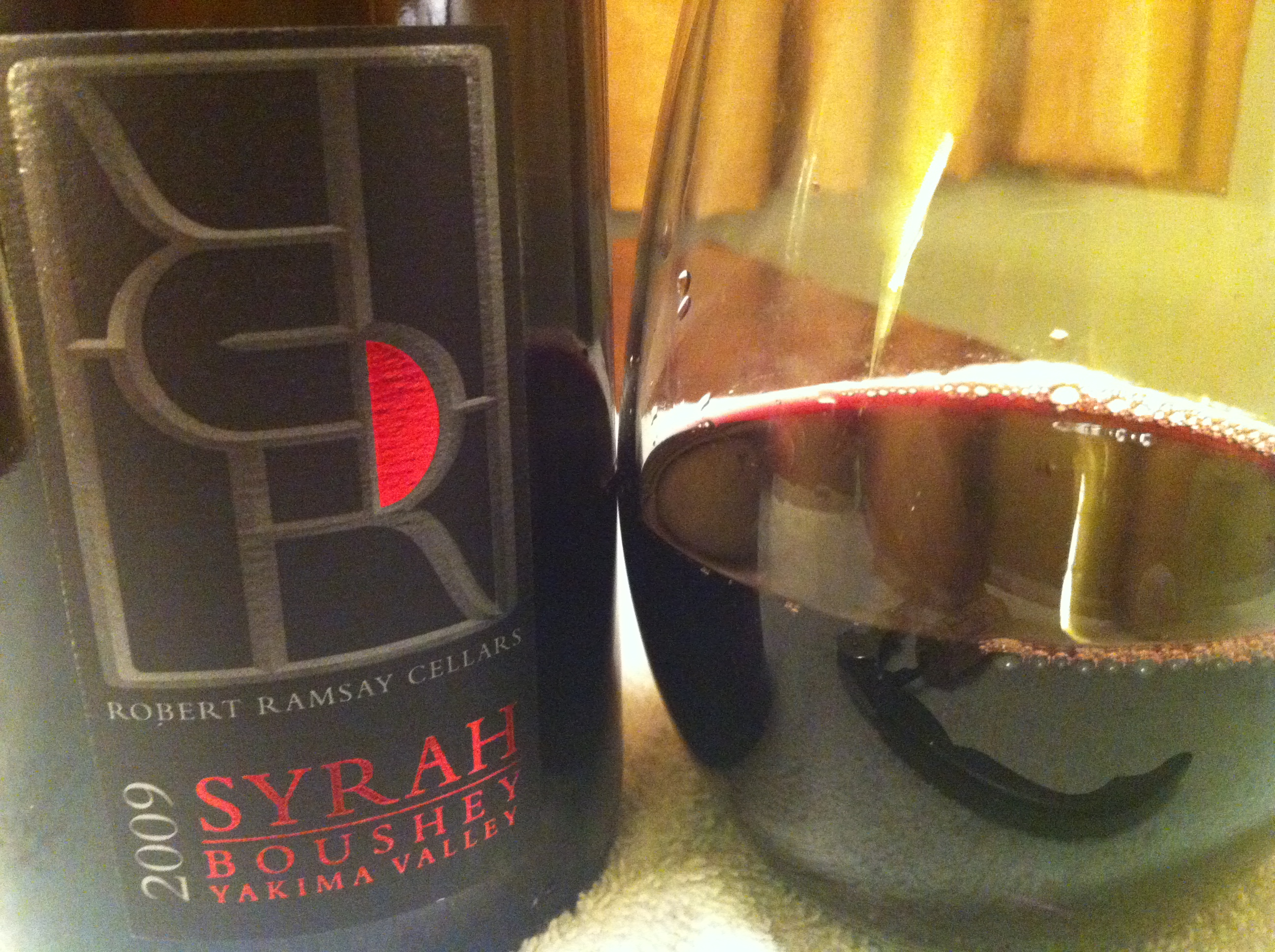
Syrah from Boushey Vineyards

== Vineyards ==
The Yakima Valley AVA is home to some of the state's oldest vineyards with nearly every major Washington wine maker securing at least some of their grapes from this appellation. Red Willow Vineyard near Wapato stands at the highest point in the Yakima Valley AVA at 1,300 feet (400 m) above sea level. The vineyard is known as the primary grape supplier to Columbia Winery. It was from this vineyard that winemaker David Lake produced the first Syrah in Washington state. Chardonnay is a popular planting in this cool climate appellation with most wine growers preferring a single clonal variety. Nearly any grape can ripen at some location within this diverse region. The most sought after sites are located on the eastern edge near Red Mountain, Prosser and Benton City. Yakima Valley also includes Boushey Vineyard, ranked as one of the top vineyards in Washington State.

== Sub-Appellations ==
As the Washington wine industry discovered Yakima Valley's many distinct terroirs, five local appellations were designated for their unique microclimates and soil conditions producing different vintages.

- Red Mountain (Est. Jun 2001, 4,040 acres (6 sq mi))
- Rattlesnake Hills (Est. Mar 2006, 68,500 acres (107 sq mi))
- Snipes Mountain (Est. Jan 2009, 4,145 acres (6 sq mi))
- Candy Mountain (Est. Sep 2020, 815 acres (1 sq mi))
- Goose Gap (Est. Aug 2021, 8,129 acres (13 sq mi))
