= Goose Gap =

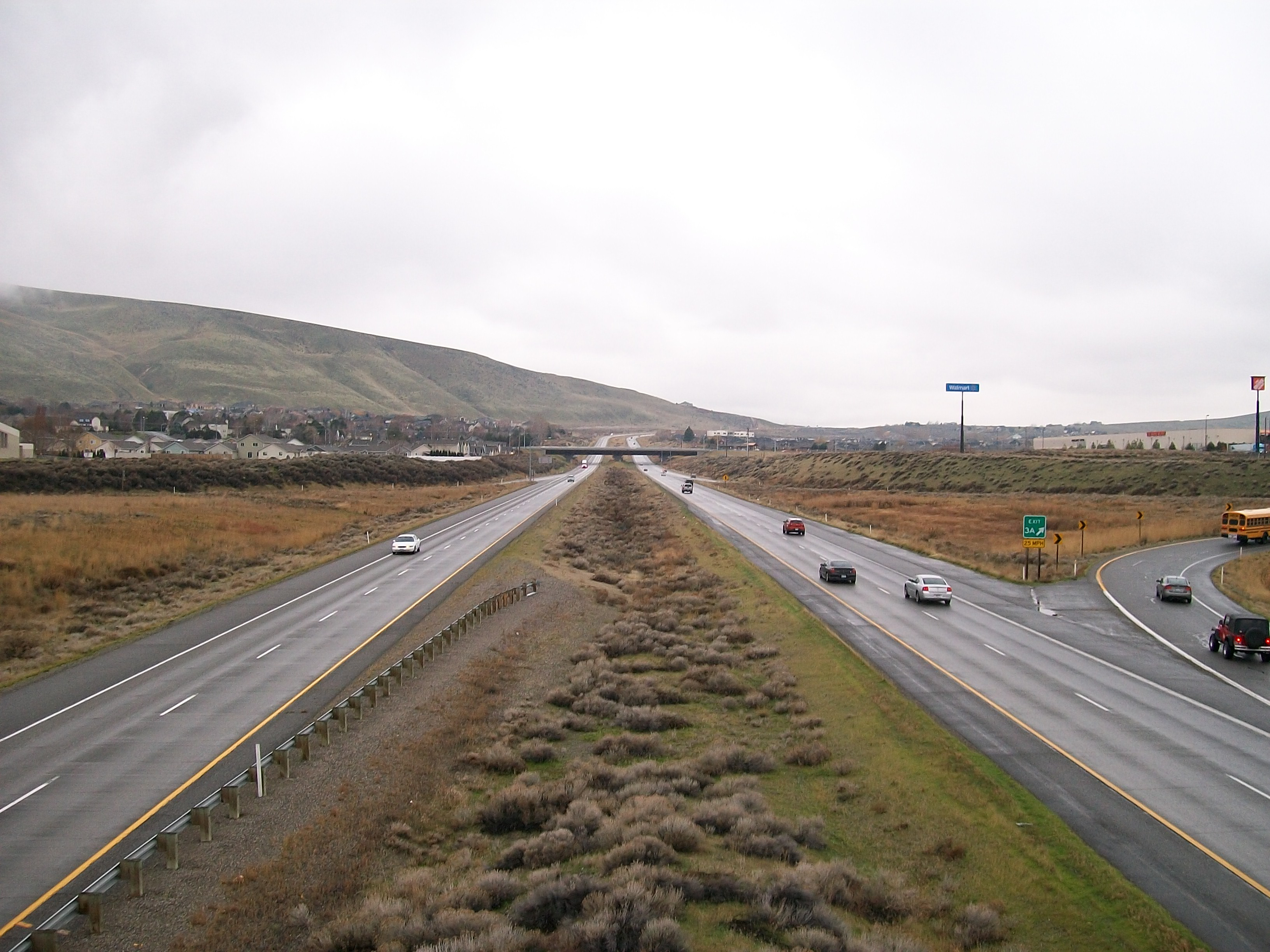
- Interstate 182 approaching Goose Gap.
- Interactive map of Goose Gap
- Elevation: 860 feet (260 m)
- Traversed by: I-182 & US 12

Third Approach
- Location: Benton County, Washington
- Range: Yakima Fold Belt
- Coordinates: 46°14′42″N 119°21′26″W

Goose Gap is a small pass connecting Badger Mountain to Candy Mountain to the west of Richland, Washington. It lies significantly higher than most of the Tri-Cities and is crossed by Interstate 182 just after its western terminus. An average of 18,000 people cross Goose Gap daily.

There are residential areas on both sides of I-182 to the east of the gap, but to the west is mostly agriculture. The non-profit organization Friends of Badger Mountain is planning a new hiking trail to connect Badger Mountain to Candy Mountain, which will cross Goose Gap in a north-to-south direction, perpendicular to the Interstate.

== See also ==
- Interstate 182
