= Badger Mountain (Benton County, Washington) =

Mountain in Washington (state), United States

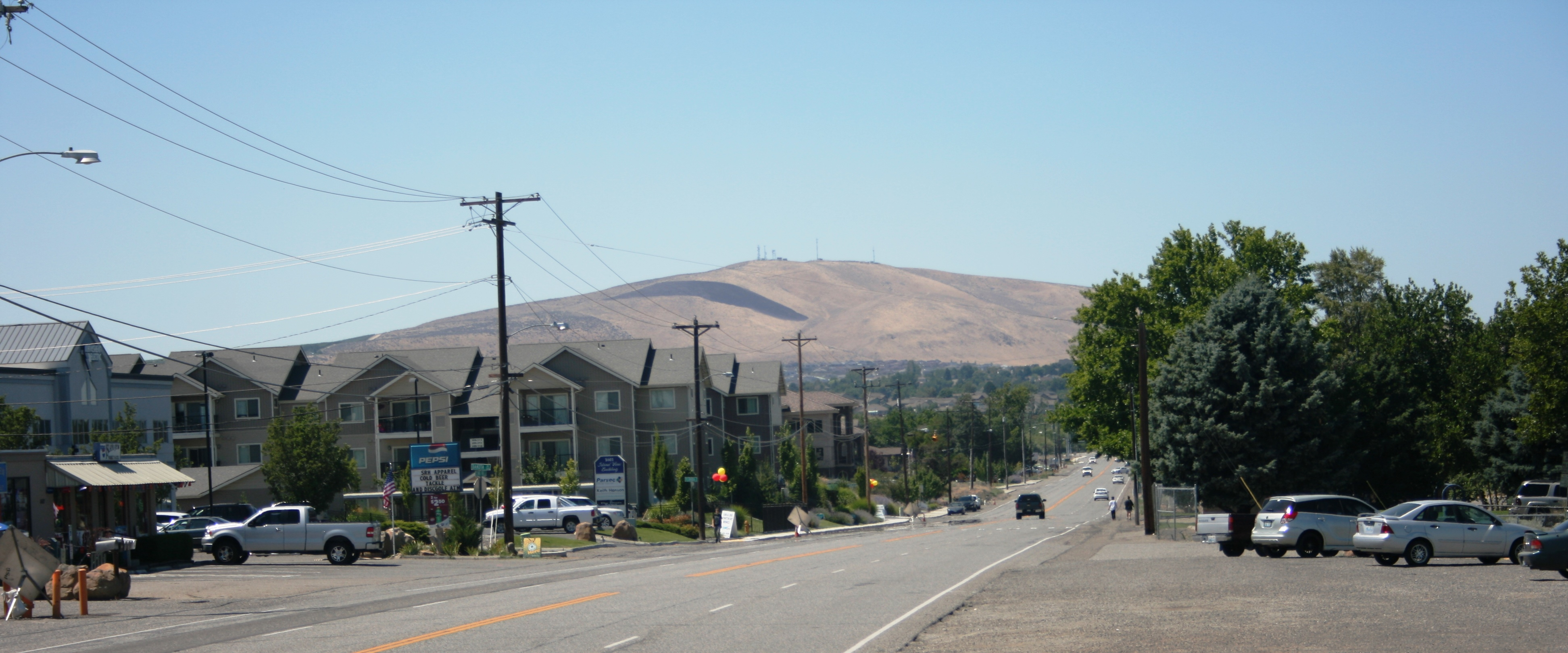
- Badger Mountain from the Richland Wye.

Highest point
- Elevation: 1,593 ft (486 m) NAVD 88
- Prominence: 915 ft (279 m)
- Isolation: 8.44 mi (13.58 km)
- Coordinates: 46°14′04″N 119°19′17″W

Geography
- Location within Washington (state)
- Country: United States
- State: Washington
- County: Benton County
- City: Richland
- Parent range: Columbia River Plateau
- Topo map: USGS Badger Mountain

Climbing
- Easiest route: Hike

Badger Mountain is a small mountain in Richland, Washington. Badger rises above the Tri-Cities connected to the smaller Candy Mountain via Goose Gap, is visible throughout much of the area and is a popular hiking destination for a wide variety of climbers. There are a number of trails climbing the mountain with varying levels of difficulty. There are two summits on Badger Mountain, named the East Summit and the West Summit. The West Summit is the highest.

Most of Badger Mountain is protected by the Badger Mountain Centennial Preserve, but the radio towers at the peak are private property. A non-profit group, Friends of Badger Mountain, worked to procure this shrub-steppe area that has most native vegetation intact and then built a trail to the summit. The 1.2 miles (1.9 km) trail rises 984 feet (300 m) above the trail head in Richland.

== Geology ==
Badger Mountain is a member of the Yakima Fold Belt, a series of topographical folds (or wrinkles) raised from tectonic compression. The Yakima Fold Belt extends from Interstate 90 near Vantage, Washington to the Columbia River near Wallula, Washington. The Yakima Fold Belt is a portion of the larger Olympic–Wallowa Lineament, which extends from near Port Angeles, Washington into northeastern Oregon.

Badger Mountain is also a part of the Columbia River Basalt Group. Sometime between 10 and 15 million years ago, multiple lava flows poured out from the Yellowstone hotspot, then located in western Idaho. These lava flows covered large portions of Washington and Oregon on their way to the Pacific Ocean and are the cause of the underlying basalt of the region. In some areas, the basalt was 5,900 feet (1,800 m) thick.

During the time of the last ice age, glaciers extended into northern Washington, Idaho and Montana. This blocked the Clark Fork River creating Glacial Lake Missoula. Periodically during the ice age, the weight of the water behind the ice dam caused it to break creating the Missoula Floods. As these floods rushed toward the Pacific Ocean they carried glacial erratics, chunks of granite not typically found in eastern Washington. The surface elevation of the flood water reached 1,250 feet (380 m) above sea level at Badger Mountain, making it into an island for a short time. Glacial erratics of various sizes can be seen up to this elevation on the mountain and there is a marker along the Canyon Trail at 1250 feet above sea level.

== Recreation ==
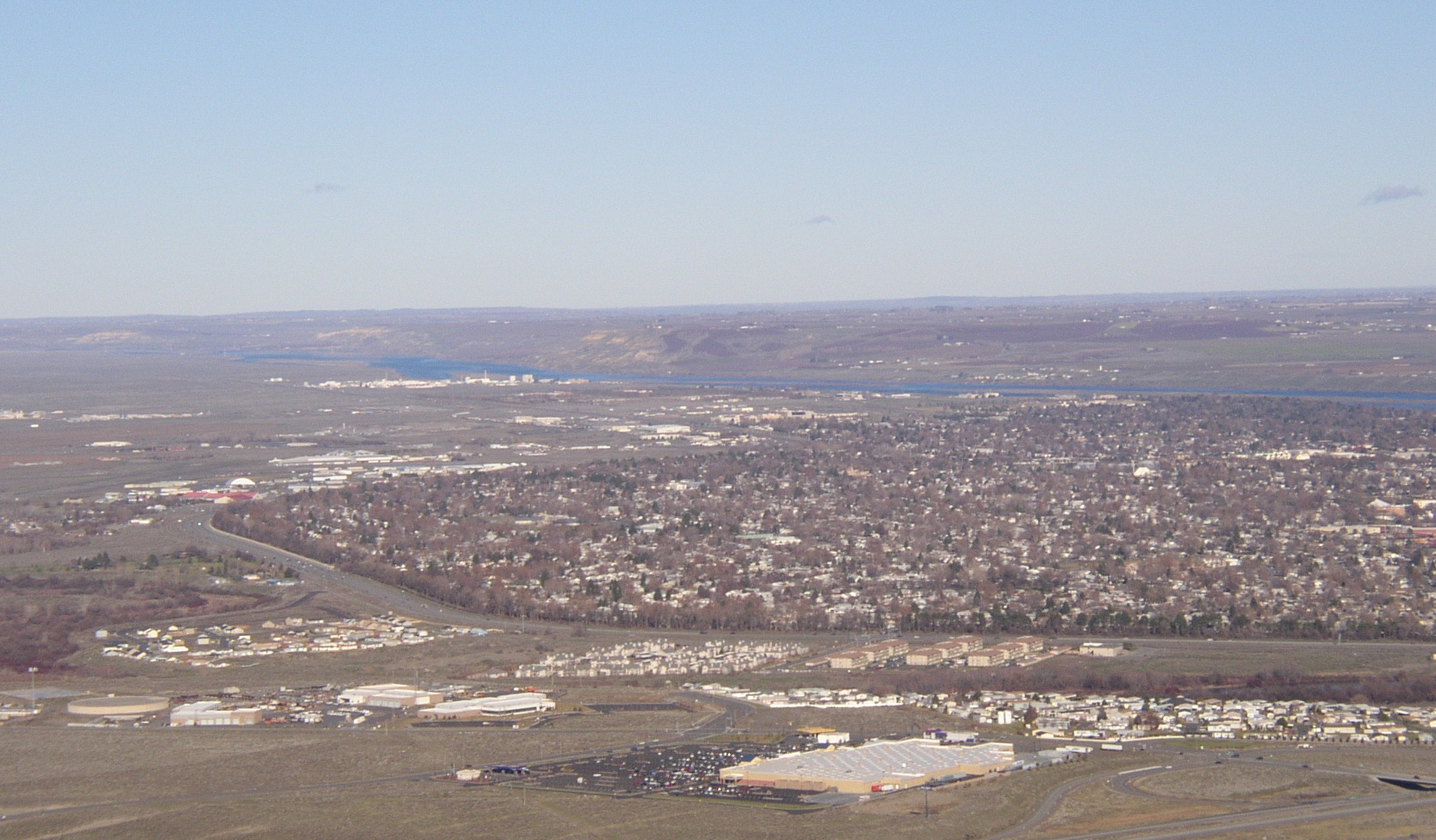
Central Richland as seen from Badger Mountain

There are two trails leading to the peak of the mountain, with three other trails on the slopes of the mountain. Badger Mountain is a popular location for hiking and photography because of its height above the Tri-Cities and the views it gives. On a clear day from the peak one can see Rattlesnake Mountain, and the Blue Mountains as well as major Cascade Mountains such as Mount Hood, Mount Adams, Mount Rainier and Mount Stuart.

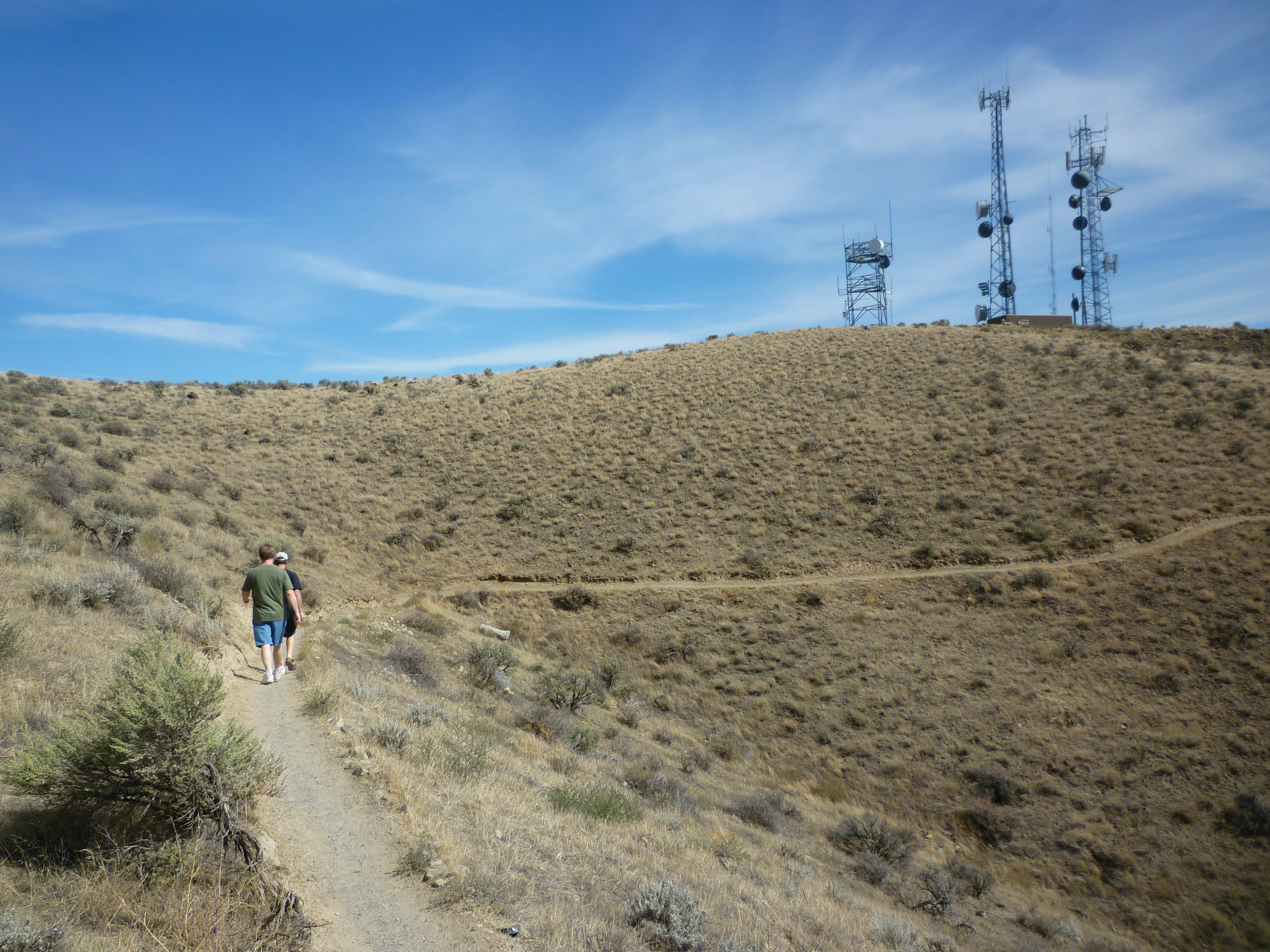
Hiking trail near summit

In 2010 more than 71,000 people visited the mountain.

=== Hiking ===
The Canyon and Skyline Trails reach the peak. The Canyon Trail is 1.3 miles (2.1 km) long and starts at Trailhead Park. The Canyon Trail only allows hikers. The Skyline Trail is 2.9 miles (4.7 km) long and starts off of Dallas Road on the northwest side of Badger. The Skyline Trail goes along the spine of Badger Mountain and is open to hiking, mountain biking and horseback riding.

The Langdon, Sagebrush and Badger Flats Trails do not reach the peak. The Sagebrush Trail is a spur off of the Skyline Trail, connecting it to Trailhead Park. The Langdon Trail wraps around the south side of the mountain, offering views of Badger Canyon and the Horse Heaven Hills. It is open to hikers, mountain bikers and horseback riders. The Badger Flats Trail is completely within Trailhead Park and is 0.6 miles (0.97 km) in length.

== Climate and wildlife ==
Badger Mountain lies in the rain shadow of the Cascade Mountains and as such has a semi-arid climate with mild winters and hot summers. The average rainfall at the nearest airport is 7.94 inches (202 mm) per year and temperatures above 100 °F (38 °C) are not uncommon. Because of this, Badger Mountain shares much of the same wildlife as the surrounding area including sagebrush, jackrabbits and rattlesnakes. There are no naturally occurring trees on the mountain.

Winter snows are also not uncommon.

== See also ==
- Rattlesnake Mountain
