= Red Mountain (Benton County, Washington) =

Mountain in Washington (state), United States

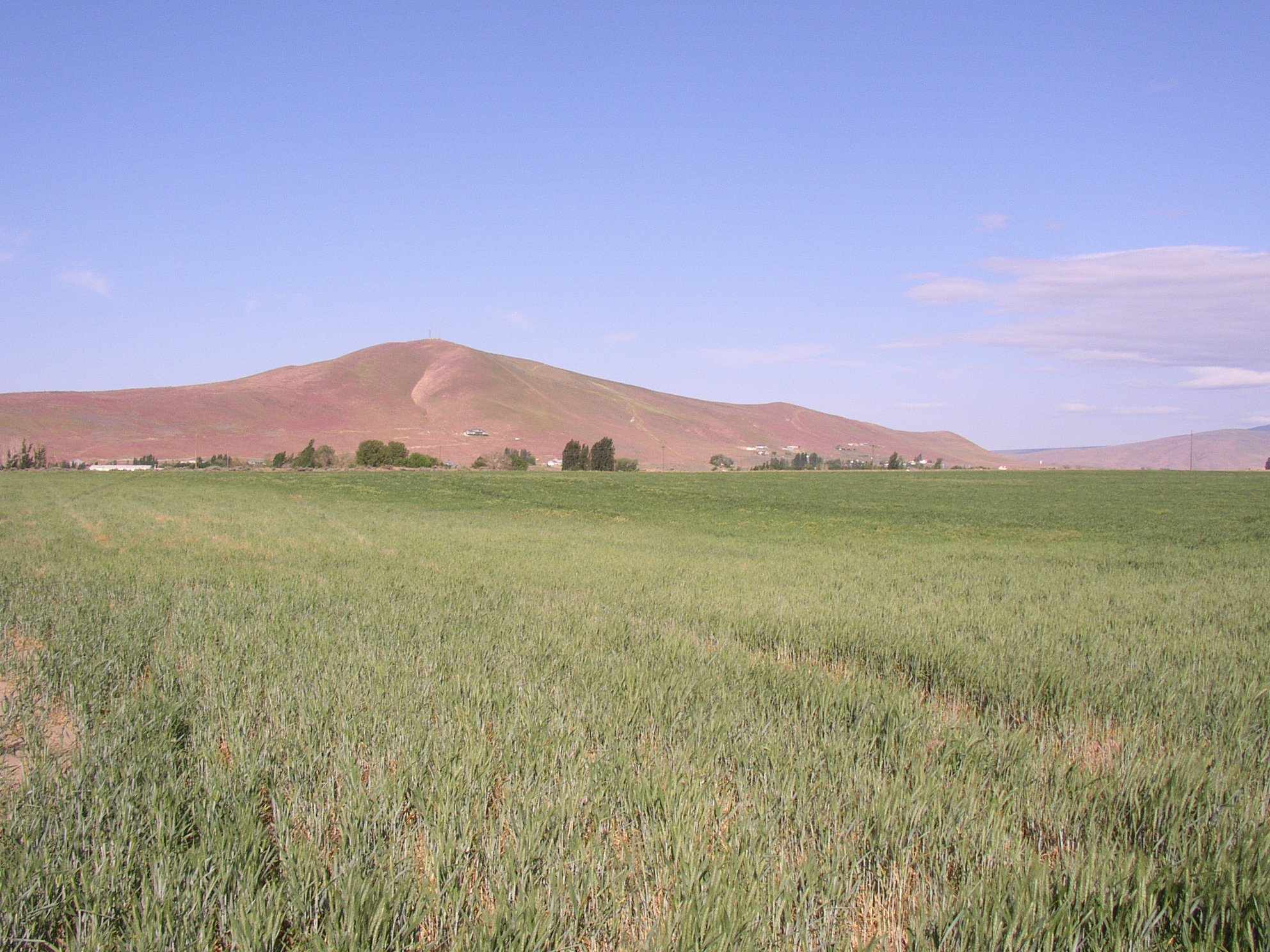
- Red Mountain as seen from the east in 2007.

Highest point
- Elevation: 1,410 ft (430 m) NGVD 29
- Prominence: 720 ft (220 m)
- Coordinates: 46°17′52″N 119°26′27″W

Geography
- Location within Washington (state)
- Location: Benton County, Washington, U.S.
- Topo map: USGS Benton City

Red Mountain is located in the southeast corner of Washington state near the Tri-Cities between Rattlesnake Mountain and Candy Mountain. This region is situated among the Columbia, Snake and Yakima Rivers. The mountain covers an area of approximately 4,040 acres (6.31 sq mi). Its name is derived from the red-wine springtime bloom of the drooping brome or "cheatgrass" on its slopes.

In 2001, the Bureau of Alcohol, Tobacco and Firearms (ATF), Treasury recognized Red Mountain as an American Viticultural Area (AVA) after reviewing the petition submitted by Lorne Jacobson of Hedges Cellars to establish an area known as "Red Mountain." Some of Washington's primer wine estates source grapes from Red Mountain. The sandy loam soil of the region is high in calcium and alkaline. Red Mountain's vineyards are characterized by good air drainage, light soils and deeply rooted vines. With only 6 to 8 inches (200 mm) of annual rainfall, area growers must irrigate, which allows them to control vine vigor and ease vines into dormancy before winter. Red Mountain's growing season averages 180 days. The vineyards are located on the south-facing slopes, between the cities of Benton City and West Richland within the larger Yakima Valley viticultural area. About 700 acres (283 ha) of the mountain slopes are cultivated for winegrapes, which mainly include Cabernet Sauvignon, Merlot, Cabernet Franc, Syrah and Sangiovese. The area is resident to 37 wineries.

== Nearby cities and towns ==
Benton City, Kennewick, Pasco, Prosser, Richland, West Richland.

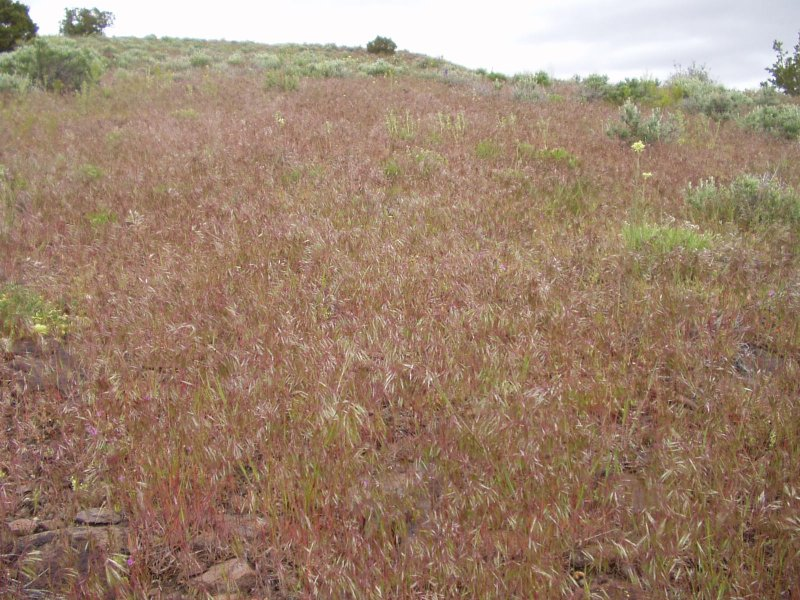
Red Mountain is named for the cheatgrass' vibrant red-wine springtime bloom.
