= Candy Mountain (Washington) =

Mountain in Washington (state), United States

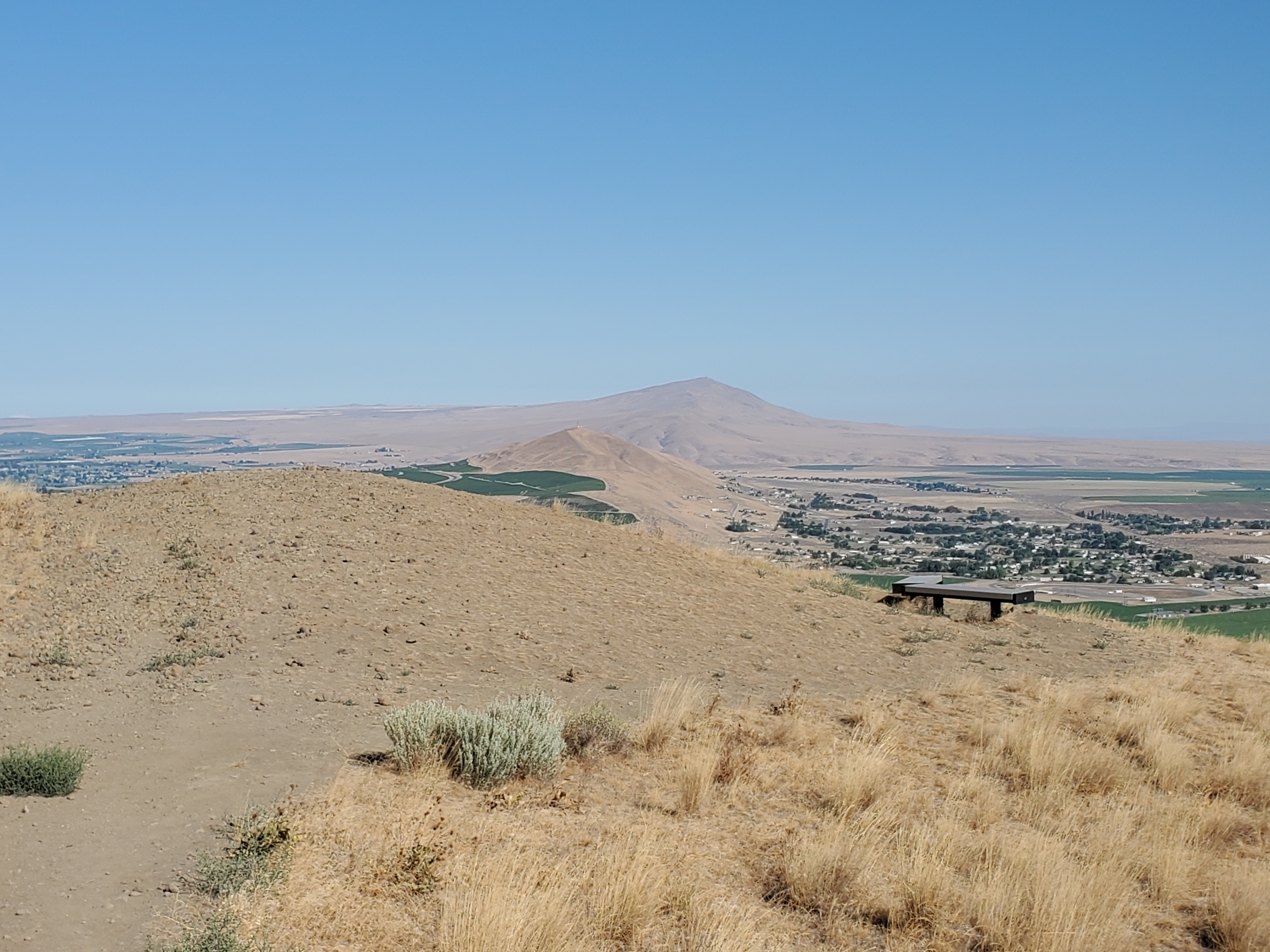
- View from Candy Mountain Summit showing Red Mountain and Rattlesnake Mountain to the north west.

Highest point
- Elevation: 1,394 ft (425 m) NAVD 88
- Prominence: 536 ft (163 m)
- Isolation: 2.76 mi (4.44 km)
- Coordinates: 46°15′33″N 119°22′00″W

Geography
- Location within Washington (state)
- Location: West Richland, Benton County, Washington, U.S.
- Parent range: Columbia River Plateau
- Topo map: USGS Richland

Climbing
- Easiest route: Hike

Candy Mountain is a small mountain located just outside West Richland, Washington. Candy Mountain rises above the Tri-Cities, located between Badger Mountain to the south and Red Mountain to the north.

Candy Mountain is connected to Badger Mountain by Goose Gap. There is a primitive road leading to the top, and the remains of an old radio tower. The non-profit organization Friends of Badger Mountain, in collaboration with Benton County, raised funds and pursued grants to purchase 200 acres of land surrounding Candy Mountain to build new trails on the mountain and connect it to Badger Mountain.

== Trail ==
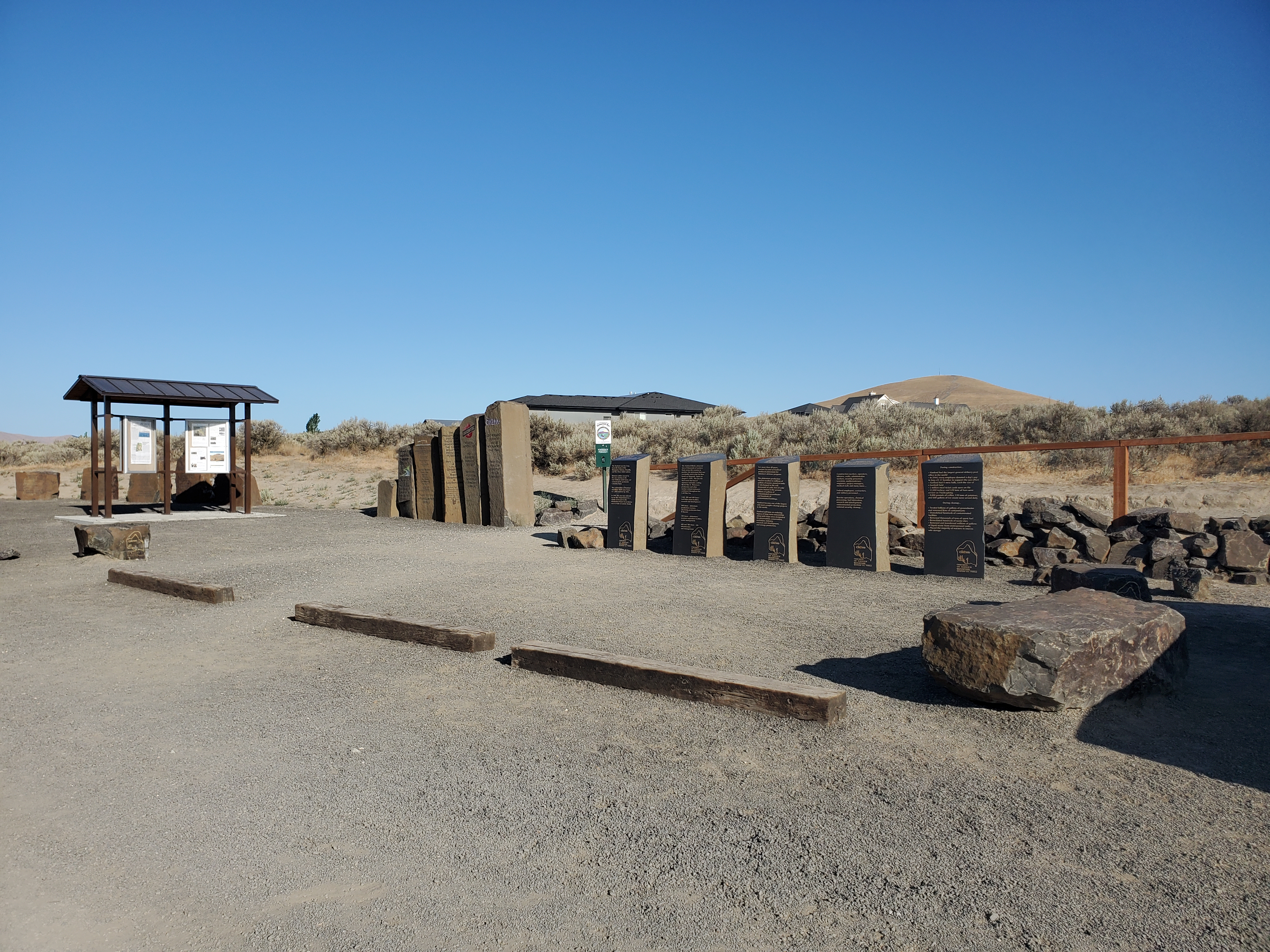
Candy Mountain traihead parking lot

There is a trail that hikers can use starting on the east side of the mountain, leading to the top. The 1.4-mile (2.3 km) trail is fairly steep, but one can reach the summit in around 20 minutes. Along the climb, there are interpretive signs pointing out local flora and describing the ice age floods that have shaped the region. Several glacial erratics can be seen on the hike. The summit affords views of Rattlesnake Mountain, Red Mountain, Goose Gap, and Badger Mountain. On clear days, Mount Adams and Mount Rainier can be seen in the distance to the west.
