= Alexandria Nicole Cellars =

Winery in Washington, United States

Coordinates: 45.8794452°N 119.8983283°W

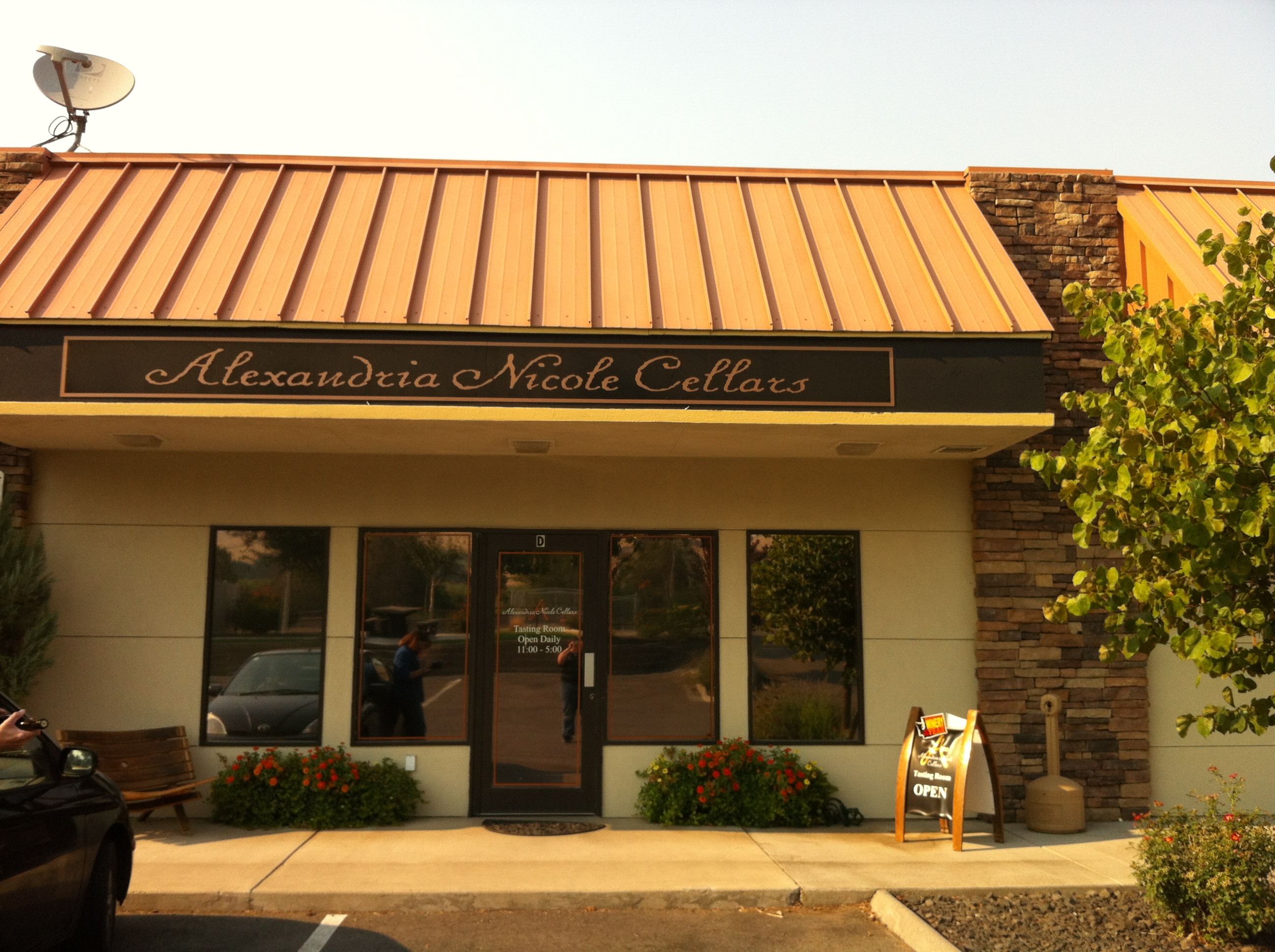
Alexandria Nicole Cellar's Prosser tasting room.

Alexandria Nicole Cellars is a Washington winery that specializes in making estate wine from its Destiny Ridge Vineyard located in the Horse Heaven Hills AVA. Founded in 2001 by Jarrod and Ali Boyle, the winery expanded to include tasting rooms in Prosser, Washington and Woodinville wine country where it is housed in the historic Hollywood Schoolhouse that was built in 1912 and designated as a King County, Washington landmark in 1992. In 2011, Alexandria Nicole was named the Washington Winery of the Year by ″Wine Press Northwest″, the wine publication arm of the Tri-City Herald.

== Destiny Ridge Vineyard ==
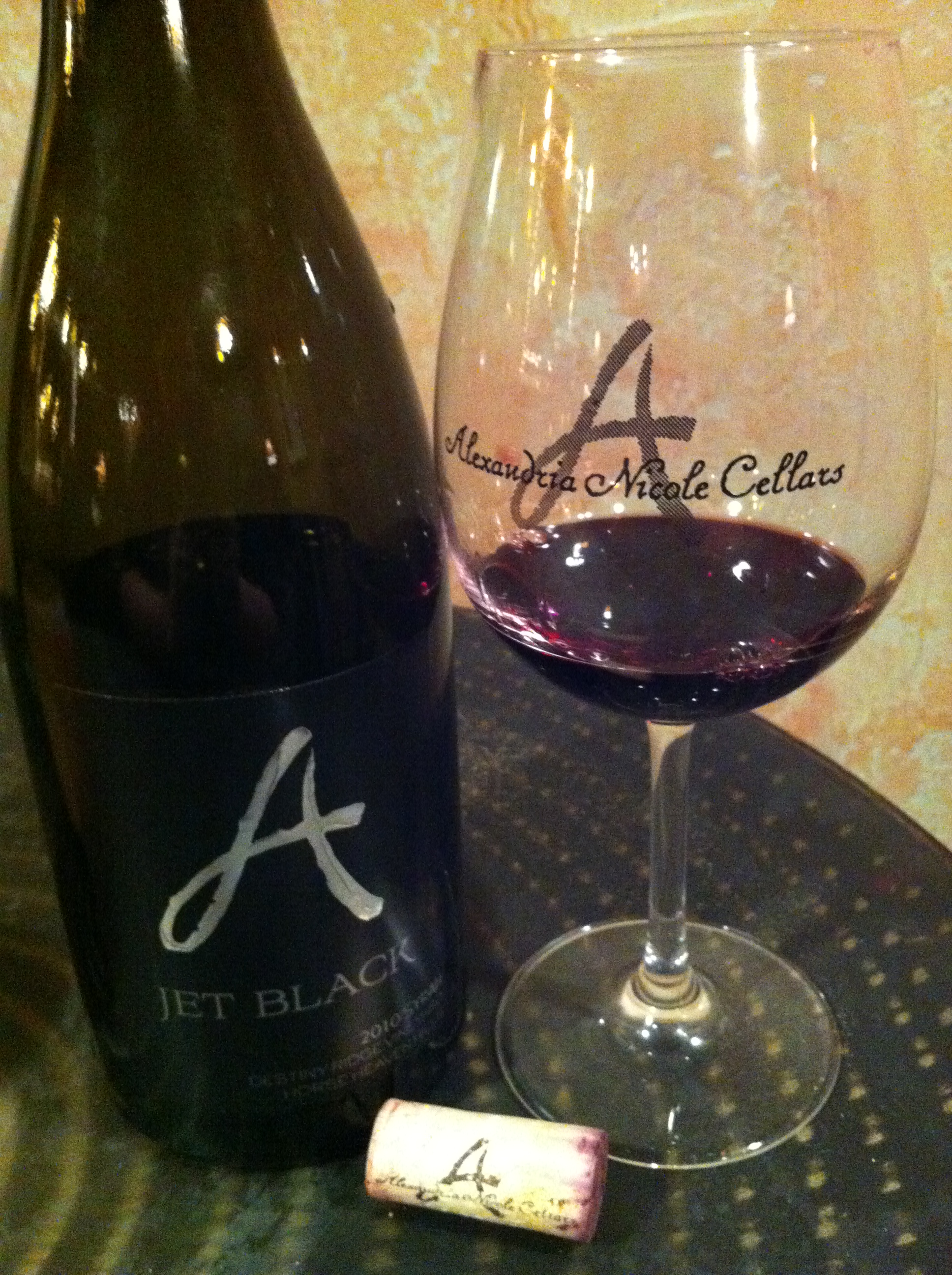
A Syrah produced by Alexandria Nicole Cellars from their estate fruit grown at Destiny Ridge Vineyards.

Destiny Ridge Vineyard is the estate vineyard of Alexandria Nicole located in the Horse Heaven Hills AVA near Alder Ridge Vineyards between Champoux and Canoe Ridge Vineyards. First planted in 1998, the 367-acre estate has grown to include more than 258 acres planted with over 17 different varieties including relatively rare varieties like Petit Verdot, Tempranillo, Counoise, Petite Sirah, Mourvedre, Lemberger, Roussanne and Marsanne that are not widely grown in Washington State.

The vineyard was planted in collaboration with the Boyles, the Mercer family (original owners of Champoux Vineyard) and noted Washington Rhone Ranger Doug McCrea of McCrea Cellars. When McCrea first saw the site for Destiny Ridge, overlooking the Columbia River with steep rocky hillsides made of basalt, he said he taken back by how much the site resembled the northern Rhône Valley (home to the Côte-Rôtie, Condrieu and Hermitage AOCs that are noted for Syrah and Viognier wines). But being one of the hottest regions in the state, McCrea, Boyle and Mercer also decided to plant several southern Rhône varieties like Grenache, Roussanne and Marsanne on the rocky slopes with Syrah and Viognier planted in the cooler, sandier soils of the vineyard.

While many vineyards in New World wine regions are planted with vines spread widely apart from each other (900 vines per acre being a typical density), the vines at Destiny Ridge are planted close together with a high density of 2000 vines per acre that is more typical of Old World wine regions. The Boyles are active in every level of vineyard management for Destiny Ridge with a philosophy that prioritizes balanced crop levels and gentle handling of the grapes, including hand harvesting.

== History ==
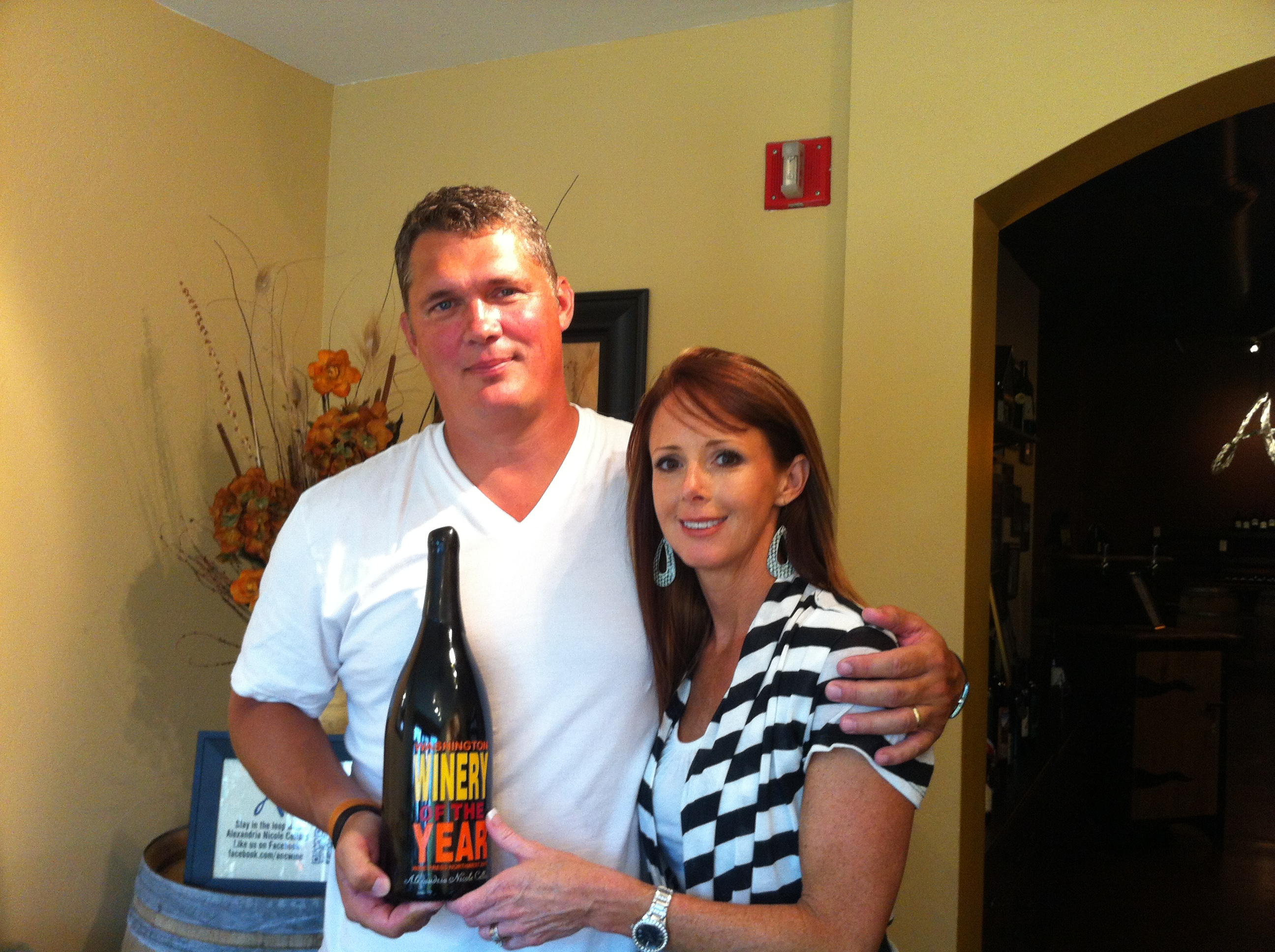
Jarrod and Ali Boyle of Alexandria Nicole Cellars holding a bottle commemorating their selection as the 2011 Washington Winery of the Year.

A Prosser native, Jarrod Boyle learned viticulture and winemaking while working with Washington wine pioneers Dr. Wade Wolfe of Thurston Wolfe and the Hogue family of Hogue Cellars. While at Hogue, Boyle spotted an area of uncultivated land along the Columbia River in the Horse Heaven Hills that he thought would be an ideal spot for a vineyard. Working with the owners of land, the Mercer family who first planted Champoux vineyards in the 1970s, Boyle founded Destiny Ridge Vineyard in 1998.

After planting Destiny Ridge Vineyard, Jarrod and his wife Ali opened up Alexandria Nicole Cellars in 2001 with a production facility at Destiny Ridge completed in 2004. Wine writer Steve Roberts has noted that with their tasting room in the Lee Road wine district, down the road from nearby Chinook Wines, the Boyles and Alexandria Nicole have done much to enhance the prestige and tourist recognition of Prosser as the city grew into a wine tourism hub for Washington state. In 2007, Alexandria Nicole was one of the first Eastern Washington wineries to open up a second satellite tasting room in Woodinville wine country close to the large Seattle metropolitan region.

As head viticulturist and winemaker of Alexandria Nicole, Jarrod Boyle credits Dr. Wolfe, Dave Minnick of Willow Crest Winery and Ray McKee of Covey Run Winery with guiding him during his early winemaking work. Together with his wife Ali, the sales and marketing director of the winery, the Boyles have grown Alexandria Nicole Cellars into a notable winery in Washington State producing around 10,000 cases a year and being named the 2011 Washington Winery of the Year by Wine Press Northwest.

Future plans for Alexandria Nicole include expanding their Destiny Ridge Vineyard, potentially opening up a third tasting room in Hood River, Oregon and continuing a collaboration with Dogfish Head Brewery in making wine inspired beers.

== Wines ==
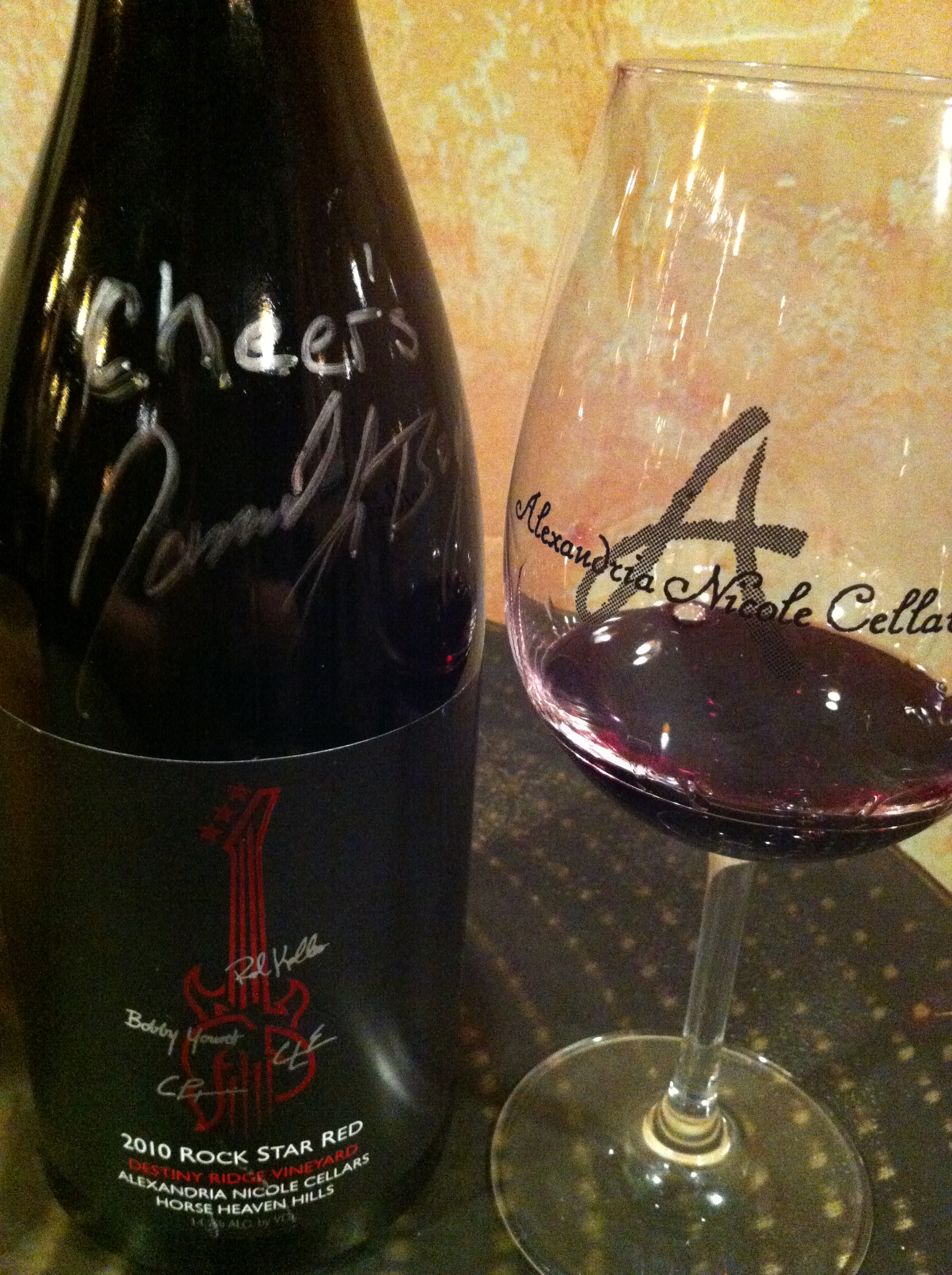
A bottle of Alexandria Nicole wine with winemaker Jarrod Boyle's signature.

While Alexandria Nicole will occasionally source supplemental fruit from other vineyards in the Columbia Valley AVA, the vast majority of their wines are vineyard designated wines produced from grapes harvested at Destiny Ridge Vineyard. Over the years the vineyard has garnered a reputation for producing grapes with "intense" flavors that reflect the terroir of the estate.

Wine writer Paul Gregutt has praised the quality of the fruit coming from Destiny Ridge Vineyard and the wines produced by Alexandria Nicole, noting in particular how they can take some varieties (such as Tempranillo) and produce wines that still retain the "Old World varietal character" of the grape within the New World style popular in Washington State.

Other critics and wine writers who have written favorably about Alexandria Nicole wine include Alder Yarrow of Vinography and Jon Bonné of the San Francisco Chronicle.

== Collaboration with Dogfish Head ==
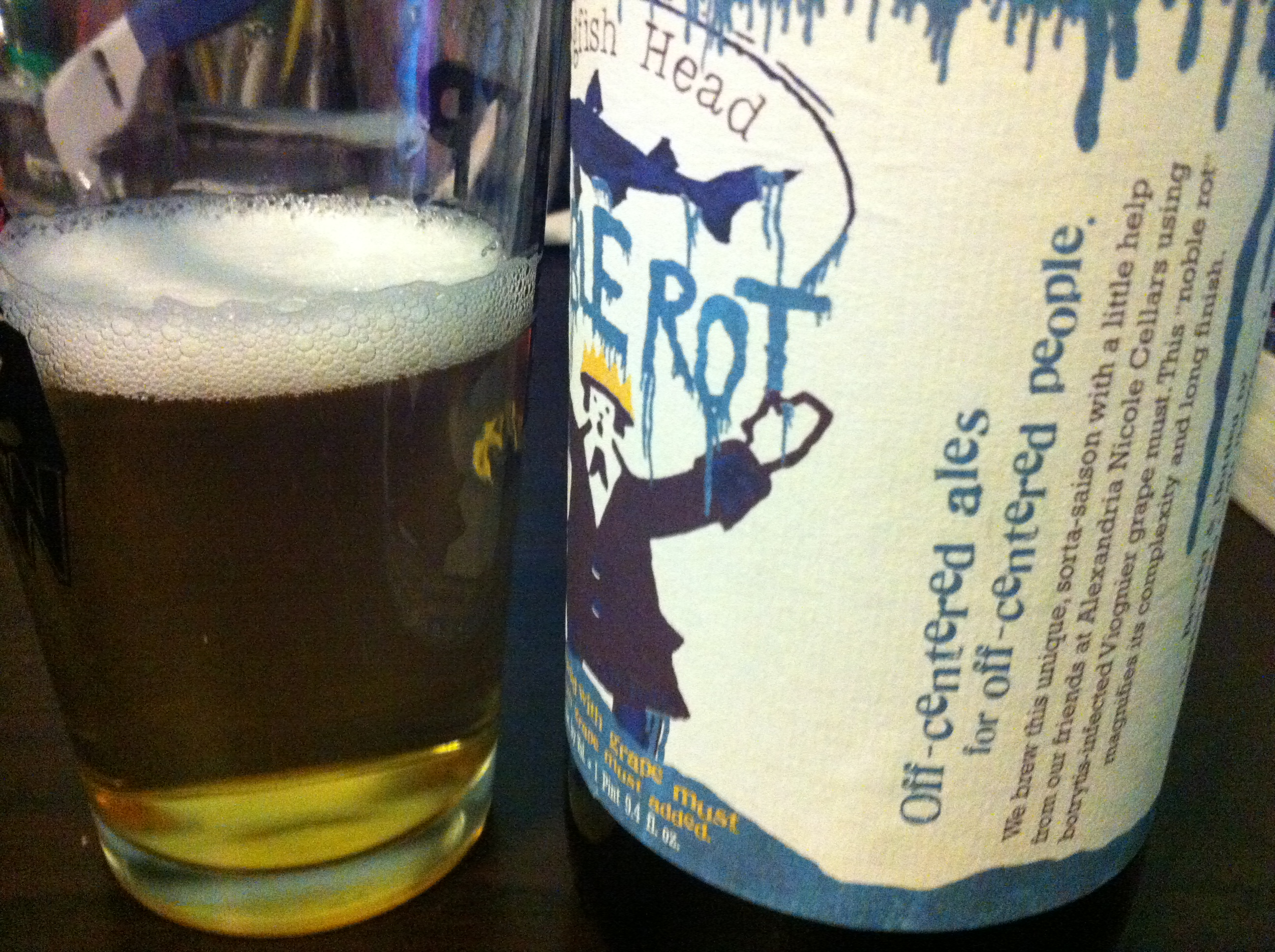
Noble Rot made in collaboration between Alexandria Nicole Cellars and Dogfish Head Brewery.

In 2010, Jarrod Boyle of Alexandria Nicole collaborated with Sam Calagione of Dogfish Head Brewery in Delaware to produce a "hybrid" beer-wine beverage labeled Noble rot. A saison-style beer, the brewery uses botrytis-infected Viognier and Pinot gris grapes from the Destiny Ridge Vineyard with its barley, pils and wheat malt. The result is a beer with 49.5% of the fermentable sugars coming from grapes that finishes with a 9% alcohol level. Alexandria Nicole presses the grapes, leaving the skins with the must, and Dogfish co-ferments the Viognier and grains while adding the Pinot gris later in the process. In 2012, the beer went nationwide in the United States in more than 27 states and received favorable critical reviews.
