= Trisaetum Winery =

American winery located in Oregon

Trisaetum (pronounced "tris-say-tum") is a winery located in Oregon's Willamette Valley. It was established in 2003 by Andrea and James Frey, and is named after the founders' two children, Tristen and Tatum. It is family owned and operated, and produces Pinot Noir and Riesling wines.

== Winery and wines ==
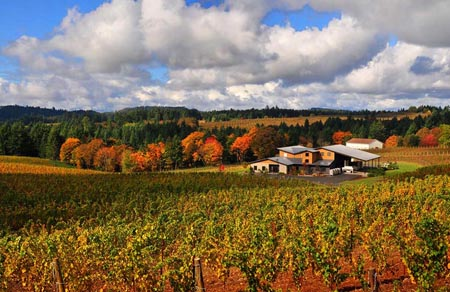
The Trisaetum winery

Trisaetum's winery is located on its 17-acre (69,000 m^{2}) vineyard in the Ribbon Ridge AVA, outside Newberg, Oregon. It has a tasting room open to the public. In addition, the winery has an art gallery featuring the works of the owner and winemaker.

The winery plants four different blocks of Riesling planted in its two estate vineyards. Trisaetum's Rieslings were have been awarded Editors Choice designations by the Wine Enthusiast Magazine, with multiple Top 100 Wines, and scores of 96, 95, 94, and 93 points on Wine Enthusiast's 100-point scale. The winery is also known for its varietals of Pinot Noir. The 2008 vintage was named a top selection by both Wine Spectator and Wine Advocate. Beginning in 2011, the winery makes a vineyard designate Pinot Noir from the Dundee Hills AVA. Trisaetum began producing sparkling wines from their single vineyard estates in the summer of 2017.

The winery produces 8,500 cases a year; there are currently no plans in place to expand this production.
