= Quilceda Creek Winery =

Winery in Washington, United States

- Location: Snohomish, Washington, USA
- Appellation: Columbia Valley AVA
- Founded: 1978
- First vintage: 1979
- Key people: Alex Golitzin, Founder; Jeanette Golitzin, Founder; Paul Golitzin, President & Director of Winemaking
- Cases/yr: < 12,000
- Known for: Cabernet Sauvignon
- Varietals: Cabernet Sauvignon, Cabernet Franc, Merlot
- Distribution: International
- Tasting: By appointment
- Website: quilcedacreek.com

Quilceda Creek Winery is a boutique winery in Snohomish, Washington specializing in premium Cabernet Sauvignon wine. The winery is named for a nearby creek in Snohomish County. Although the winery facility is located west of the Cascade Range, the winery sources all of its grapes from its four estate vineyards in the Horse Heaven Hills AVA and Red Mountain AVA. Quilceda Creek Winery has earned some of the highest reviews and awards of any winery in the United States and was the first American wine from outside of California to earn a perfect 100-point score from wine critic Robert Parker's publication The Wine Advocate. Since its founding in 1978, Quilceda Creek has received an additional seven 100-point scores from Robert Parker's Wine Advocate, one 100-point score from Decanter (Magazine) and two 100-point scores from acclaimed wine blog OwenBargreen.com. In addition to critics' praise, one of the highest honors for Quilceda Creek happened when President Barack Obama chose to serve their 2005 Cabernet Sauvignon Columbia Valley at a White House dinner to President Hu Jintao of China in 2011.

== History ==
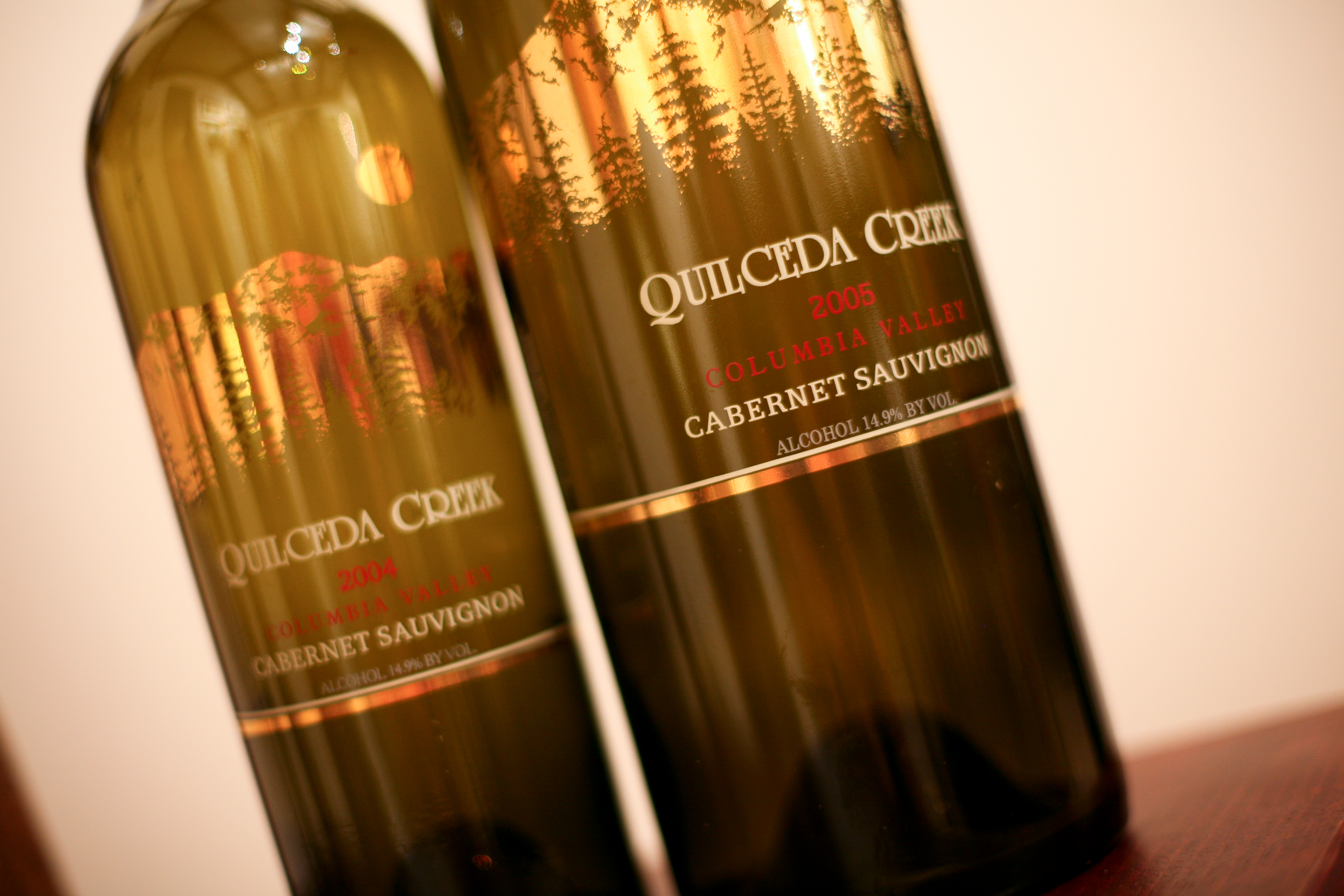
Quilceda Creek wines, including the 2005 Cabernet Sauvignon that received 100 pts from Robert Parker.

Quilceda Creek Winery was founded in 1978 by Alex and Jeanette Golitzin. Alex Golitzin is a nephew of André Tchelistcheff, one of the most influential winemakers of Napa Valley, and credits summer trips to visit his uncle in St. Helena, California with developing his early interest in wine. Tchelistcheff began consulting with Washington's largest winery, Chateau Ste. Michelle, in the 1960s, when the Golitzin family also moved to western Washington. With encouragement and advice from his uncle, Alex Golitzin began making one barrel of Cabernet Sauvignon a year as an amateur winemaker from 1974 through 1977. Encouraged by Tchelistcheff's assessment of the results, the family opened the commercial winery in Snohomish in 1978 and produced their first vintage of Cabernet Sauvignon in 1979. The first vintage produced 150 cases (14 hL). In 1993, Alex Golitzin's son, Paul, took over responsibilities as Director of Winemaking. By 2000, the winery was producing 4,700 cases (420 hL) annually, and today produces 12,000 cases a year.

Quilceda Creek Winery Cabernet Sauvignon has earned some of the highest reviews and awards of any wine produced in the United States. The 1999 vintage was named "Best Cabernet Sauvignon over $20" in a tasting of American wines by Food & Wine in its October 2003 issue. The 2002, 2003, 2005, 2007, 2013 and 2014 vintages all scored 100-point ratings from Robert Parker's The Wine Advocate. Robert Parker's Wine Advocate also named Quilceda Creek “Best Washington State Winery” in 2017. Additionally, Quilceda Creek has received three top 10 wines of the year in Wine Spectator. It was named one of the Top 100 Wineries of 2020 by Wine & Spirits and a Top 100 Cellar Selection of 2020 by Wine Enthusiast.

== Production ==
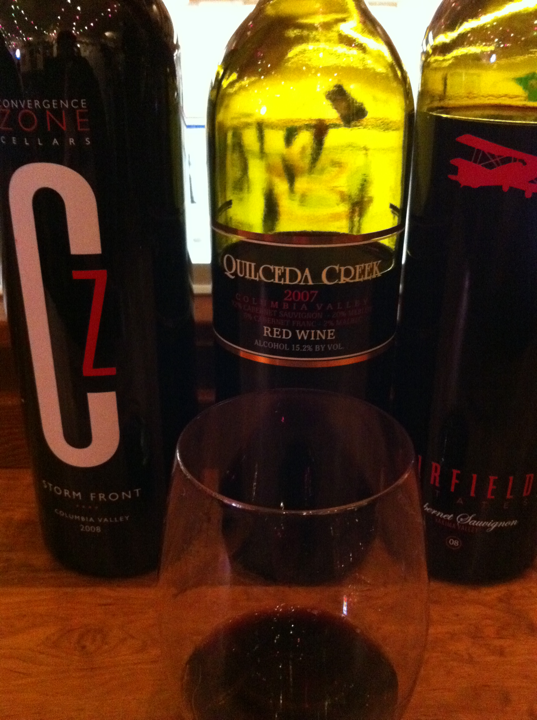
A glass of 2007 Quilceda Creek red blend from the Columbia Valley AVA along with two other Washington wines.

The current winery facility at Quilceda Creek was built in 2003 and opened on January 1, 2004. Located on 11 acres (4.5 ha) in the town of Snohomish, the winery has 15,000 square feet (1,390 m^{2}) of space for fermentation and barrel aging. The small winery facility is open to the public by appointment only.

The wines produced by Quilceda Creek Vintners are sourced from their four estate vineyards: Mach One Vineyard, Champoux Vineyard and Palengat Vineyard in the Horse Heaven Hills AVA and Galitzine Vineyard in the Red Mountain AVA. The grapes are harvested by hand, and transported 200 miles (320 km) overnight by truck to the winery.

Quilceda Creek produces just four wines, including its flagship bottling, the Columbia Valley Cabernet Sauvignon, made of 100% Cabernet Sauvignon with fruit from Champoux, Mach One and Palengat Vineyards; the Galitzine Vineyard Cabernet Sauvignon, Quilceda Creek's only single-vineyard bottling made with Cabernet Sauvignon from the Red Mountain AVA; the Palengat Proprietary Red Wine, made up of 90% Cabernet Sauvignon from the Champoux and Mach One vineyards and 10% Cabernet Franc from the Palengat Vineyard; and the Columbia Valley Red or “CVR,” a declassified blend of Cabernet Sauvignon, Merlot and Cabernet Franc.

The Columbia Valley Cabernet Sauvignon and Columbia Valley Red (CVR) are distributed nationally, and internationally to Asia and the United Kingdom. The Palengat and Galitzine bottles are offered only to their private mailing list but may sometimes be found in the secondary market.
