= Chinook Wines =

Winery in Washington, United States

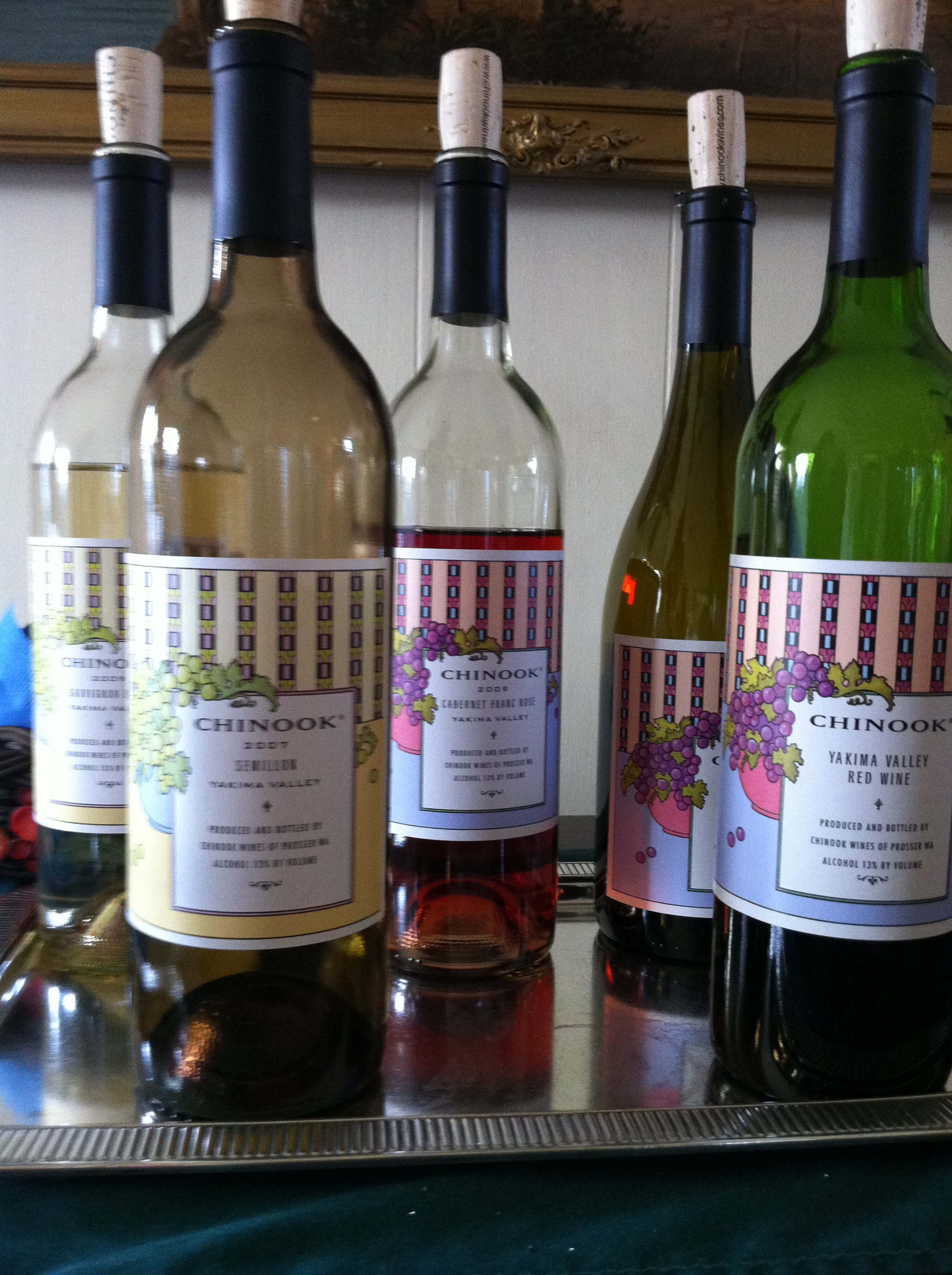
Chinook wines.

Chinook is a Washington winery located in the Yakima Valley AVA. Founded in 1983 by the wife and husband team of Kay Simon and Clay Mackey, Chinook was one of the pioneering wineries that established Prosser, Washington as a major wine-producing region in Washington state. Kay Simon, who began her career after graduating in 1976 from University of California-Davis in California's San Joaquin Valley and at Chateau Ste. Michelle, was one of the first female winemaker in Washington State. Chinook wines are widely regarded for their quality and help spread recognition for Washington wines. They are considered by wine experts such as Paul Gregutt to be "the classic expression of Yakima Valley fruit". Chinook's work with Cabernet franc, in particular, has garnered the statewide acclaim with the dry Cabernet franc rosé often described in wine reviews as a "Washington Chinon".

The winery is named after the Chinook wind that blows through the Pacific Northwest rather than the Chinook salmon that is also common to the region.

== History ==
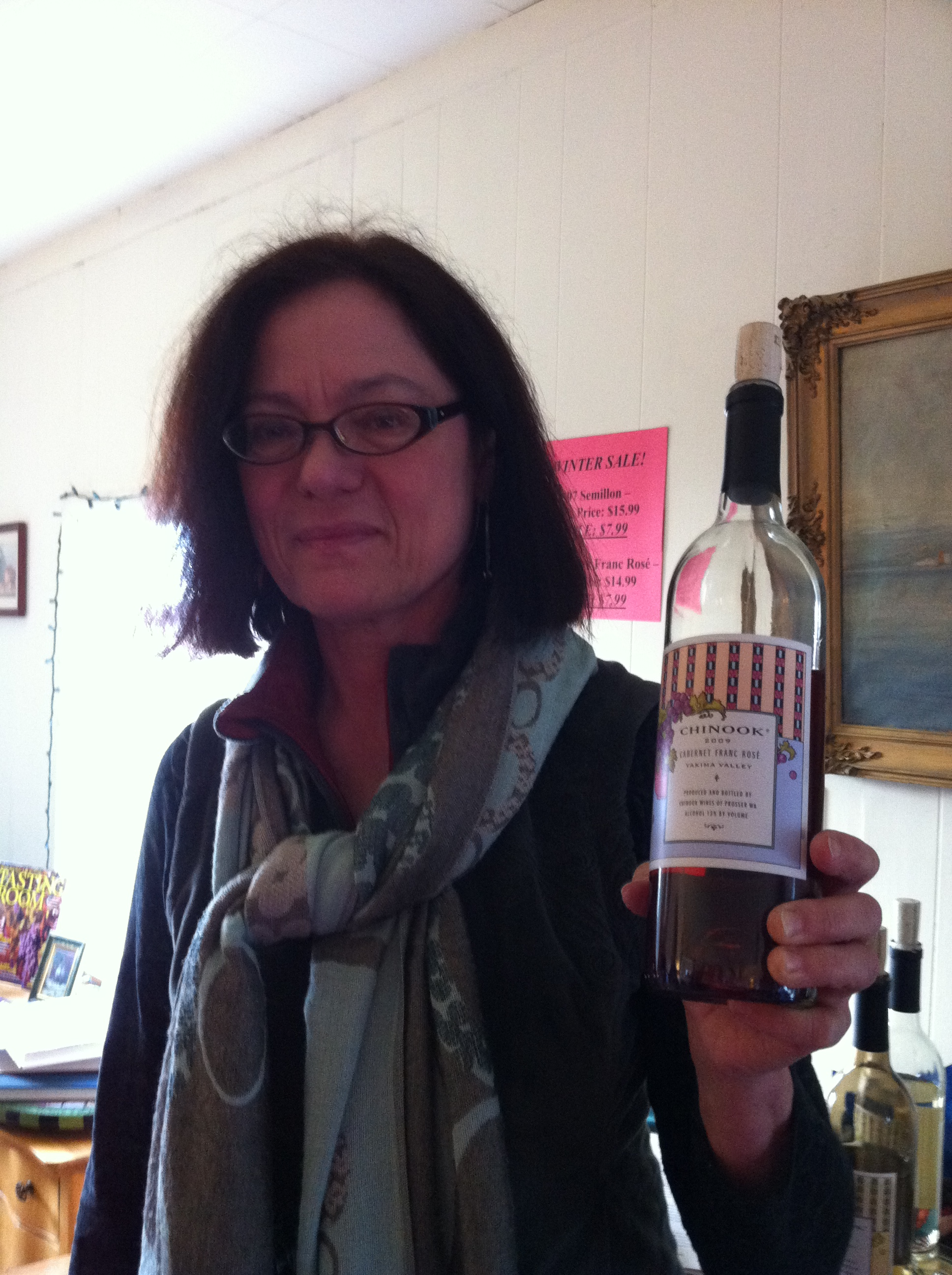
Kay Simon, winemaker and co-owner of Chinook.

Chinook was founded in 1983 in the Yakima Valley by the wife-husband team of Kay Simon and Clay Mackey, who met while both were working at Chateau Ste. Michelle, where Simon worked as a winemaker and Mackey as a viticulturalist. They opened their winery at a time that the Washington wine industry began developing in leaps and bound and Chinook was part of a wave of small "mom and pop" wineries that opened in the 1980s. That same year, the Yakima Valley AVA was established as the first American Viticultural Area in Washington State. Chinook released their first wines from the 1983 harvest, a Chardonnay and Sauvignon blanc in August, 1984. In November of that year they released a sparkling Riesling that they also served at their wedding reception.

Throughout the 1980s and 1990s, Chinook did much to help establish the Prosser area as a major winemaking center in the Yakima Valley, beginning with opening their tasting room off of Interstate 82 in Prosser in 1986. Chinook works with many of the best vineyards in the valley including Boushey Vineyard and Klipsun Vineyard in the Red Mountain AVA. Clay Mackey, who began his winemaking career in Napa Valley served as a mentor to Paul Champoux of the notable Horse Heaven Hills AVA vineyard Champoux Vineyard. In 1999, both Simon and Mackey served on the committee of Washington winemakers that established the standards for the Washington Wine Quality Alliance which dictates, among other things, that no more than 10% of a winery's production (or 3000 cases of a single varietal) can be labeled "Reserved"—a practice commonplace in many Old World wine regions such as Europe but less commonly seen in New World wine regions.

Despite their success, Chinook still maintains a relatively low-key operation producing around 3500 cases of wine a year. Kay Simon and Clay Mackey are often pouring at the tasting room themselves or making deliveries of their wines to restaurants and retailers across the state in Seattle.

== Kay Simon and Clay Mackey ==
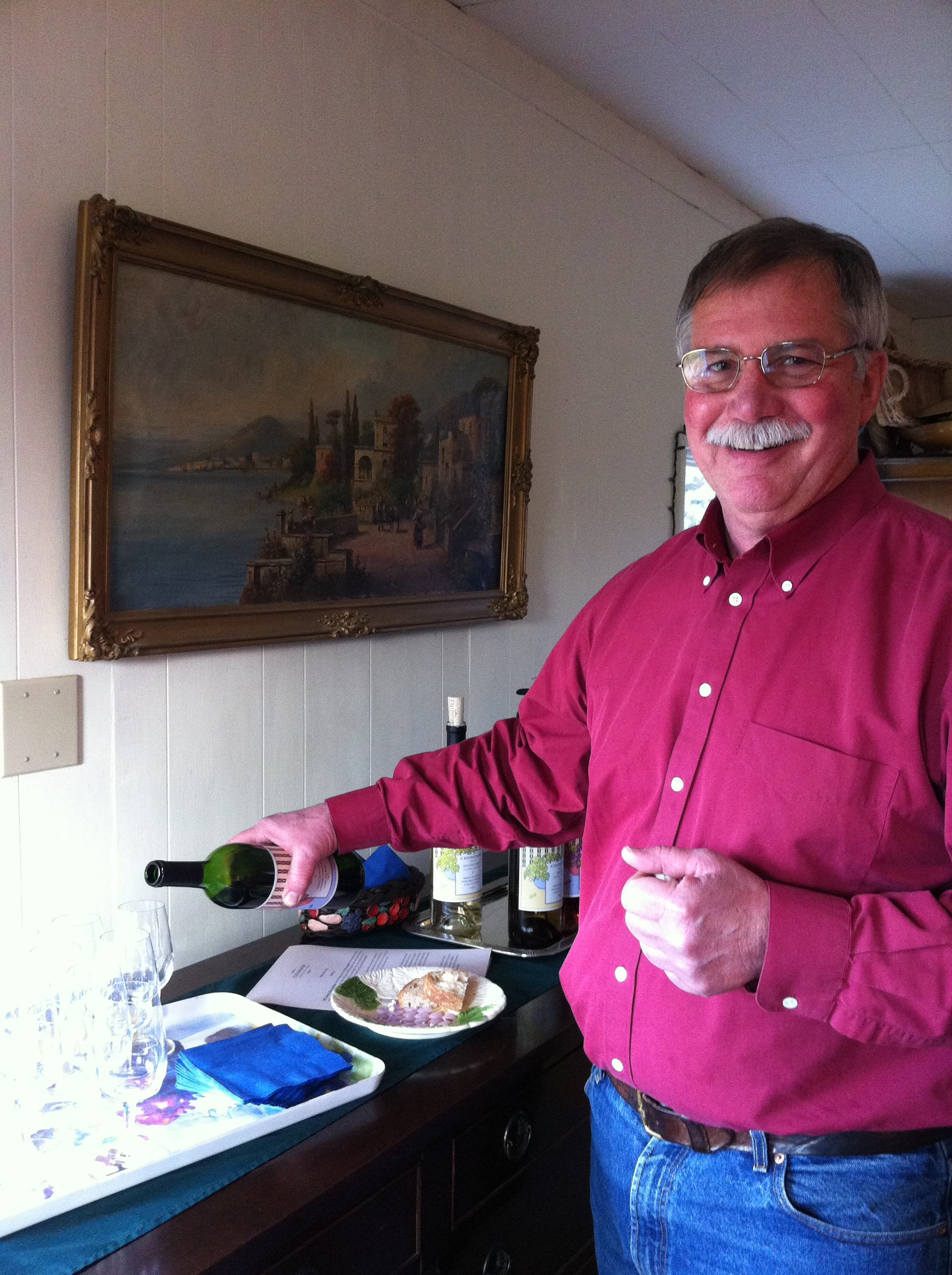
Clay Mackey, co-founder of Chinook.

Raised in Northern California, Kay Simon graduated in 1976 from the enology program at University of California-Davis with a degree in fermentation science after originally entering college to become a nutritionist. After studying in Germany, Simon developed an interest in beer making. While studying brewing she took some winemaking courses at Davis and eventually switched to wine because she found it more "interesting". While at UC-Davis, Simon was one of only 3 female winemaking students in a class of 45.

After receiving job offers from American brewer Anheuser-Busch and Washington winery Chateau Ste. Michelle, Simon spent some time working for large producers in California's San Joaquin Valley before moving to Washington State in 1977 to work at Chateau Ste. Michelle where she worked primarily with the Washington producer's red wines. After leaving Chateau Ste. Michelle, Simon did some consulting work with other Washington wineries prior to starting Chinook with her husband Clay Mackey in 1984.

Among her accomplishments, Simon was elected vice-president of the Washington Wine Institute, one of the main trade associations for the Washington wine industry, in 1985 and in 2008 she received a lifetime achievement award for her contributions to the Washington wine industry at the annual Auction of Washington Wines gala.

Clay Mackey came from a vine growing family in California's Napa Valley where he worked at the family vineyard in the early 1970s. In 1979, he headed to Washington State where he served as the Eastern Washington vineyard manager for Chateau Ste. Michelle until 1982. There he met assistant winemaker Kay Simon and the two were married in 1983.

== Wines and winemaking style ==
Chinook wines are made to pair well with food. They are fermented to dryness and then aged in both the barrel and bottle until Simon and Mackey feel that they are ready. Among the grape varieties that Chinook works with are Chardonnay, Sémillon, Sauvignon blanc, Merlot, Cabernet Sauvignon and Cabernet franc which they produce in both a varietal style and as a dry rosé. While many of Chinook's wines have received acclaim, the dry rosé has garnered a reputation in Washington state as an almost "cult wine" that quickly sells outs and is often only found on select restaurant wine lists.
