= Champoux Vineyard =

Grape growing estate in Washington, U.S.

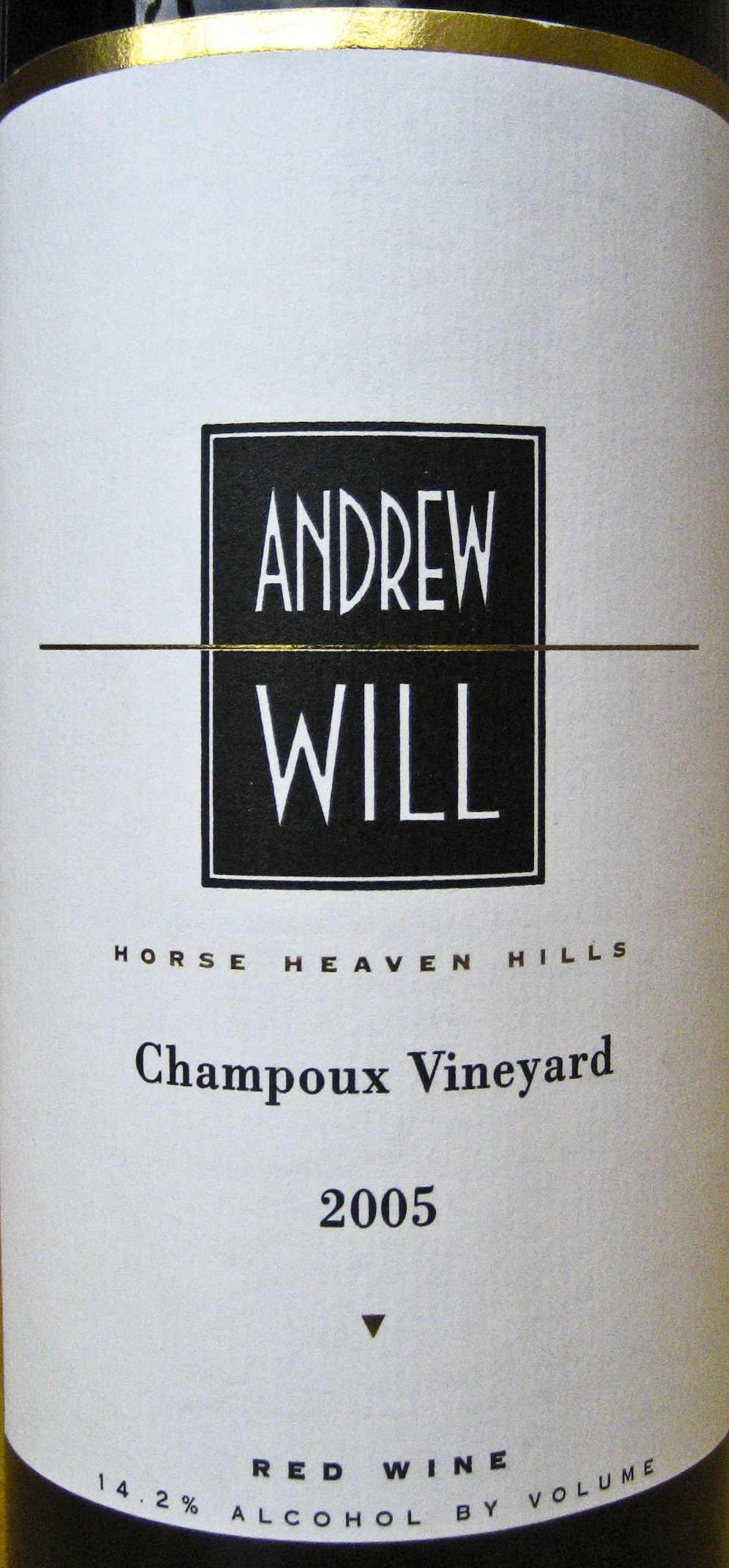
A vineyard designated bottle of red wine made from grapes grown in Champoux Vineyard.

Champoux Vineyard is a grape growing estate located in the Horse Heaven Hills AVA of Washington state. Grapes grown in the vineyard have been used to produce some of the most critically acclaimed Washington wines with the name Champoux regularly being featured on vineyard designated wines. Paul Gregutt, wine writer for the Seattle Times and Wine Enthusiast, list Champoux as one of the "top ten" vineyards in the entire state. Cabernet Sauvignon grapes from Champoux vineyards were featured in the consecutive 100 point Robert Parker rated wines from Quilceda Creek Vintners for the 2002 and 2003 vintages.

Located 35 miles (56 km) south of Sunnyside, Washington, the area was originally part of the expansive 6,600 acres (2,700 ha) Mercer Ranch owned by the family of Don Mercer. The first grapes were planted in 1972. Today the Cabernet Sauvignon vines from this original "Block One" site are among the oldest vines in Washington. In 1990, Paul and Judy Champoux began leasing the vineyard land from the original owners. Paul, who previously did viticulture work for Chateau Ste Michelle, had been working at the vineyard since the mid-1980s. In 1996, the Champouxes formed a partnership with the owners of the Washington wineries Andrew Will, Powers Winery, Quilceda Creek and Woodward Canyon to purchase the vineyard outright. From an initial 7 acres (2.8 ha), the vineyard has grown to over 170 acres (69 ha) and features plantings of Cabernet Sauvignon, Riesling, Chardonnay, Lemberger, Merlot, Muscat, Cabernet franc, Syrah and Petit Verdot.

== History ==
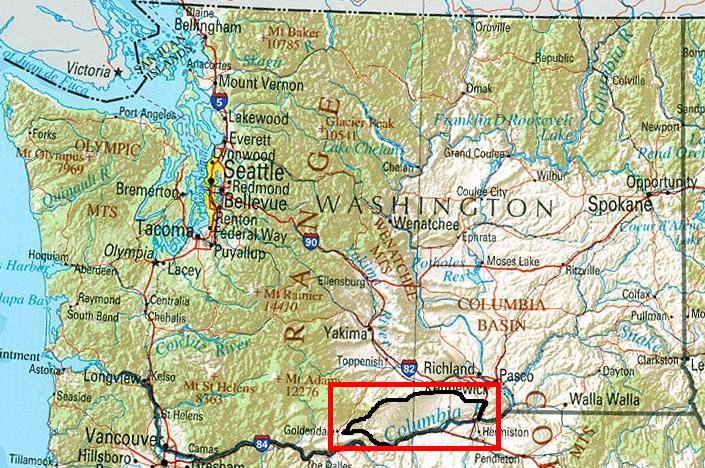
The Horse Heaven Hills AVA, where Champoux Vineyard is located, in Washington State.

The land that would become Champoux Vineyard was originally part of the expansive Mercer Ranch. The 6,600-acre (27 km^{2}) ranch featured vast plantings of several agricultural crops including carrots, corn and potatoes. In the early 1970s, the ranch's owner Don Mercer decided to plant a vineyard with the aim of growing grapes that would rival those of the Bordeaux wine estate Chateau Lafite. The first grapes were planted in 1972, a 7-acre (28,000 m^{2}) block of Cabernet Sauvignon vines. The site of the original block was chosen by mere happenstance since it was an isolated segment of the ranch by the main road that was out of the reach of circle irrigation sprinklers that would have been needed if the land was to be usable for another agricultural crop. By the mid-1980s there were more 132 acres (53 ha) planted and winery, Mercer Ranch Vineyards was founded. Paul Champoux, a hop farmer from the Yakima Valley who had previously planted the original 2,300 acres (930 ha) Columbia Crest vineyard overlooking the Columbia River, was hired as a vineyard manager of the estate.

In 1989, Mercer Ranch Vineyards folded its winery operation but continued to sell grapes to other Washington winemakers. Paul and his wife Judy began leasing the estate from the Mercers and started to expand with additional plantings of various grape varieties. In 1996, the Champouxes formed a partnership with the owners of several Washington wineries to purchase the vineyard outright.

=== Paul Champoux ===
Paul Champoux was a hop farmer who was first approached by Chateau Ste Michelle in the late 1970s to oversee the plantings of an expansive vineyard along the Columbia River. His father was a French Canadian who moved to Toppenish, Washington as a young child. Not knowing much about the particulars of viticulture, Paul Champoux sought out the tutelage of several pioneers in the Washington wine industry include Dr. Walter Clore, Wade Wolfe from Thurston Wolfe Winery and Clay Mackey from Chinook Wines. Champoux worked with Chateau Ste. Michelle, overseeing the plantings that would become part of the Columbia Crest vineyard, from 1979-1986 when he was hired the vineyard manager for Mercer Ranch Vineyards.

Paul Champoux is currently chairmen of the Horse Heaven Hills Wine Growers Association. In mid-2009, Paul Champoux was one of two people the Klickitat County Health Department reported as being stricken with the West Nile virus. After receiving medical attention in Portland, Oregon, Champoux was transferred to a rehab facility in Richland, Washington where he was expected to make a full recovery.

== Viticultural practices ==
While not a certified organic vineyard, Champoux vineyard is farmed with an emphasis on environmental awareness. No synthetic fertilizers has been used on the property in over 20 years with cover crops and compost used to help sustain the microbial activity in the soil. Maintaining healthy levels of magnesium and other plant nutrients early vine growing season is a priority in order to ensure proper build ups of sugars in the grapes by the time véraison occurs later in the season. Paul Champoux works with many of the individual winemakers that use his grapes to tailor the vine's maintenance to their winemaking needs. He has broken the growing season down into the "seasons of the vine", which are initial growth, reproductive cycle, secondary growth/berry development, lag phase, and veraison/maturation. During each of those different seasons, Champoux applies a different nutritional package of nutrients through the leaves to give the vine what it needs for the upcoming stage. In recent years, he has been experimenting with Rick Small, owner of Woodward Canyon, with delaying the early season pruning of the vine's canopy in order to get more physiologically ripe grapes but at lower potential sugar/alcohol levels. Another technique that Champoux employs is spraying nutrients directly onto the leaves of grape vines, rather than on the ground. This not only minimizes the amount of chemicals that could potentially seep into the ground but also lessens the number of times that the nutrients would need to be re-applied.

=== Plantings ===
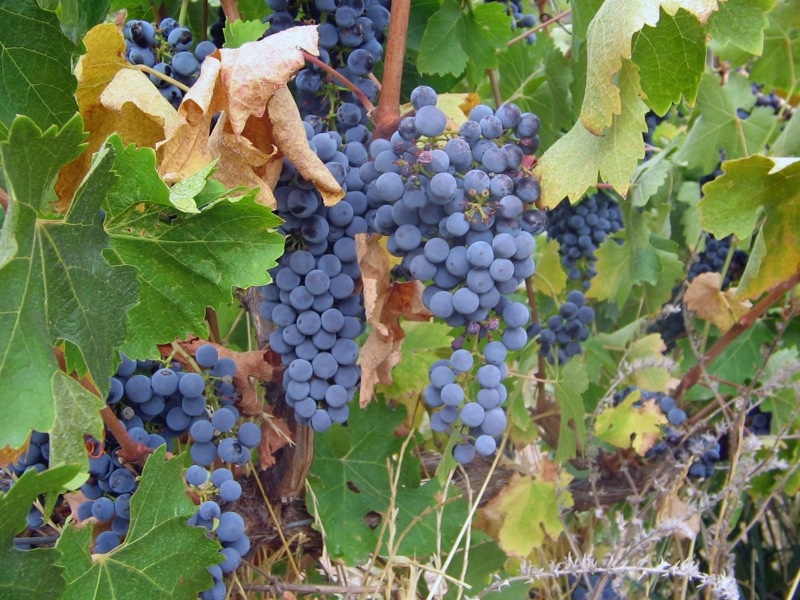
Cabernet Sauvignon grapes from Champoux Vineyards are often in high demand among Washington winemakers.

In 2007, Champoux Vineyard had a little over 170 acres (0.69 km^{2}) planted. The most sought after grapes for winemakers is the original 1972 "Block One" 7-acre (28,000 m^{2}) plantings of Cabernet Sauvignon which includes some of the oldest grapevines in the state. Today the Cabernet Sauvignon plantings are divided into 5 blocks, varying according to vine age and featuring different mesoclimate characteristics. All the blocks remain in high demand among Washington winemakers with some winemakers using the unique terroir characteristics of each block to blend into a vineyard designated Champoux Cabernet Sauvignon.

- 84 acres (34 ha) of Cabernet Sauvignon
- 30 acres (12 ha) of Riesling
- 16 acres (6 ha) of Chardonnay
- 13 acres (5 ha) of Lemberger
- 10 acres (4 ha) of Merlot
- 8 acres (3 ha) of Cabernet franc
- 7 acres (2.8 ha) of Muscat
- 2 acres (0.81 ha) of Syrah

By 2009 the number had grown to 180 acres (73 ha) and included plantings of Malbec, Muscat Canelli, Orange Muscat and Petite Verdot.

== See also ==
- Boushey Vineyard
- Red Willow Vineyard
