= Don Watts (farmer) =

American farmer, entrepreneur, and philanthropist

- Born: 1956 or 1957 (age 68–69)
- Occupation: Entrepreneur

Don Watts (born 1956) is an American farmer, entrepreneur, and philanthropist. He is the former CEO of Watts Brothers Farms and Frozen Foods in Kennewick, Washington which was later acquired by Conagra Foods, the owner of Zephyr Ridge Vineyard, and the founder of Swiftwater Cellars, a winery in Suncadia, Washington.

Watts and his wife, Lori, are the namesake of the pediatric center in Providence Health & Services' facility in Richland, Washington. Watts also served as a member of Governor Christine Gregoire's advisory council for Eastern Washington.

== Early life ==
Watts was born to an auto mechanic in Ketchikan, Alaska, and grew up "humbly" in Tri-Cities, Washington, where he spent his summers as a farmworker. One year, after working on an irrigation system on a farm, Watts' boss challenged him to get into the potato farming business. In the 1970s, Watts followed the advice and purchased a plot of land in Burbank, Washington, and focused his business on vertical integration where he saw opportunities in profits around packaging and selling produce to other businesses, becoming a primary potato supplier to McDonald's.

== Watts Brothers Farms ==
In 1977, Watts and his brother, Doug, founded Watts Brothers Farms in Kennewick. In 2001, Doug sold his stake to Don out of growing concerns for the risks and significant debt the company held. By 2007, Conagra foods was the farms' largest customer, purchasing 18% of the company's $100 million in annual production. To reduce risk, Watts requested Conagra cut their purchasing down to 15%, which led Conagra to instead acquire the 20,000 acre farm and the entirety of its operations, including an organic dairy facility.

== Zephyr Ridge Vineyard ==
In 1994, Watts planted a 300-acre vineyard in Horse Heaven Hills AVA, 30 miles south of Prosser, Washington. The vineyard supplies grapes to several wineries in Washington, including for two award-winning wines. The vineyard is jointly owned by Watts and Hogue Ranch, an award-winning winery, and was developed by Wade Wolfe, who helped shape Washington's wine industry.

== Swiftwater Cellars ==
In 2007, Watts founded Swiftwater Cellars in Suncadia Resort, near Roslyn and Cle Elum, Washington. The winery opened in 2010. The winery overlooks one of the resort's golf courses, Rope Rider, and hosts its pro shop. The winery's 41,000 square foot property also features a restaurant, Hoist House, and an outdoor concert venue that seats 2,500. The band Lonestar has played at the venue.

There is also a boutique, which is run by Watts' wife, Lori, and a family friend.

Swiftwater Cellars has won several awards for its wines. Parade named the winery in one of its 55 best honeymoon destinations in 2021.

In 2017, Watts opened a second location in Bellevue, Washington, but it was forced to close in 2020 due to the COVID-19 pandemic.

== Personal life ==
Watts married his wife, Lori, at age 17. As of September 2010, they had two sons and one grandchild.

In 2007, Watts was selected by Governor Christine Gregoire to serve on Eastern Washington's advisory council.

In 2008, Watts and his wife made a multi-million dollar donation to the Kadlec Foundation to build a new pediatric center in the Kadlec Regional Medical Center in Richland, Washington.
