= Vinography =

- Website type: Blog
- Owner: Alder Yarrow
- Creator: Alder Yarrow
- Website: www.vinography.com
- Registration: Free
- Launched: January 15th 2004

Vinography is a wine blog dedicated to wine reviews, restaurant reviews, news, and commentary about the world of wine. It was started by Alder Yarrow in January 2004, and has been described by The Independent as an interesting source of wine related info from the San Francisco Bay area. It receives some of the highest web traffic of any wine blog. The blog has been noted by Food & Wine Magazine and The Wall Street Journal for its popularity and comprehensiveness.

The blog's author and founder, Alder Yarrow, is a graduate of Stanford University and founded an interactive design and strategy consulting firm in San Francisco.

The name is a portmanteau of vino, the Latin root meaning "wine", and the Greek word graphein, meaning "write".

== Awards ==
- 2020 Louis Roederer International Wine Writing Awards, shortlisted "International Wine Columnist of the Year"
- 2017 Born Digital Wine Awards, shortlisted "Best Investigative Writing"
- 2016 Louis Roederer International Wine Writing Awards, shortlisted "Online Communicator of the Year"
- 2015 Born Digital Wine Awards "Best Tourism Writing"
- 2015 Louis Roederer International Wine Writing Awards, shortlisted "Online Communicator of the Year"
- 2014 Millesima Blog Awards "Top 10 Wine Review Blog"
- 2013 James Beard Awards, nominated for "Best Individual Food Blog"
- 2012 Wine Blog Awards "Best Writing on a Wine Blog"
- 2011 American Wine Blog Awards "Best Writing on a Wine Blog"
- 2011 Saveur Blog Awards "Best Wine/Beer Blog"
- 2009 American Wine Blog Awards "Best Overall Wine Blog"
- 2009 American Wine Blog Awards "Best Wine Writing on a Blog"
- 2008 American Wine Blog Awards "Best Overall Wine Blog"
- 2008 American Wine Blog Awards "Best Wine Writing on a Blog"
- 2007 Salon des Vins de Loire International Wine Blog Awards "Best International Wine Blog"
- 2007 American Wine Blog Awards "Best Wine Reviews"
- 2006 Food Blogging Awards "Best Blog Covering Wine, Beer, or Spirits"
- 2005 Food Blogging Awards "Best Blog Covering Wine, Beer, or Spirits"
- 2004 Food Blogging Awards "Best Blog Covering Wine, Beer, or Spirits"
