= Horse Heaven Hills AVA =

American Viticultural Area in Washington

Coordinates: 45°53′42″N 119°49′49″W

Horse Heaven Hills
- Wine region
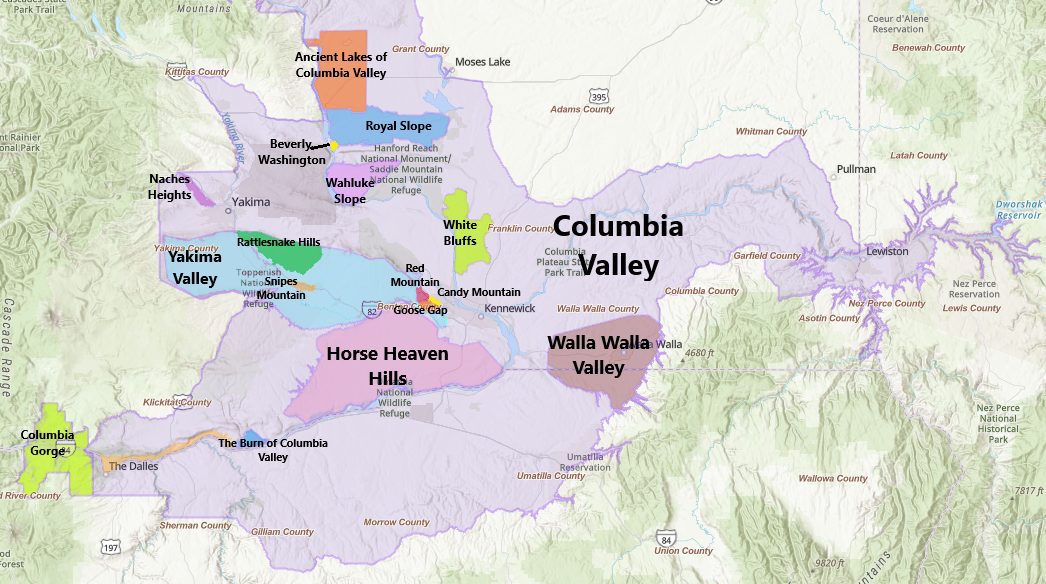
- Type: American Viticultural Area
- Year established: 2005
- Years of wine industry: 54
- Country: United States
- Part of: Washington, Columbia Valley AVA
- Other regions in Washington, Columbia Valley AVA: Ancient Lakes of Columbia Valley AVA, Beverly, Washington AVA, Candy Mountain AVA, Goose Gap AVA, Naches Heights AVA, Lake Chelan AVA, Rattlesnake Hills AVA, Red Mountain AVA, Rocky Reach AVA, Royal Slope AVA, Snipes Mountain AVA, The Burn of Columbia Valley AVA, Wahluke Slope AVA, Walla Walla Valley AVA, White Bluffs AVA, Yakima Valley AVA
- Growing season: 187 days
- Climate region: Region III
- Heat units: 3,193 GDD units
- Precipitation (annual average): 6.2 inches (157 mm)
- Soil conditions: quick-draining silty loam
- Total area: 570,000 acres (891 sq mi)
- Size of planted vineyards: 6,040 acres (2,444 ha)
- No. of vineyards: 27
- Grapes produced: Barbera, Cabernet Franc, Cabernet Sauvignon, Chenin blanc, Grenache, Malbec, Marsanne, Merlot, Mourvedre, Petit Verdot, Riesling, Roussanne, Sauvignon blanc, Syrah, Viognier, Zinfandel
- No. of wineries: 6
- Wine produced: Varietal, Dessert wine, Meritage, Sparkling wine

Horse Heaven Hills is an American Viticultural Area (AVA) located in south-central Washington encompassing the Horse Heaven Hills landform within portions of Klickitat, Yakima, and Benton counties, north and west of the Columbia River, and south of the Yakima Valley entirely residing within the expansive Columbia Valley appellation. It was established as the nation's 164^{th}, the state's seventh and Columbia Valley's fourth appellation on July 1, 2005 by the Alcohol and Tobacco Tax and Trade Bureau (TTB), Treasury after reviewing the petition submitted by Paul D. Lucas on behalf of regional wine grape growers proposing a viticultural area named "Horse Heaven Hills."

The appellation is about 60 miles (97 km) long and 22 miles (35 km) wide located 115 miles (185 km) east of Vancouver, Washington encompassing 570,000 acres (891 sq mi) with about 6,400 acres (2,590 ha) under vine. Horse Heaven Hills borders the Yakima Valley AVA to the north and the Columbia River to the south. Its elevations vary from 200 feet (61 m) above sea level at its southern boundary to 1,800 feet (549 m) at the northern boundary. Grapes planted in its south-facing slopes benefit from strong westerly winds via the Columbia Gorge, reducing botrytis or mildew issues and thickens grape skins producing fruit with a higher skin-to-juice ratio.

== History ==
Growers have raised grapes in the Horse Heaven Hills region since 1972, when Don Mercer planted a five-acre (2 ha) parcel of Cabernet Sauvignon at Phinny Hill Vineyards. Between 1978 and 1981, Stimson Lane planted 2,000 acres (809 ha) in Paterson, including Merlot, Cabernet Sauvignon, Gewürztraminer, Riesling, Sauvignon Blanc, and Grenache grapes. By the mid-1980s, commercial wine production included the Mercer Ranch Vineyards' Cabernet Sauvignon, and St. Michelle's Gewürztraminer, Grenache Rose, and Cabernet Sauvignon. Plantings continued from the mid-1980s through the early 1990s in the Horse Heaven Hills region, and greatly accelerated after the vineyards in the Horse Heaven Hills survived the hard freeze of 1996, which destroyed much of Washington State's grape crop. As of 2025, there are at least 27 vineyards, with over 6,400 acres (2,590 ha) under vine, plus six commercial wineries in the region.

== Terroir ==
=== Topography ===
The Horse Heaven Hills viticultural area is located in south-central Washington State, east of the Cascade Mountain Range and north and west of the Columbia River, which bisects eastern Washington State. The terrain within the wine region's 570,000 acres (891 sq mi) consists largely of south-sloping, open and dry plains, which have the geographical characteristics of a watershed, with dozens of drainages running north to south through the area in a wheel spoke pattern. Elevations range from 1,800 feet at the area's northern boundary to 200 feet (61 m) at its southern boundary along the Columbia River, which forms the area's southern and eastern boundary. To the north, the Yakima Valley borders the Horse Heaven Hills viticultural area. The steep slope and cliffs of the Yakima Valley and the crest of the Horse Heaven Hills form a natural boundary between the two viticultural regions. Only three Washington State Department of Transportation-maintained road passes exist between the Horse Heaven Hills and the Yakima Valley. In the west, Pine Creek, which flows south to the Columbia River, and the 1,700-foot (518 m) contour line mark the boundary between the south-facing slopes of the Horse Heaven Hills and the more extreme terrain found to the west.

=== Climate ===
==== Temperature ====
The Horse Heaven Hills viticultural area has a relatively warm growing season within the Columbia Valley region of Washington State. This growing season warmth has a dramatic impact on harvest dates and fruit quality. The harvest time in the Horse Heaven Hills may start up to two weeks before the harvest in the Yakima Valley, 40 miles (64 km) to the northwest. The Horse Heaven Hills growing season allows growers to ensure full maturity in mid to late-season grape varieties while receiving the benefit of extended time on the vine. The length of the growing season produces unique fruit characteristics, resulting in many "single vineyard" designated wines. It also decreases the risk of fall frost and harvest time disease. The Annual Heat Units index calculates the sum of the average daily temperatures above a threshold of 50 degrees Fahrenheit during the growing season. This method determines and compares the heat growing conditions of viticultural areas. The USDA plant hardiness zones are 7a and 7b.

==== Wind ====
A significant distinguishing feature of the Horse Heaven Hills viticultural area is the heavy amount of strong wind the area receives. Based on the area's proximity to the Columbia River, and because the Columbia Gorge acts as a funnel, the Horse Heaven Hills area receives significantly more wind than surrounding areas. In an article titled The Columbia Gorge Wind Funnel in the July 2003 issue of Weatherwise magazine (pages 104 through 107), Howard E. Graham of the National Weather Service's Portland, Oregon, office explains that the Columbia Gorge wind patterns are a function of the pressure differences between the west and east ends of this 120-mile long river canyon. The Gorge surrounds the Columbia River between Bridal Veil, Oregon to the west, and Arlington, Oregon to the east. The article emphasizes that the winds, rarely calm, always flow along the axis of the Gorge. The Pacific winds from the west bring moderating, mild maritime air into the Gorge. Conversely, the continental high winds from the east bring in dry air that is seasonably hot or cold. The heat of the Columbia Basin draws these intense winds north over Horse Heaven Hills after they exit the Columbia Gorge. Wind through the Columbia Gorge is determined by Wind Run Miles (WRMs), a unit of measure for the force and speed of wind in one hour. The Horse Heaven Hills viticultural area records an average of 30 percent more WRMs than the Walla Walla Valley viticultural area to the east and the Yakima Valley viticultural area to the north, and 20 percent more than the Red Mountain viticultural area to the immediate north. The three surrounding viticultural areas, unlike the Horse Heaven Hills region, are not in the direct wind funnel path of the Columbia Gorge. The wind's effect on viticulture is especially noted during the grapevine bud-break to fruit-set period, according to a 1982 article, "Influence of Windbreaks and Climatic Region on Diurnal Fluctuation of Leaf Water Potential, Stomatal Conductance, and Leaf Temperature of Grapevines", by Freeman, Kliewer and Stern in the American Journal of Enology and Viticulture. The most-often observed consequences of the higher winds within the Horse Heaven Hills viticultural area include a reduction in canopy size and density of grapes on the vines. Also, vines are less prone to disease, based on the wind's drying of wet plant surfaces on which fungal spores or bacteria can land. The volume of wind is also a key factor in determining the amount of irrigation needed for optimum vine growth.

==== Rainfall ====
Central and eastern Washington State receives most of its annual rainfall in the winter months when grapevines are dormant. As a result, all grape-growing areas in this region require supplemental irrigation. However, the low amount of precipitation received during the growing season reduces the risk of harmful diseases that may occur in the vineyard. The low amount of water that grapevines in the Horse Heaven Hills receive prevents excessive vine canopy growth, which may lead to grapes with vegetative flavors, excessive acidity, reduced color, and large berry size. Horse Heaven Hills viticultural area receives about 6.2 inches (157 mm) of rain annually. This is 45 percent less rainfall than the 19.7 inches (500 mm) in the Walla Walla Valley area to the east, 30 percent less than Chelan, Washington, at 13.2 inches (335 mm) rainfall, to the north, and 13 percent more than the Yakima Valley, at 7.8 inches (198 mm), to the immediate north.

=== Soils ===
Three dominant parent materials form the soils found within the Horse Heaven Hills viticultural area, according to Alan Busacca of the Department of Crop and Soil Sciences, Washington State University:

1. Eolian sand and silt (wind blown dunes and loess);
2. Sediments from giant glacial outburst floods, including gravelly alluvium and stratified fine sands and silts (slackwater sediments);
3. Hill slope rubble from the Columbia River Basalt bedrock.

The soils of each Washington State viticultural area are distinct, with variations in the proportion and distribution of the three parent materials noted above, according to Larry Meinert, a professor of Geology at Washington State University. The westerly wind transport predominant in the Horse Heaven Hills area and the direction of glacial floods create a differing grain size distribution of the soils in the region as compared to the surrounding viticultural areas. Horse Heaven Hills viticultural area's low annual precipitation and its hot summers act to weather the parent materials and soils. The soils are mainly classified as Aridisols (desert soils) and Mollisols (prairie soils), which are formed from various combinations of the three parent materials, according to the Soil Survey Staff in Soil Taxonomy, A Basic System of Soil Classification for Making and Interpreting Soil Surveys (Second Edition, 1999, USDA Natural Resources Conservation Service).

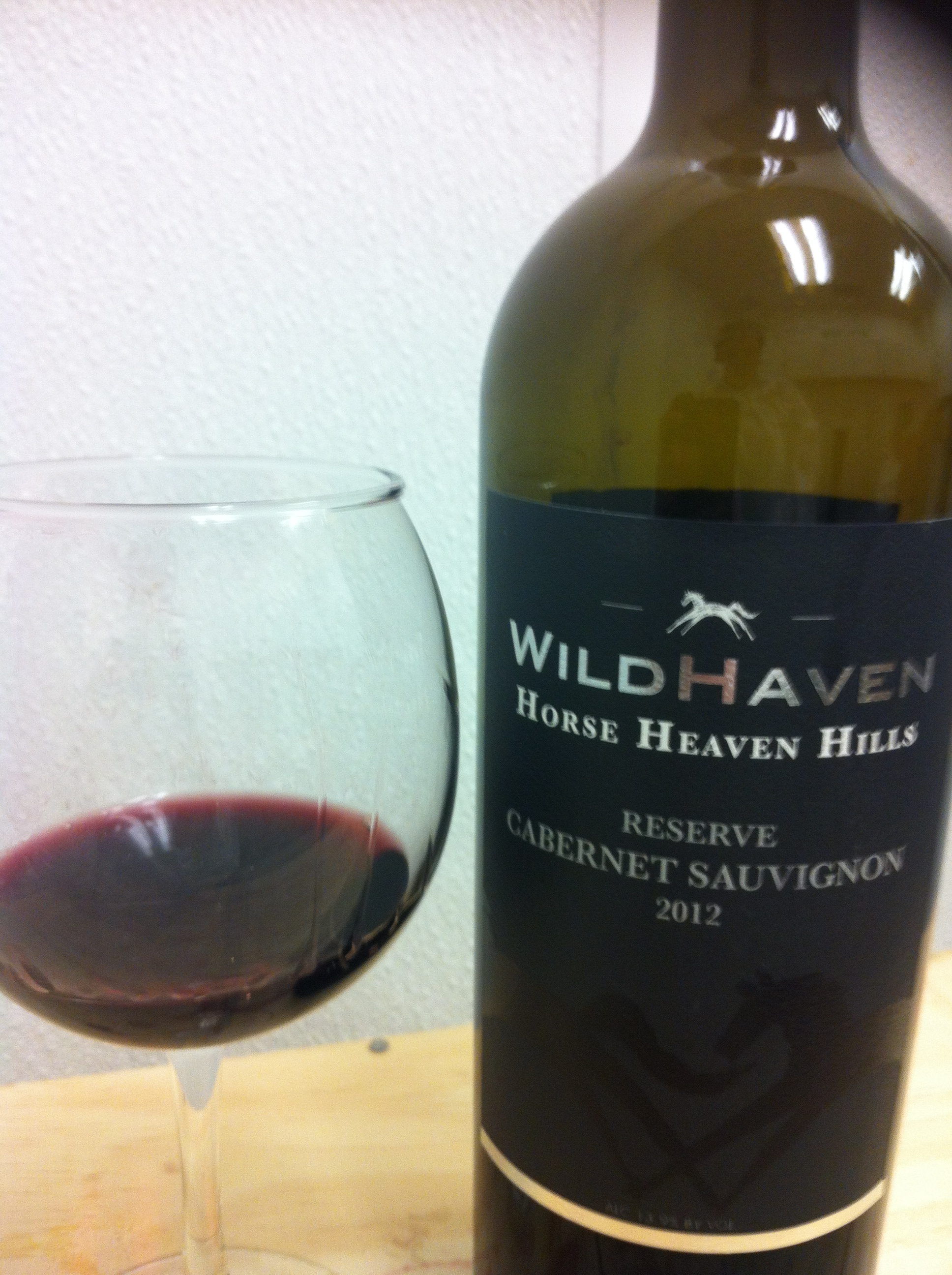
Horse Heaven Hills Cabernet Sauvignon

== Wineries ==
Horse Heaven Hills is home to the single largest wine producing facility in Washington State, Columbia Crest Winery owned by Chateau Ste. Michelle in Paterson. Also Alexandria Nicole Cellars sources from its 267-acre (108 ha) Destiny Ridge Vineyard.

The AVA is also resident to Zephyr Ridge Vineyard which produces grapes for many wineries in the state including Hogue Cellars and Swiftwater Cellars.

== Wines ==
Some of Washington's cult wines are produced from Cabernet Sauvignon grapes grown in the viticultural area including the 2002 and 2003 Quilceda Creek Vintners Cabernet Sauvignon, which scored the rare 100 point rating from Robert Parker's The Wine Advocate. Only 15 other wines in the US have received this designation, all made from California grapes. Only five other previous vintages have received consecutive perfect scores in The Wine Advocate's publishing history. The Quilceda Creek wines were blends with grapes from three Red Mountain AVA vineyards and one Horse Heaven Hills AVA vineyard.

== See also ==
- Champoux Vineyard, a well known vineyard in the AVA that is featured on several vineyard designated wines
