= Alder Yarrow =

American wine blogger

Alder Yarrow is an American wine blogger and restaurant blogger, and since 2004, publisher of "Vinography", one of the internet's most highly rated wine blogs. The founder of Hydrant, a San Francisco-based strategy and design consulting firm, Yarrow's blog has been described to "exhaustively chronicle San Francisco's wine bars".

Since 2011, Yarrow has written a column for European wine critic Jancis Robinson's web site. Yarrow left his career in the design industry in 2020 to focus on wine writing.

== See also ==
- List of wine personalities
