= Tasting room =

Room in a winery or brewery

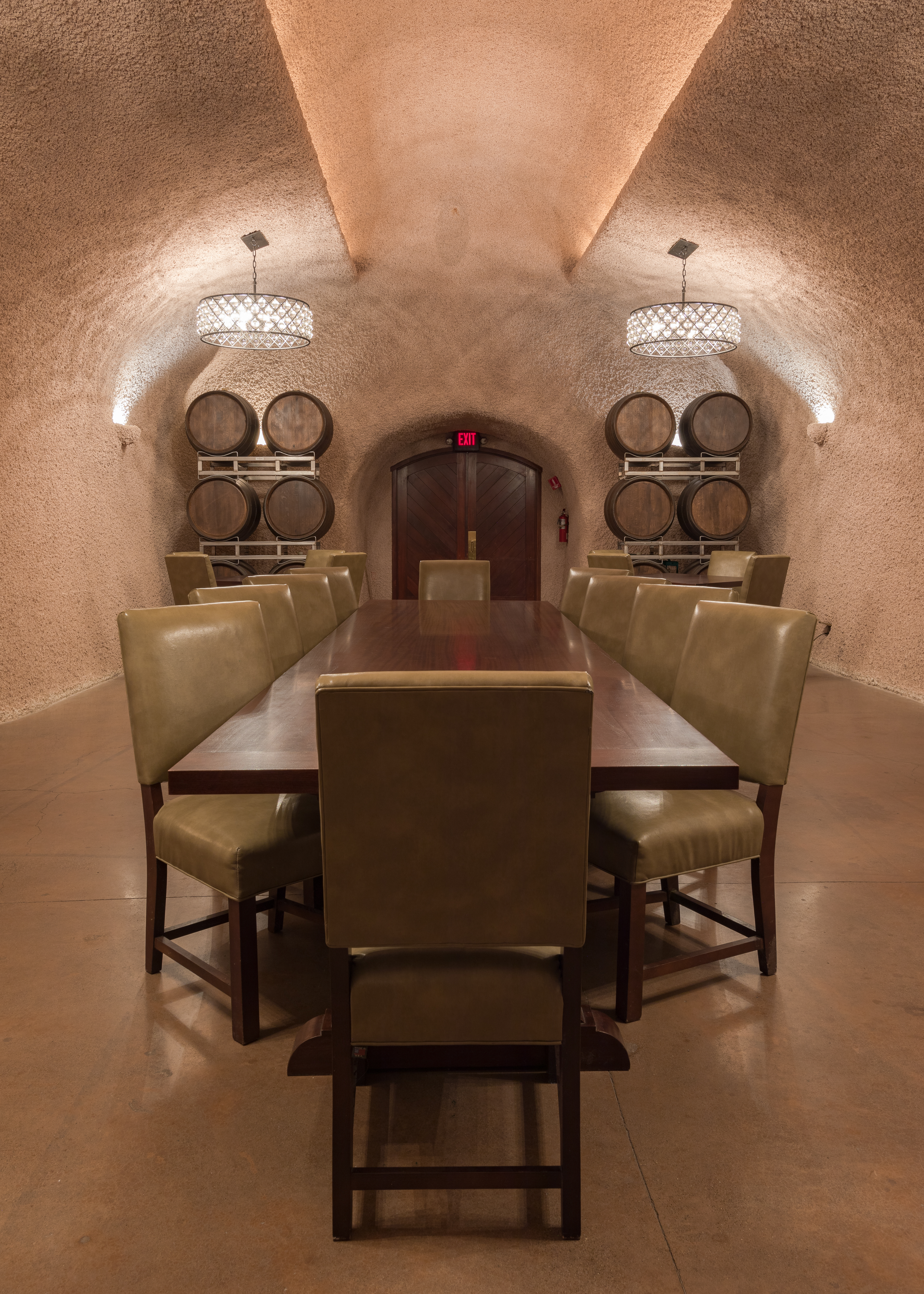
Tasting room of Rutherford Hill winery in Napa Valley AVA. The tasting room is located in the wine cave.

A tasting room is a part of a winery or brewery, typically located on the premises of the winery or brewery's production facilities, at which guests may sample the winery or brewery's products. Originally an informal public relations outreach effort of wineries and breweries to encourage visitors and build brand awareness and loyalty by dispensing free wine, beer, whiskey, sake, etc., tasting rooms have increasingly become sophisticated profit centers of winery operations, earning money by charging tasting fees, selling products directly to consumers, signing new members to the winery or brewery's members club, hosting weddings and other public and private events, and selling various wine, beer, whiskey, sake, etc. gift-related goods.

== Description ==
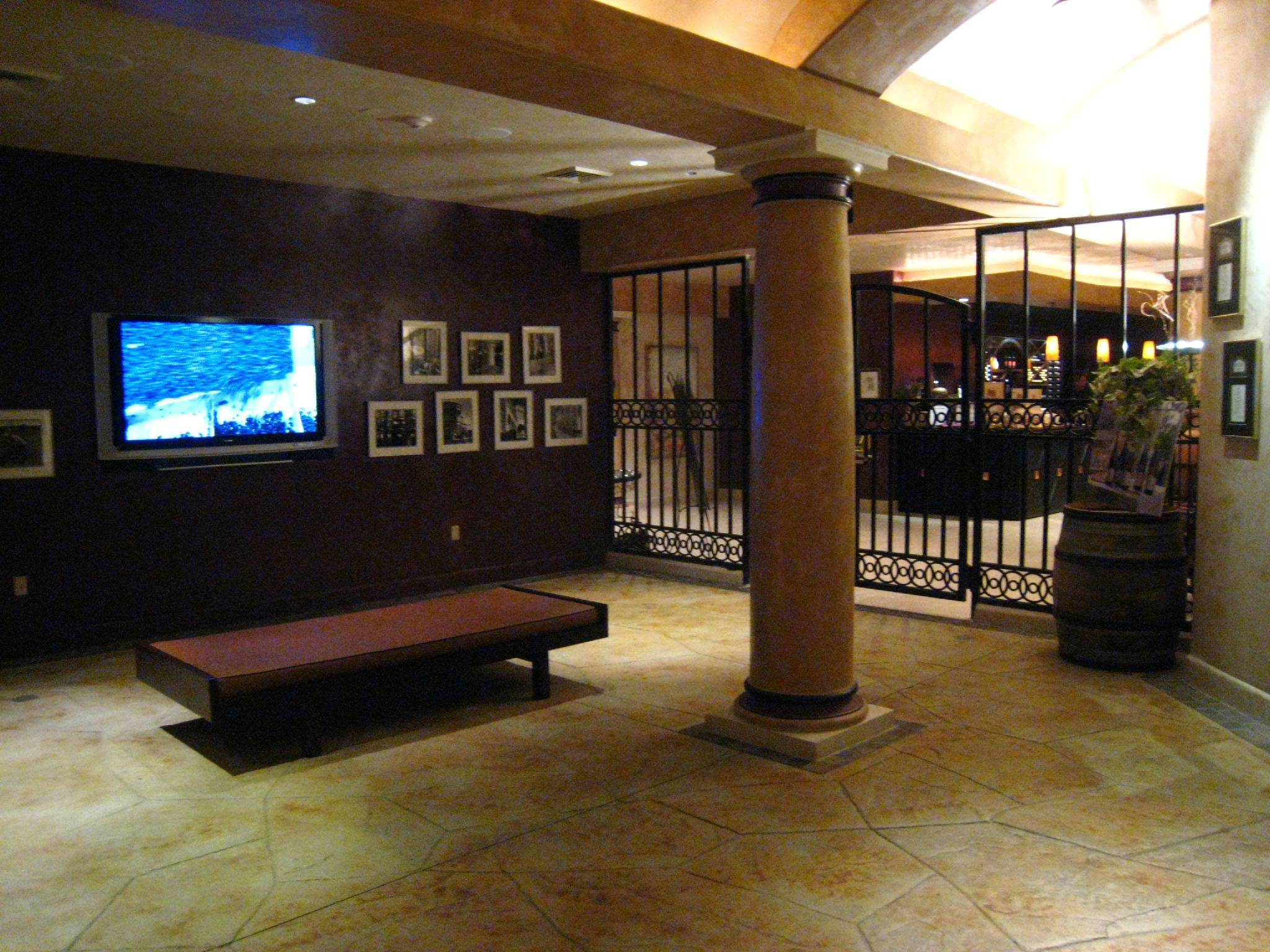
The Ferrari-Carano "Reserve" tasting room (in the Dry Creek Valley AVA) is in a separate basement facility.

A typical tasting room is operated by a winery or brewery located in a rural vineyard, where most of the production, bottling, marketing, and distribution takes place. It is usually separated from the main production facilities, either in a room by itself or a separate building, with a designated parking area and landscaped gardens or grounds, often with picnic areas for guests. They are typically open during abbreviated midday business hours, several days per week.

The primary feature of a tasting room is a tended walk-up bar counter where guests are offered small samples from a list of products produced by the winery or brewery, usually for a small fee. Wine is poured by staff that has been trained in knowledge of the products and production, who will answer questions and make conversation with guests. In smaller production facilities the owners, winemaker, brewmaster, or other executives may personally meet guests and pour the product. Larger operations often treat their tasting room as a sophisticated business unit with its own manager and dedicated staff, who usually work on a commission basis according to how much they sell. Some tasting rooms encourage guests to keep their glass; most apply the fee to product purchases. Tasting rooms usually pour their most popular products available at other retail locations (if any), but may also offer limited-release products that are for sale only on premises. They often withhold their most expensive products, except for guests who pay a premium fee or who seem likely to be good customers.

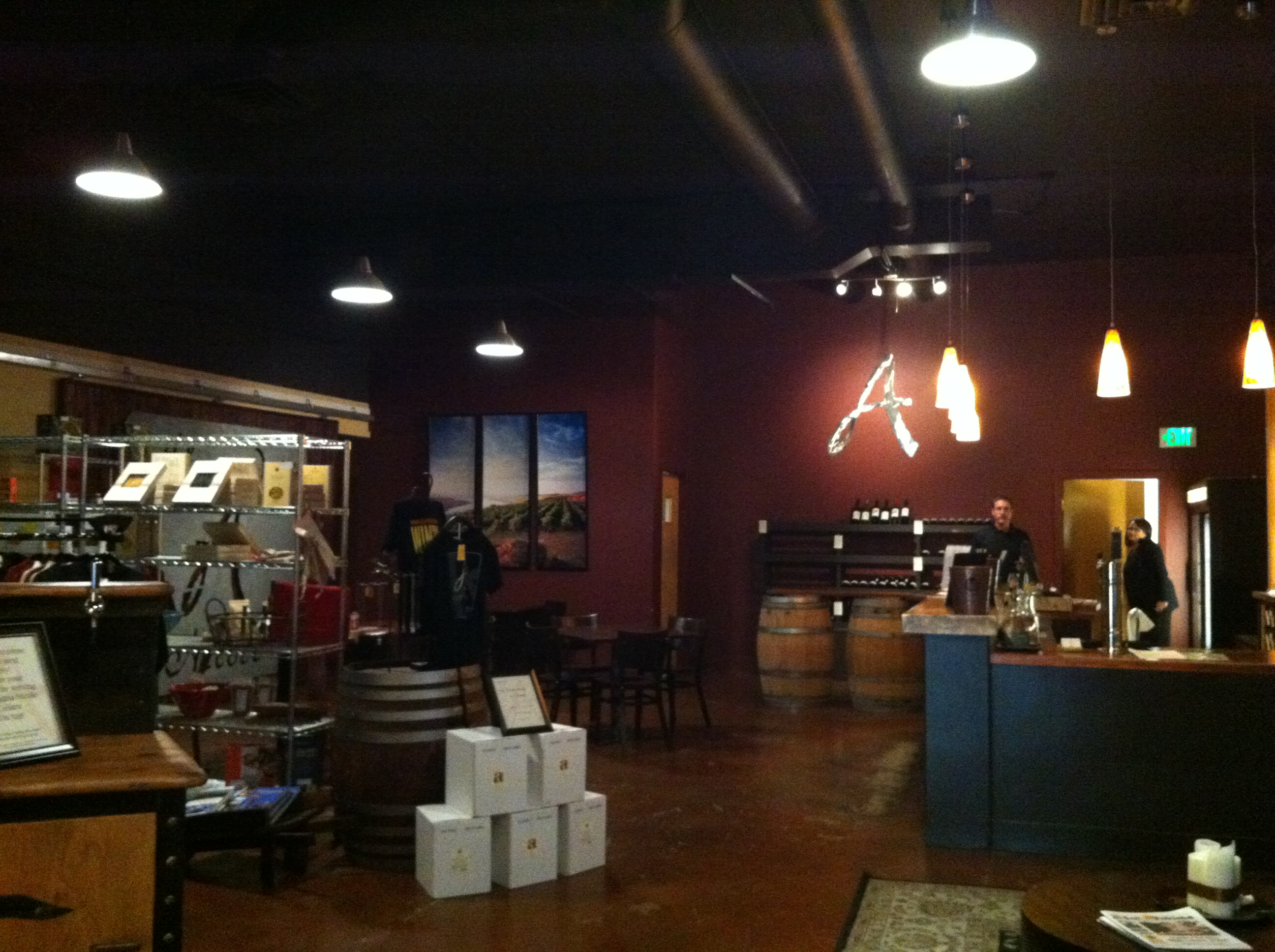
Many tasting rooms, such as the Alexandria Nicole Cellars tasting room in Prosser, Washington, will also include retail space with the tasting bar where consumers can buy accessories and merchandise with the company's logo.

Other common features are gifts, food items, and publications for sale. Some facilities offer tours as well. A few have restaurants or markets. Some offer tastings and tours by appointment only, for business or local zoning reasons.

Whereas tasting rooms were once an opportunity to taste or drink wine, economic efficiency and concerns over legal liability for drunk guests have encouraged most wineries to carefully limit the number and size of pours for each guest. Another legal issue is that wineries have been forced by aggressive litigators to comply with the ADA and other handicap issues. Most are now accessible to disabled guests, without steps, gravel walks, and other barriers.

Some wineries operate multiple tasting rooms in various cities. Others, particularly smaller wineries or those that are not easily accessible or permitted for visitors, join together in cooperative arrangements within a single tasting room, often in a nearby town. Some larger wineries have special "reserve" or VIP tasting rooms for handling large parties, industry representatives, and samples of more expensive or "library" wines. In other cases tasting rooms are operated as a commercial venture by an independent party that buys wines from the wineries, often as part of a wine store.

== Tasting room economics in the United States ==
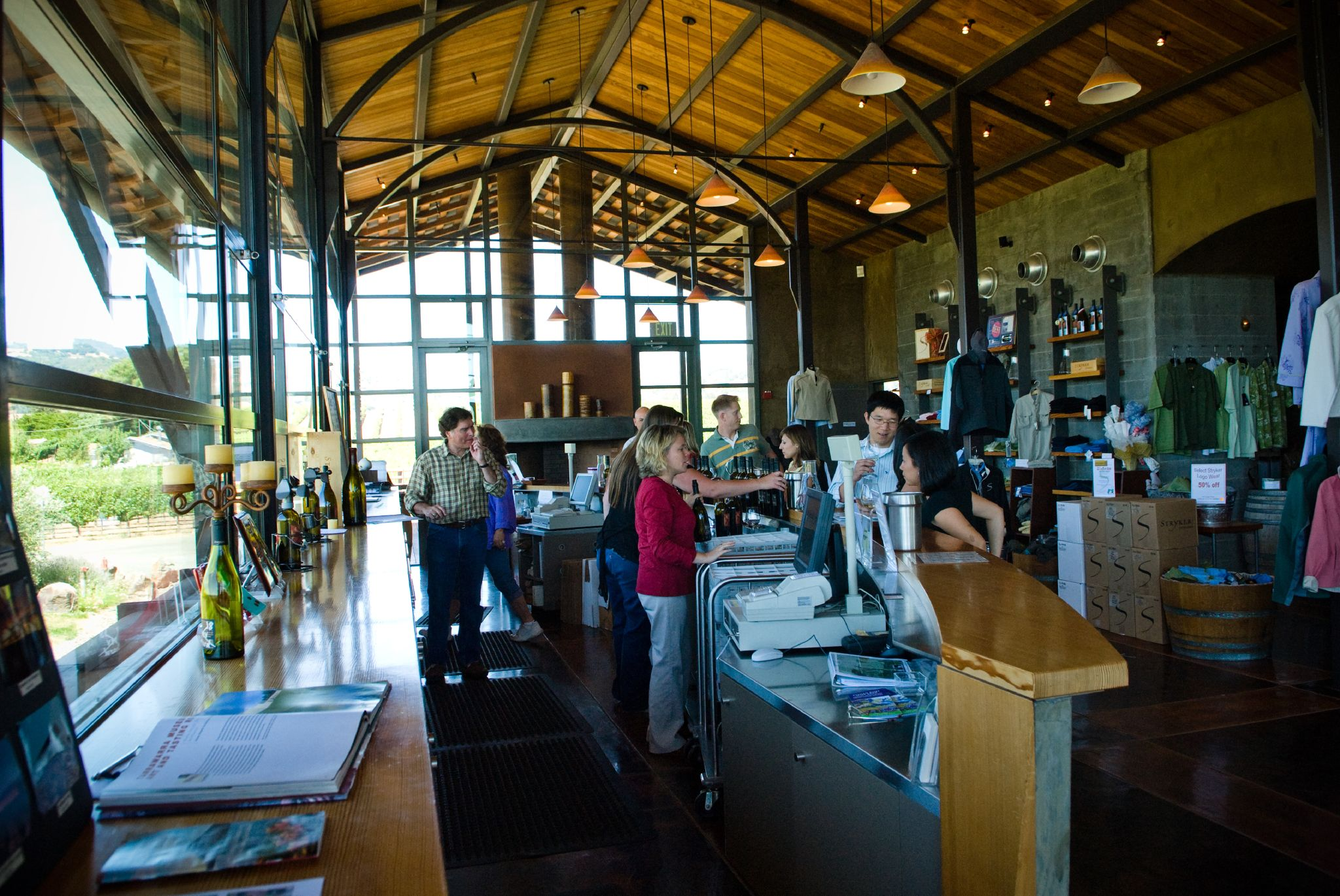
The Stryker Sonoma tasting room in the Alexander Valley AVA, California

Tasting rooms are still considered an important brand-building feature in the wine business. However, they have become increasingly important as outlets for direct-to-consumer sales, particularly for small wineries that do not have extensive distribution arrangements. By avoiding a middleman and selling high-priced bottles, tasting rooms achieve much greater profits per bottle than in their wholesale operations.

According to one industry survey 59 percent of American wineries charged a tasting fee in their tasting rooms for sampling wine (although many applied the fee toward a wine purchase, if any). Tasting rooms accounted for 43% of all winery sales in California, Washington, and Oregon, and 68% in other states.

== Straußwirtschaft ==
Straußwirtschaft is the tasting room and more for German wineries. These are owned and operated by smaller wineries. Often referred to as Strausse.
