= Paul Gregutt =

American wine writer

Paul Gregutt is an American wine writer whose focus is the wine of Oregon and Washington. Gregutt publishes a column titled "Wine Adviser" in The Seattle Times, and contributes to publications such as Vineyard & Winery Management, Yakima Herald-Republic, the Walla Walla Union-Bulletin and the Spokane Spokesman-Review. Gregutt is the Northwest Editor for Wine Enthusiast Magazine, and has written the Pacific Northwest material of Tom Stevenson's annual Wine Report, as well as contributions to Decanter and Wine Spectator.

Gregutt has published the book Washington Wines & Wineries: the Essential Guide (2007).

== See also ==
- List of wine personalities
