= Wine Enthusiast =

American wine magazine

- May 2023 cover
- Categories: Wine magazine
- Publisher: Wine Enthusiast Companies
- Founder: Adam Strum; Sybil Strum
- Founded: 1979
- Country: United States
- Based in: Valhalla, New York
- Language: English
- Website: www.wineenthusiast.com
- ISSN: 1078-3318

Wine Enthusiast Companies is a New York based company that engages in the wine, e-commerce, information, education, events, media, and travel markets. Wine Enthusiast Companies was founded in 1979 by Adam and Sybil Strum. It is composed of Wine Enthusiast Commerce and Wine Enthusiast Media.

Its magazine, Wine Enthusiast, was founded in 1988 and offers information on wine and spirits, with reviews and articles on topics peripheral to wine, entertainment, travel, restaurants, and notable sommeliers.

== History ==
After graduating from Rollins College, Adam Strum entered into the same profession as his father and became a wine salesman. The inspiration behind Wine Enthusiast Companies came from an instance when Strum and his wife, Sybil, looked for a corkscrew that was nowhere to be found; the Strums realized that wine accessories were not readily accessible.

In 1979, the direct-mail order catalog was launched. The Strums placed a small ad in a gourmet magazine for a corkscrew, realizing that the most affordable way to market customers was through direct mail. During its first year, over 100 orders were made through the direct-mail order catalog. In 1984, the company became the exclusive distributor of EuroCave wine storage products from France.

In 1988, the Wine Enthusiast magazine was launched. Wine Enthusiast serves as a guide to wine trends, ratings & reviews, food & travel, and award-winning commentary.

In 2000, The Wine Star Awards launched. Each year, Wine Enthusiast nominates and awards members of the wine, spirits and beverage industry across several different categories.

The company's first podcast "The Wine Enthusiast Podcast", was launched in 2016. In 2023, the company’s podcast “Vinfamous: Wine Crimes and Scandals” launched.

In June 2021, Wine Enthusiast Companies named the new presidents of the company, Erika and Jacqueline Strum. Erika Strum serves as President of Wine Enthusiast Commerce and Jacqueline Strum serves as President & Publisher of Wine Enthusiast Media.

In 2022, the company announced the development of the Wine Enthusiast Showroom, Education, and Tasting Center in its New York corporate office. The same year, Wine Enthusiast earned a Great Place to Work certification, with an 87% approval rating.

In March 2023, the company announced the relaunch of Wine Enthusiast Importer Connection, a program for wine producers to present their wines to importers. Wines that meet the program criteria are blind-tasted and rated on a 100-point scale.

In June 2023, Wine Enthusiast won a Brand Experience Award by Retail Touchpoints in "The Convergence of Content and Commerce" category, which recognizes brands that use content to effectively inform consumers who have 24/7 access to various and countless online resources.

== Operations ==
=== Commerce ===
Wine Enthusiast Commerce is the company’s print catalog and online commerce site for wine storage products and accessories, offering custom products for consumers globally via the site, direct mail, and a business-to-business division. In 2015, its first mobile site was launched, including streamlined navigation and new e-commerce integrations.

Wine Enthusiast offers phone consultations to help customers shop. Wine Enthusiast sells a wide range of free-standing wine cellars and offers a wine-cellar-design service that advises customers.

=== Magazine ===
Strum officially launched his user-friendly Wine Enthusiast magazine in 1988. The magazine is published by Wine Enthusiast Companies and offers information on wine and spirits, with reviews and articles on topics peripheral to wine, entertainment, travel, restaurants, and notable sommeliers. The print magazine is published 9 times a year. The magazine's website hosts a database of wine, beer, and spirits reviews, interviews, food and wine pairings, and industry news. By the end of 2015, the site was featuring a library of over 200,000 wine, beer, and spirits reviews as well as contributions by celebrities.

=== Top 100 Wine & Wine Star Awards ===
In addition to print and online publication, Wine Enthusiast hosts events for consumers and trade. Two main annual events are the Forward 50 list celebrates the top 50 wine restaurants in the United States featured yearly in the August Issue, and the annual Wine Star Awards dinner, during which awards are given to recipients in several different industry categories. Throughout the year, Wine Enthusiast magazine publishes "Best Of" lists. They include the Top 100 List, Future 40, Forward 50, Best Wine Shops, and Best Beer Shops.

== See also ==
- List of food and drink magazines
