= Eastside Rail Corridor =

Rail trail in Washington state

Eastrail
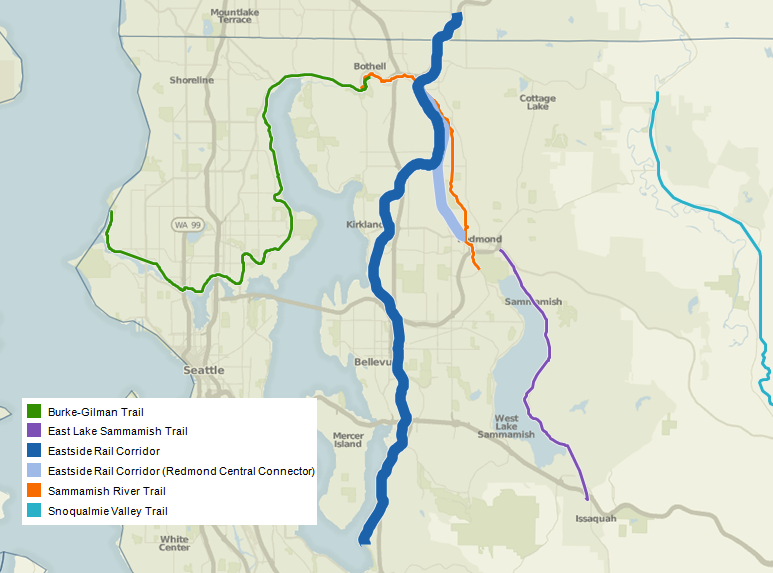
- Eastside Rail Corridor route
- Length: 15.6 mi (25.1 km)
- Location: Eastside King County Snohomish County, Washington, US
- Trailheads: Renton (southern terminus); City of Snohomish near Snohomish Junction (northern terminus)
- Use: Hiking/Biking, Freight Railroad
- Highest point: 200 ft (61 m), Kirkland near Peter Kirk Elem.
- Lowest point: 20 ft (6.1 m), Lake Washington shoreline
- Right of way: Northern Pacific's "Belt Line" and Burlington Northern's Woodinville Subdivision
- Website: https://eastrail.org/

The Eastside Rail Corridor, officially Eastrail, is a rail right of way where a rail trail has been under development in the Eastside suburbs of Seattle, Washington. The corridor follows the path of the former Woodinville Subdivision from Renton to the City of Snohomish at Snohomish Junction.

== History ==
=== Acquisition ===
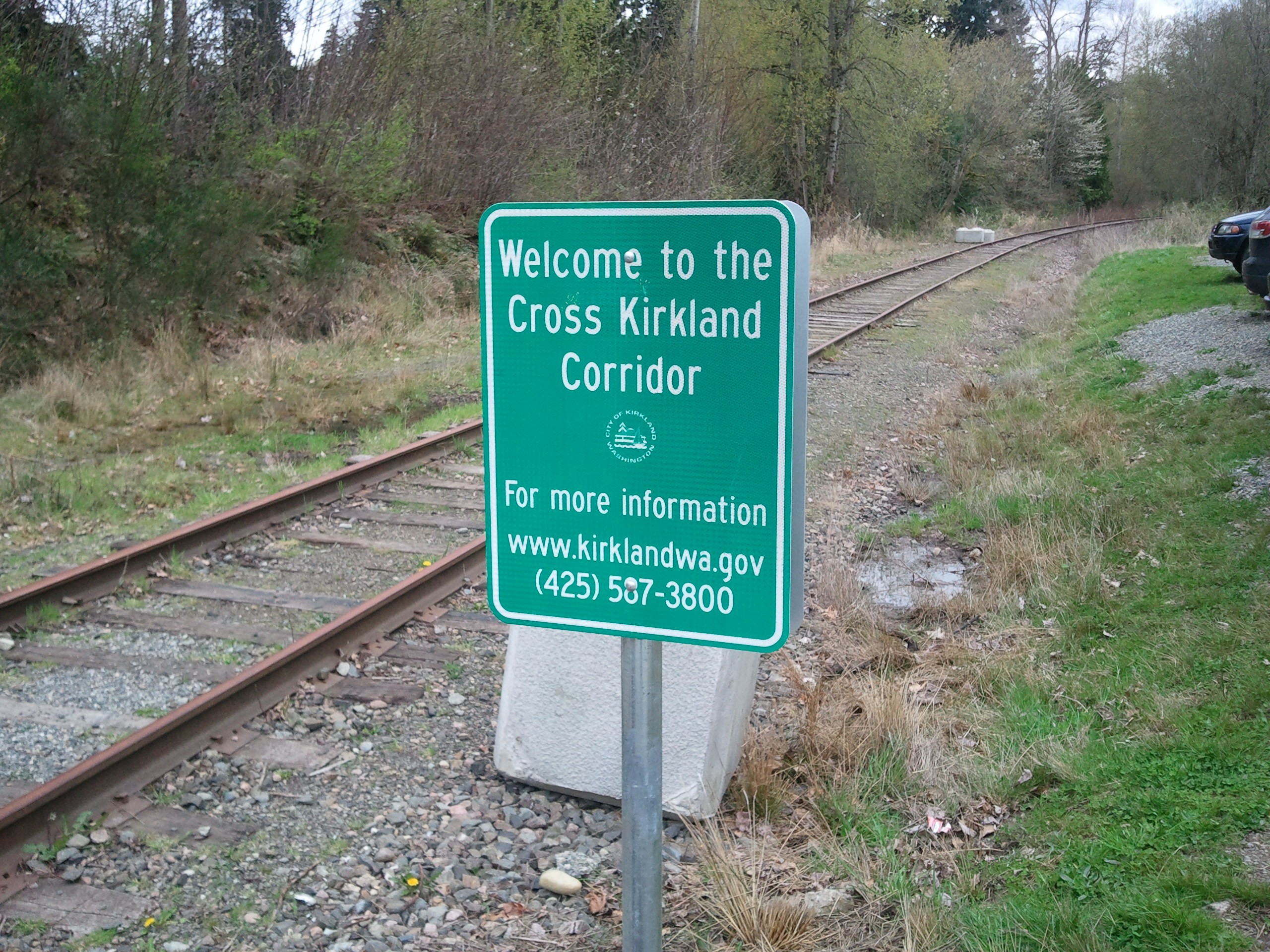
Cross Kirkland Corridor in 2013, prior to removal of rails and resurfacing

In the 2000s, Sound Transit studied plans to reactivate the Woodinville Subdivision for regular commuter rail service between Snohomish and Renton, but ultimately did not include it in any funding or expansion packages.

The Port of Seattle acquired the right of way of the former Woodinville Subdivision from BNSF Railway through purchase and donation in 2008. On December 10, 2012, the King County Council approved purchase of 15.6 miles (25.1 km) of the right-of-way from Port of Seattle. A portion of the central corridor, named the Cross Kirkland Corridor, is owned by the City of Kirkland; a spur to Redmond, named the Redmond Central Connector, is owned by the City of Redmond; a portion in downtown Bellevue was purchased by Sound Transit, and a northern portion of the corridor remains Port property for dual use as a trail and freight line. Some state residents brought suit against the Port of Seattle because the purchase was not used for freight in its entirety. In 2016, Snohomish County acquired the right of way from the King–Snohomish County line at Woodinville north to the city of Snohomish.

=== Opening ===
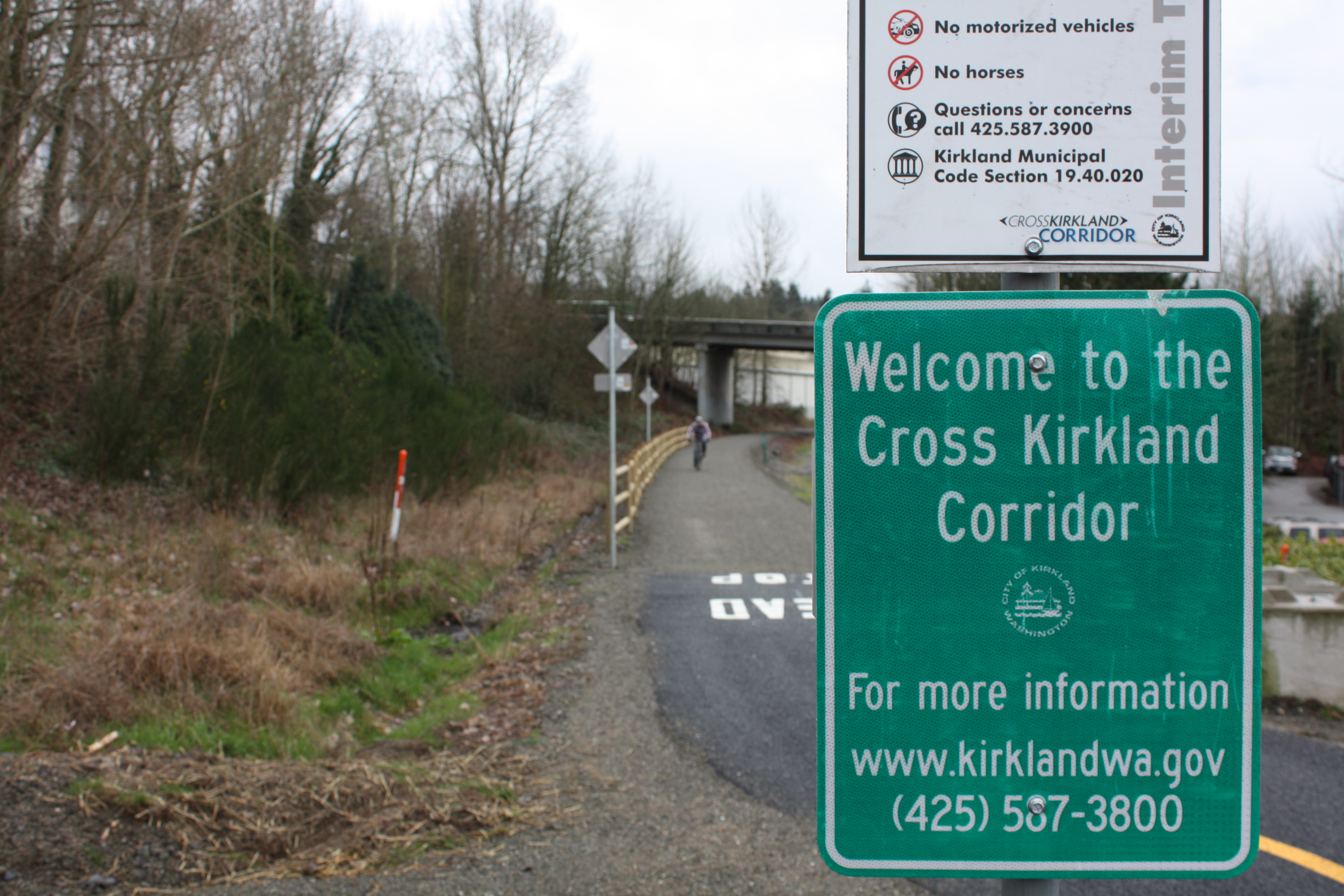
Cross Kirkland Corridor after official opening in 2015

In January, 2015, the 5.75-mile (9.25 km) Kirkland portion of the Eastside Rail Corridor, with compacted gravel surfacing, opened for pedestrians and bicyclists.

The Kirkland–Bellevue section was opened in July 2018, connecting State Route 520 (and its bike trail) to the Spring District. It was christened as Eastrail on July 20, 2019.

=== Eastside Greenway Alliance ===
In January 2016, community leaders gathered in Bellevue, Washington, for a one day summit about transforming the 28 miles (45 km) Eastside Rail Corridor into a multi-use trail. Prior to the meeting, planning and construction of various corridor segments had been underway for years.

The group envisioned a partnership of established and reputable regional and national nonprofits to collectively advocate for the trail. The Alliance would initially be co-led by Cascade Bicycle Club and The Trust for Public Land.

== Cities and connections ==
Cities through which the corridor passes include:

- Renton
- Newcastle
- Bellevue
- Kirkland (Cross Kirkland Corridor)
- Redmond (Redmond Central Connector)
- Woodinville
- Snohomish

=== Trail connections ===
If constructed as proposed by King County, these other trails would or could link to the Eastside Rail Corridor:

- Burke-Gilman Trail / Sammamish River Trail
- East Lake Sammamish Trail
- Cedar River Trail
- Soos Creek Trail
- Snoqualmie Valley Trail
- Green River Trail
- Interurban Trail
- Snohomish County Centennial Trail
- Lake-to-Lake Trail (Bellevue)
- Lake-to-Sound Trail (Renton to Des Moines)
- Mountains to Sound Greenway Trail (I-90)
- State Route 520 Trail
- Tolt Pipeline Trail
- Bear Creek Trail (Redmond)

== Railroad ownership ==
BNSF sold the running rights to Tom Payne, GNP Railway, between Woodinville and Snohomish in conjunction with the sale to the Port of Seattle. GNP's partner, Ballard Terminal Railroad, took over freight operations from BNSF Railway in January 2010. By 2011 Ballard Terminal Railroad was filing with other creditors in U.S. Bankruptcy Court for an involuntary reorganization of GNP.

A short line terminal railroad operating in Seattle, the Ballard Terminal Railroad, filed suit in the US District Court for the Western District of Washington and petitioned the Surface Transportation Board on April 1, 2013, seeking to prevent the City of Kirkland from removing the rail tracks for the planned trail. The Ballard Terminal Railroad wanted to keep the tracks intact for future rail freight use. On May 3, 2013, Federal District Court Judge Marsha Pechman granted the City of Kirkland's motion to dismiss the case filed by Ballard Terminal Railroad Company seeking to prevent rail salvage on the Cross Kirkland Corridor. In her oral ruling, Judge Pechman stated the Federal District Court did not have jurisdiction to consider Ballard's temporary restraining order (TRO) and that the Surface Transportation Board was the proper forum for adjudicating Ballard's claims. On August 1, 2013, the Surface Transportation Board denied the request by Ballard Terminal Railroad Company to block rail removal along the Cross Kirkland Corridor.
