= Seattle, Lake Shore and Eastern Railway =

Defunct railway in Washington state, U.S.

- The Seattle, Lake Shore and Eastern Railway; the Davenport–Spokane line is not shown

Overview
- Headquarters: Seattle, Washington
- Locale: Washington
- Dates of operation: 1885–1896
- Successors: Spokane and Seattle Railway; Seattle and International Railway

Technical
- Track gauge: 1,435 mm (4 ft 8 1/2 in)

The Seattle, Lake Shore and Eastern Railway (SLS&E) was a railroad founded in Seattle, Washington, on April 28, 1885, with three tiers of purposes: Build and run the initial line to the town of Ballard, bring immediate results and returns to investors; exploit resources east in the valleys, foothills, Cascade Range, and Eastern Washington in 19th-century style, attracting more venture capital; and boost a link to a transcontinental railroad for Seattle, the ultimate prize for incorporation. The historical accomplishment of the line was Seattle to Sumas at the border, with British Columbia, Canada, connecting with the Canadian Pacific transcontinental at the border at Huntingdon, British Columbia, now part of the City of Abbotsford.

In addition to the historical accomplishment, the SLS&E built and ran branches from Seattle through Bothell, on to Woodinville, to Sallal Prairie (just past North Bend); Salmon Bay (the industrial district of interbay); and Spokane to Davenport. Toward the latter end, one goal was creating a rail connection to North Dakota via Wallula, an outpost on the Columbia River in the early decades of railroad booms, near the present Tri-Cities. Local historian William Speidel reported that Henry Villard, tycoon of the Northern Pacific Railway (NP), had the federal rights and had the line through Wallula built. The SLS&E was first incorporated to build a line from the Seattle harbor in old Downtown, along Elliott Bay to the lumber and fishing town of Ballard.

Subsequent to its abandonment in 1971, a southern portion of the railroad’s right-of-way re-opened in 1978 as the Burke-Gilman Trail.

== Promoting a railroad empire involving Seattle ==
"Seattle, Lake Shore and Eastern Railway's Engine No. 2, the D.H. Gilman, photographed on Independence Day, 1895", "despite the rain", at Columbia Street Station on Railroad Avenue built on pilings over filled mudflat, now Western Avenue. The occasion had a holiday excursion to Sumas. The quote is from the foreground of the image.

The new Seattle, Lake Shore and Eastern Railway station at Snoqualmie, c 1890s.

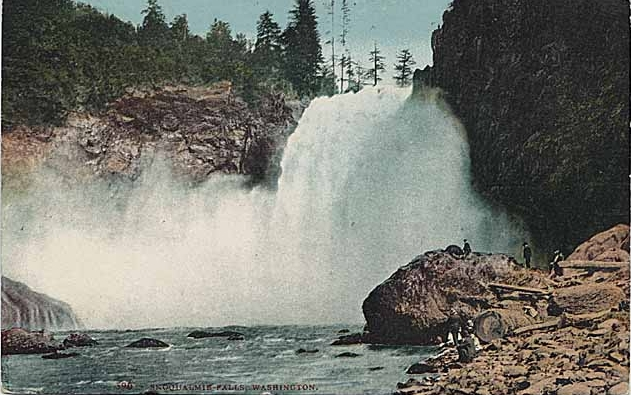
Snoqualmie Falls, near the end of the line. The SLS&E road was built passing near the south shore not far downstream and construction ended in 1889. Note size of figures and scale of flow; compare with contemporary. The Falls became a popular excursion destination from 4 July 1889. (Copyright expired.)

Railroading in Seattle closely paralleled development and early hopes for the future. Like communications networks today, 19th century railroading represented more than track, stock, and trade. Romantic and practical potential wooed communities across the West, much as Web commerce and bandwidth today (bandwidth was narrow, desire high, competition passionate). Travel between America's coasts had taken months, whether overland by wagon or by sailing ship or steamer around Cape Horn, until the transcontinental railroad, consisting of the Central Pacific and the Union Pacific reached San Francisco in 1869 and the Northern Pacific opened to Tacoma in 1887.

The SLS&E was conceived and financed by Seattle business interests in response to Villard of the NP selecting Seattle's intense rival Tacoma as its transcontinental western terminus, and incorporated on 15 April 1885. The original scheme for the SLS&E was connecting with an intercontinental railroad somewhere, while actually building north and east from Seattle. By the late 1880s, the SLS&E needed more capital for ongoing construction toward Sumas and an extension toward Spokane. The Seattle & Eastern Construction Company was formed with many of the same investors as the SLS&E. Construction of the eastern line began in Spokane. By the end of 1889, construction ended, having only reached Sallal Prairie, some miles past North Bend and 63 miles (101 km) from the Seattle station on Western Avenue at Columbia Street. In 1890, the plans were amended to focus on connecting Seattle to the Canadian Pacific Railway at Sumas on the border.

Local historian William Speidel (1967) observed that,

At best, insider boosters had hoped they might get as far as Denny's Iron Mountain in Snoqualmie Pass. While the SLS&E was designed to connect with one of the other transcontinentals, its primary purpose lay in 19th-century industrial development exploiting the city's hinterland: the fast-disappearing easy timber, then primarily coal and iron. A theory, which later became profitable in fact, was that commuter trains could run along the SLS&E track, and be only twenty scenic minutes away from the center of the city. Ever since, every suburb around the perimeter of the city has been advertised as only "twenty scenic minutes away from downtown."

The Seattle, Lake Shore and Eastern Railroad was a pretty weak reed for Seattle to cling to. City boosters blew a lot of money on that railroad and when they were through, it had only been built as far east as Rattlesnake Prairie above Snoqualmie Falls and as for north as Arlington. But it was the only hope that Seattle-New York Alki held out for a connection with a transcontinental system. On the other hand, the side benefits of the SLS&E enabled boosters to hit the jackpot with the Great Northern.

The verso of a promotional print celebrating an opening excursion of the SLS&E stated,

The Seattle Lake Shore and Eastern Railroad company was organized April 15, 1885 and was financed by local men and Jamieson, Smith and Cotting of New York. The first division of the road was to Issaquah where the coal mines would furnish cargoes. The first depot of the road was built at the foot of Columbia Street, but as space for trackage and terminals was too limited, the city created Railroad Avenue, 120 feet wide. The city gave the new road thirty feet of the Avenue for trackage and offered the Northern Pacific an equal amount which was not accepted. Construction was soon started from the eastern end of Spokane and forty miles of road built. Startled by the success of this competing line, the Northern Pacific purchased control and abandoned its fight against Seattle in 1890. [The quote is text on the verso of a silver gelation print, "Excursion on the Seattle Lake Shore and Eastern Railroad, n.d.", A. Curtis 59932.]

The SLS&E accomplished 126.30 miles (203.26 km) Seattle to Sumas at the Canada–US border, connecting with the Canadian Pacific transcontinental, late 1880s-1892; with branches of approximately 24.5 miles (39.4 km) from Seattle through Bothell, 38.45 miles (61.88 km) Woodinville Junction to Sallal Prairie (North Bend) (about 63 miles (101 km) downtown Seattle to the prairie), 1886–1889; 5–6 miles (8.0–9.7 km) from downtown to Salmon Bay and spur to the town of Ballard, 1885; a Winsor branch (through Bothell and up North Creek); and 50.05 miles (80.55 km) Spokane to Davenport, in 1888–1889.

"[A]ll along the line the road's construction caused a tremendous stir ... logging camps, mills, mines, and towns sprang into existence as if by magic." The SLS&E boosted not only the town of Ballard (connected 1886), but new towns like Ross, Fremont, Latona (in what is now east Wallingford), Brooklyn (in what is now west University District), Yesler (now part of Laurelhurst), Bothell (Thanksgiving, 1887) and towns out to Gilman (now Issaquah).

The verso of a print in UW archives noted,

August 20, 1894. Wreck on [the] Seattle, Lake Shore and Eastern just west of Latone [now Latona Avenue]. Freight train from Gilman [now Issaquah] hit a cow. [Trainload was a] [m]ixer freight train, 10 co[a]l cars, logs and box cars. Train had slowed down at Brooklyn [Avenue] for cows. Engineer saw cows on a bank beyond Latona looking (?) one another[!]. One cow was tossed over [the] bank and hit the track just as [the] engine came by. [The] [e]ngine was raised off the track[,] and when it came down [the] wheels went off the rails. Engineer reversed but [it] was too late. [The] [c]oal tender shot ahead[,] tearing part of car [(the engine cab)] off and decapitating [the] fireman and killing [the] brakeman. Engineer and coal passer [were] unhurt. Steam and dust enveloped the derailed cars. Engineer ran to Fremont to telegraph to stop [the] evening passenger train[;] also [illegible] Engineer claimed train going 20 miles per hr.

The streets at that time were rural, more tracks or plat lines than avenues. The run to Fremont Station was more than a mile (about 1.6 km). A small freight depot remains today at the foot of Stone Way N.

== Bankruptcy ==
The company entered receivership on July 1, 1893, and continued to operate. The company was sold on May 16, 1896, and the assets split between two companies. The Spokane and Seattle Railway acquired the eastern line between Spokane and Davenport, while the Seattle and International Railway acquired the western lines around Seattle.

== Building the SLS&E in Eastern Washington ==
The SLS&E was planned to be a larger railroad than it ultimately became. Construction was in two parts, with the eastern Washington section started in Spokane and headed west, begun in the late 1880s by largely the same group of investors incorporating the Seattle & Eastern Construction Company.

An old map shows the proposed line going from Davenport to Coulee City, up the Grand Coulee to Waterville, then on to Wenatchee, then along the Wenatchee River, and up over part of Stevens Pass then over toward Everett. With what is known today about Cascade Range topography that was little-known or unknown back then, how much was promotion and how much was actually expected according to the insiders' business plan remains part of the intrigue of railroad history.

The steam locomotive "A. M. Cannon." SLS&E number 11, was named after a prominent Spokane resident. Cannon was very instrumental in the building of the SLS&E in the Spokane area.

It has been reported that the Great Northern (GN) used the SLS&E bridge over the Spokane River while the GN was building its own during its transcontinental construction in 1893.

The eastern Washington line became the Spokane & Seattle Railway, which was purchased by the NP in two parts. The first—Medical Lake to Davenport—was purchased in 1899. The remainder, between Medical Lake and Spokane, was bought in 1900.

== Recent history ==
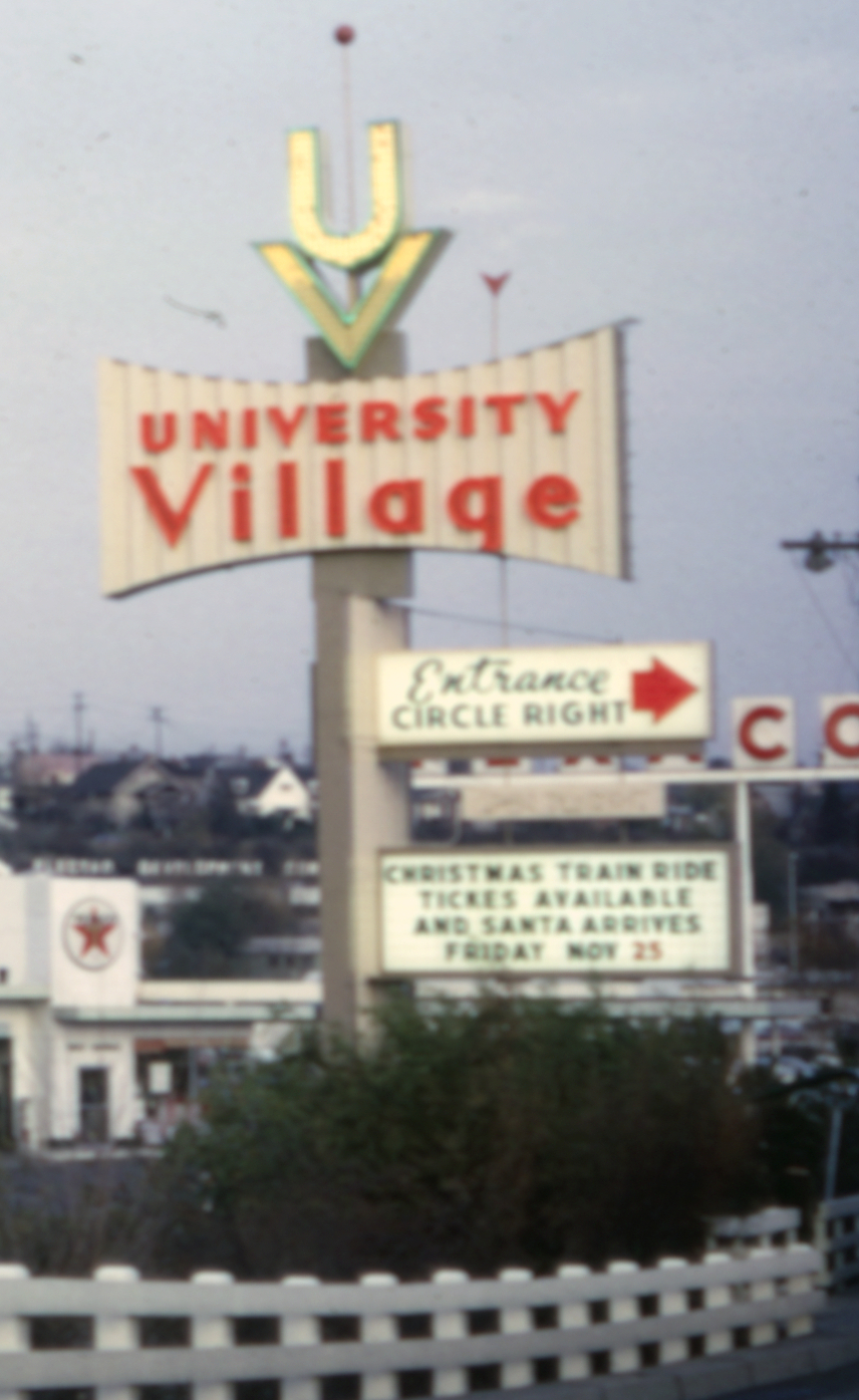
Seattle's University Village shopping center advertises "Christmas Train Ride", December 1966

The western Washington lines remained in fairly heavy use until 1963. In the Christmas season, from 1956 until at roughly 1965, Seattle's University Village Shopping Center (which opened in 1956) ran "Santa Trains" as a promotional event. This recreational train ride, mainly for children, ran from University Village at least to Kenmore, Washington at the north end of Lake Washington, and in some years as far as Woodinville. On March 3, 1970, the lines merged into Burlington Northern Railway which started to file to abandon some of the sections a year later in 1971. Seven years later, in 1978, the 12.1 miles (19.5 km) between Gas Works Park in Seattle and Tracy Owen Station in Kenmore was reopened as the Burke-Gilman Trail bike path and recreational rail trail, named after the leaders of the group that founded the railroad, Thomas Burke and Daniel Gilman. The bike path and rail trail has been extended along the SLS&E line west through Interbay, and extending east from Jerry Wilmot Park, South Woodinville, the King County Regional Trail system leads to the cross-state Palouse to Cascades State Park Trail. A 5.5-mile (8.9 km) section of the railway, between Snoqualmie Falls and North Bend, was preserved in 1975, and is now owned and operated by the Northwest Railway Museum.

In eastern Washington, the Northern Pacific abandoned the section between Spokane and Medical Lake right after purchase, preferring to use their own branch from Spokane, the Central Washington Branch (CW Branch). The section from Medical Lake to Davenport was operated for a time before the line was trimmed back to include only an 18-mile (29 km) spur out of Davenport to Eleanor. The Washington Water Power Company purchased the right-of-way between Spokane and Medical Lake from the Northern Pacific on or about 2 March 1904, for use as an interurban passenger railway. It remained in use as an interurban until early 1922, before the rails were torn up again. The only remaining eastern Washington section by 1970 was the spur out of Davenport that ran to Eleanor, abandoned in 1983. As of May 2019 the only remaining section is the Wye going south of Davenport; it is now used to turn locomotives around and storage for the Washington Eastern Railroad.

The right-of-way has long since reverted to adjacent landowners and has been used for other purposes, having been abandoned 1922–1983. If these lines had been operated in a more urban setting, and in more recent times, they might have been converted to use today as a trail. But at the time this line was abandoned, the rails to trails movement had not begun. By today much of the lines in the open country of Eastern Washington have gone the way of the "disappearing railroad blues." Some sections can still be seen, but otherwise much of it has become roadways or disappeared into history.

== See also ==
- Burke-Gilman Trail
- Iron Horse State Park
- Dr. Thomas T. Minor
- Eastside Rail Corridor
- Woodinville Subdivision
- Snohomish County Centennial Trail
- Eastlake Sammamish Trail
- Redmond Central Connector
- Seattle Waterfront Streetcar

== Bibliography ==
- "Collection". Northwest Railway Museum. January 2005.
- Armbruster, Kurt E. (1999). Orphan Road: the Railroad Comes to Seattle, 1853-1911. Pullman, Washington: Washington State University Press. ISBN 978-0-87422-185-5.
- Curtis, Asahel (n.d.). "Excursion on the Seattle Lake Shore and Eastern Railroad, n.d." Asahel Curtis Photo Company Collection. University of Washington Libraries. Special Collections Division.
- Curtis, Asahel (c. 1887). "Opening of Seattle, Lake Shore & Eastern Railway, Seattle, ca. 1887". Lantern Slide Collection. Museum of History & Industry, Seattle; All Rights Reserved.
- Dorpat, Paul (1994) [1984]. "42". Seattle, now & then (Second ed.). Seattle: Tartu Publications. ISBN 0-961435-70-4. ISBN 0-961435-71-2 (pbk.).
  2d edition of vol. I of III
- Evans, Elwood (1889). History of the Pacific Northwest; Oregon and Washington; embracing an account of the original discoveries on the Pacific coast of North America, and a description of the conquest, settlement and subjugation of the ... original territory of Oregon; also interesting biographies of the earliest settlers and more prominent men and women of the Pacific Northwest, including a ... description of the climate, soil, productions ... of Oregon and Washington ... Portland, Oregon: North Pacific History Company of Portland, Oregon.
- Goodman, Steve (1970). "The City of New Orleans". Lyrics Connection. Arlo.net.
  Downin, Dave, curator
- Interstate Commerce Commission (1929). "Interstate Commerce Commission Reports: Decisions of the Interstate Commerce Commission of the United States. Valuation reports". U.S. Government Printing Office.
- MacIntosh, Heather M.; Crowley, Walt (September 22, 1999). "Railroad Development in the Seattle/Puget Sound Region, 1872-1906". Cyberpedia Library: HistoryLink.org Essay 1683.
- MacIntosh, Heather (November 18, 1999). "Seattle, Lake Shore & Eastern Railroad Company". HistoryLink.org Essay 1736.
- Martin, Dale Jr. (April 25, 2006). "Issaquah Railway History Chronology". Issaquah Historical Society. Archived from the original on April 10, 2006.
- Mutschler, Charles V.; Parent, Clyde L.; Siegert, Wilmer H. (1987). Spokane's Street Railways, An Illustrated History. Spokane, Washington: Inland Empire Railway Historical Society.
- "PCC map". Palouse River & Coulee City Railroad (PCC). Watco Companies Railroads. n.d.
- Ramsay, Guy Reed (n.d.). Postmarked Washington Lincoln County. Lincoln County Historical Society. pp. n.p.
- Renz, Louis Tuck (1980). The History of the Northern Pacific Railroad. Fairfield, Washington: Ye Galleon Press.
  North Central Regional Library 385.0657 RENZ
- Robertson, Donald B. (1995). Encyclopedia of Western Railroad History. Vol. III. Caldwell, Idaho: Caxton Printers. ISBN 978-0-87004-366-6.
- Ruffner, W. H. (1889). A Report on Washington Territory. New York, Seattle, Lake Shore, and Eastern Railway.
  Seattle Public Library 979.7 R838R, R979.7 R838R
  Brooks Library, Central Washington University, Ellensburg; Book, Special Coll fourth Floor - "F891 R92", Microfiche third Floor - "MH-351".
- Seattle Post-Intelligencer newspaper, 1885–1896.
- "Snoqualmie Valley Trail". King County Regional Trail System. Department of Natural Resources and Parks, Parks and Recreation Division. September 19, 2005. Archived from the original on October 19, 2000.
- Speidel, William C. (1967). Sons of the profits; or, There's no business like grow business: the Seattle story, 1851-1901. Seattle: Nettle Creek Publishing Company. ISBN 0-914890-06-9.
- Photographer unknown (August 20, 1894). "Train wreck in University District, August 20, 1894". University of Washington Libraries. Special Collections Division.
