= Rosemarie Ives =

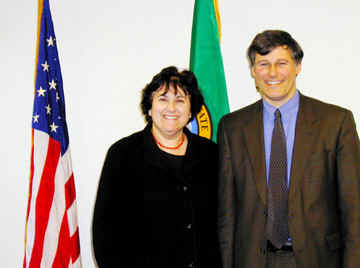
Ives with Jay Inslee in 2001

Rosemarie Ives is a former mayor of Redmond, Washington, having served from 1991 to 2007 and deciding to step down after what for Redmond was an unprecedented four terms in office.

== Biography ==
Ives was born Rosemarie Moccia to Italian immigrants to the United States. She is married to Jonathan Ives and has a son named Gregory. She earned a History degree and was a social studies teacher before moving to Redmond in 1980. She was appointed to the Planning Commission in 1983 by Mayor Christine Himes, then served on the City Council and won election as Mayor against incumbent Doreen Marchione in 1991.

Ives served Redmond during a period of economic growth as Redmond is home to company facilities for such companies as Microsoft, Aerojet, Nintendo, Cingular Wireless, Medtronic, Eddie Bauer, Genie Industries and Safeco Insurance. Much of her efforts went to preserving residential neighborhoods, open space and other quality of life elements, and her vision statement was "Together, We Create a Community of Good Neighbors."

She oversaw seven departments with some 500 employees and a biennial budget of $368 million. She received some criticism for the way in which the new Redmond City Hall was financed as well as the scope of the project. The new city hall has been estimated to cost Redmond taxpayers between $60–80 million and has significant unused space. Wright Runstad

Redmond City Hall is a “jewel box” sitting on the south edge of the city's campus. This four-story, 113,068 square foot building features a two-story lobby with 25-foot windows and a prominent staircase to the second floor lobby. A gas fireplace, slate flooring, walls of granite, limestone, copper and wood paneling, plus a well landscaped deck with dramatic views of the Sammamish River, invite occupants and guests to linger and enjoy the space.

In 2006 she convinced the Redmond City Council to support a Levy Lid Lift ballot measure to increase Redmond's property tax rate more than 50%. It was defeated in a special election. The city council approved a budget in late 2006 that maintained service levels by increasing some taxes and spending less on capital improvements. In 2007, a modest levy measure was passed in support of police and fire protection; the measure was opposed by Mayor Ives.

Her term ended December 31, 2007; she was succeeded by John Marchione, the son of the woman she defeated in her first mayoral race.

As Mayor, Ives was an active member of the U.S. Conference of Mayors, serving on its advisory board for two years, chairing the Taskforce on Sustainability and participating in committees on Urban Economic Policy, Homeland Security, E-Governance, Arts, Culture and Recreation, and Urban Water. She also served on the executive board of the Mayors Innovation Project, and participated in the historic Sundance Summits I and II on Global Warming, the Mayors Institute on City Design, and the 22nd Jerusalem Conference of Mayors.

Ives has been a speaker on many topics including the U.S. Conference of Mayors National Conference on Global Warming, and was an initial signatory of the Mayors Climate Protection Agreement. She was a jurist for the American Institute of Architects 2005 Award for Regional and Urban Design and the U.S. Conference of Mayors 2008 City Livability Awards. She served for three years on the National League of Cities Leadership Institute Council and is a lifetime member of the American Association of University Women.

In 2019, Ives began an annual Wind Beneath My Wings Scholarship to help high school seniors living in Redmond pay for college. The new city hall building in the suburb of Redmond, Washington, east of Seattle, resulted from a juried mini-competition among two established firms and a newer contender. The structure reflects the decision-making of Redmond's town leaders.

In 2022, Ives and others opposed a Redmond Public Safety Levy (Proposition No 1). They argued that: 1) the timing for new taxes is wrong given inflationary and recessionary times, coupled with property assessments that increased 45% in 2022; 2) surveys show residents feel safe; and 3) if public safety is underfunded it should be properly funded in the city budget, not with a new tax that would cost a median home owner an additional $525 with an annual 5% increase.

Preceded by Doreen Marchione	Mayor of Redmond; 1991–2007	Succeeded by John Marchione
