= PSE Trail =

Coordinates: 47°41′18″N 122°08′10″W

The PSE Trail, also called the Puget Power Trail and the Redmond Powerline Trail, is an unpaved equestrian, pedestrian and mountain bike trail in Redmond, Washington. It links the Redmond Central Connector and Sammamish River Trail to Farrel-McWhirter Park.

The trail begins at the Redmond Central Connector. It passes by the Overlake Christian Church, and then over the Sammamish River. After meeting the Sammamish River Trail, it climbs Education Hill and crosses Route 202. It then descends down the hill and eventually reaches Farrel-McWhirter Park. There is a short gap in the trail after the park. The trail then crosses through the Redmond Watershed Preserve, before ending in Redmond Ridge.

The route is within the easement of the 230 kV Sammamish-Juanita transmission line. The line was once leased by Puget Sound Energy, but is owned by the Bonneville Power Administration.
