= Redmond Derby Days =

- Type: Civic Festival
- Celebrations: Bicycle and footraces, carnival rides, kid's activities, drone show
- Date: Second weekend of July
- Frequency: Annual
- First time: 1939
- Related to: Redmond, Washington

Redmond Derby Days is an annual summer festival held in the city of Redmond, Washington.

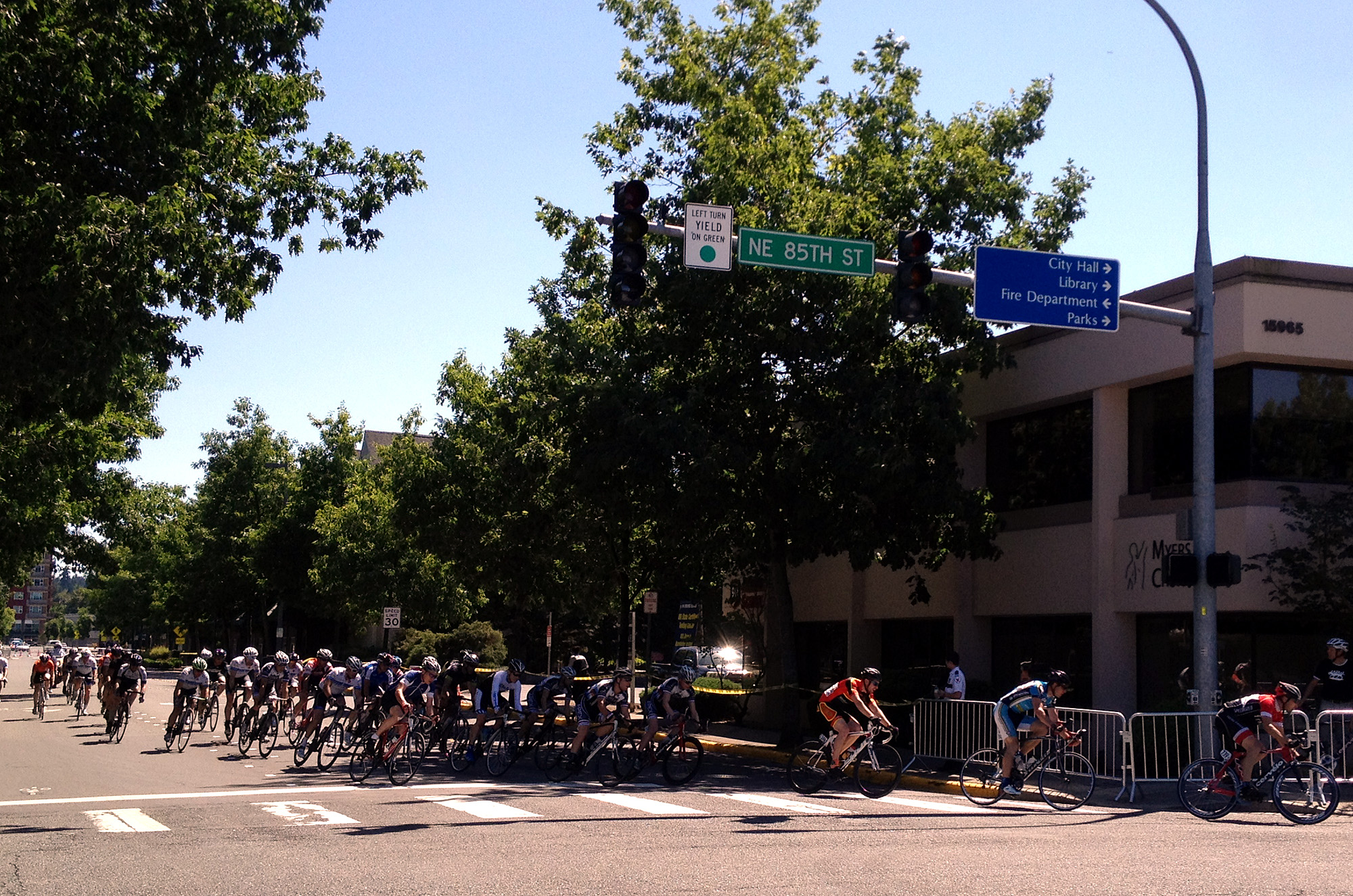
Bicyclists participating in a Redmond Derby Days bicycle race

Former Redmond mayor John Marchione states the festival celebrates the city's "small-town roots and innovative spirit." The festival features a Grand Parade, a pancake breakfast by the Redmond Fire Department, a 5K run, and the Criterium bike race.

== History ==
The event originated as the Redmond Bike Derby, held to raise money for Christmas decorations and athletic gear for schools. Inaugurated in 1939, the Derby Day races are the oldest continuous bike race in the United States. The original route was a circuit around Lake Sammamish. A contemporary report claims "everyone in general agreed that this festival should become an annual affair."

The Derby Days were not held from 1942 to 1945, due to World War II.

The 2020 Derby Days were initially cancelled due to the COVID-19 pandemic. The city later announced that the festival would be held online, in a "2020 Virtual Edition."
