= Innova Solutions =

American technology company

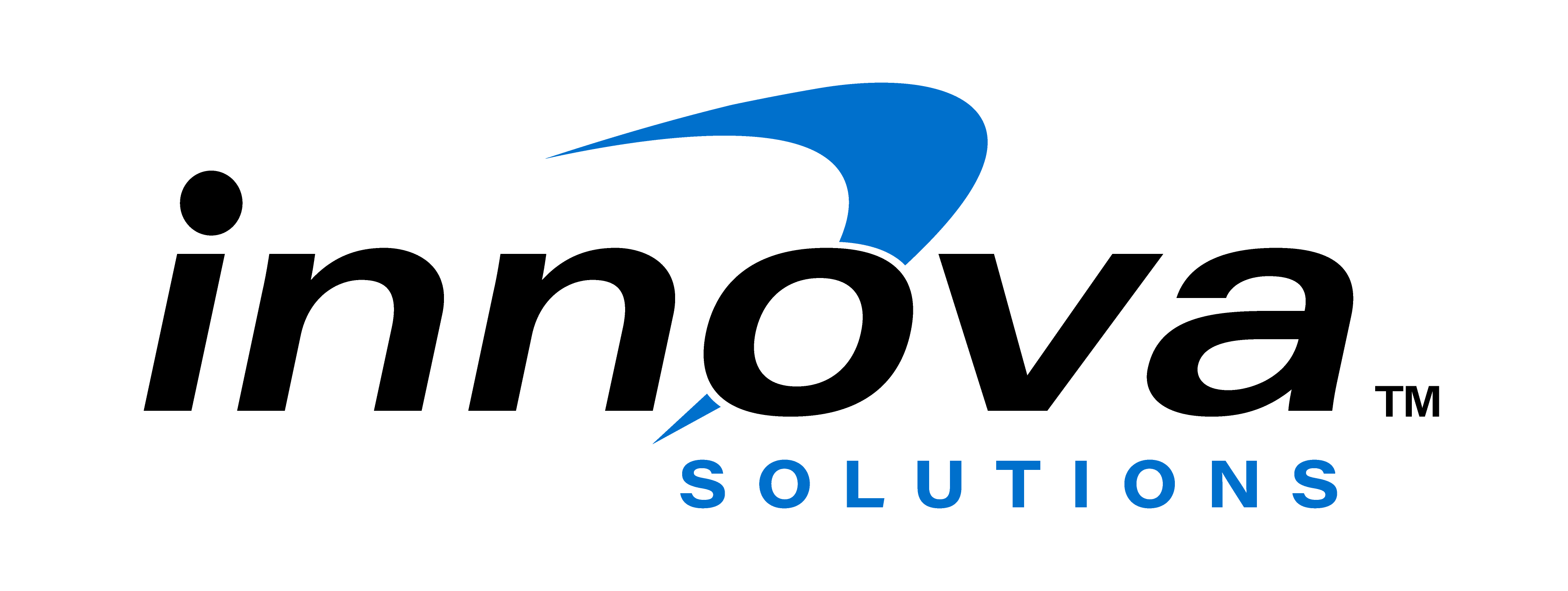

Innova Solutions, Inc. (Innova; formerly American CyberSystems, Inc. aka ACS Solutions) is an American technology and business transformation solutions provider headquartered in Atlanta, Georgia, which operates internationally.

The company reports an annual revenue approaching $3.5 billion and has approximately 50,000 employees worldwide.

In October 2023, the Atlanta Business Chronicle named Innova Solutions one of the Top 10 Private Companies in the city when measured by size and revenue.

== Notable Competitors ==
Everest Group's "Healthcare Data and Analytics Services PEAK Matrix® Assessment 2023" included Innova Solutions as a "Major Contender" alongside Wipro and Infosys."

In the "HFS Horizons Report: The Best Service Providers for Asset and Wealth Management, 2024," from HFS Research, Innova Solutions was labeled a "Disruptor" alongside other companies including Hitachi Digital Services and Tech Mahindra.

== Acquired Companies ==
=== Innova Solutions ===
In 2019, American CyberSystems, Inc. completed a merger with Innova Solutions, Inc. A press release regarding the acquisition states that its purpose was, “…to help accelerate the growth of ACS Group’s software development practices and emerging technology solutions and services.” In 2022, ACS announced an official transition under which the company, along with many of its subsidiaries, would begin to operate under the Innova Solutions brand.

=== Volt Information Sciences ===
Volt Information Sciences, Inc. is an international provider of staffing services, outsourcing solutions, and information technology infrastructure services. In April 2022, ACS completed its acquisition of Volt Information Sciences. At the time of the acquisition, Volt was ranked as the 26th largest staffing firm in the US, while ACS was ranked as the 19th largest.

In July 2023, Innova Solutions announced the integration of Volt International; after this integration, Volt International began doing business as Innova Solutions International. In addition to Innova Solutions International, Volt goes to market as Volt Workforce Solutions, Volt Asia, and Volt Consulting Group.

== Innova Foundation ==
Innova Solutions' founder and CEO, Raj Sardana, created the Innova Foundation (formerly the ACS Foundation) in 2013 to support non-profit organizations and charitable initiatives across the globe.

Along with his wife, Nita (Vice President of Community Outreach and Corporate Giving at Innova Solutions), Sardana has led partnerships with U.S.-based non-profit organizations—such as the YWCA's Teen Girls in Technology Program, Women in Technology (WIT), and the Atlanta Food Bank.

In India, Innova Solutions supports the Earth Saviors Foundation, an NGO-based in Delhi which works to promote social consciousness and environmentalism.
