= Sammamish River Trail =

Rail trail in King County, Washington

Coordinates: 47°45′9.73″N 122°12′34.74″W

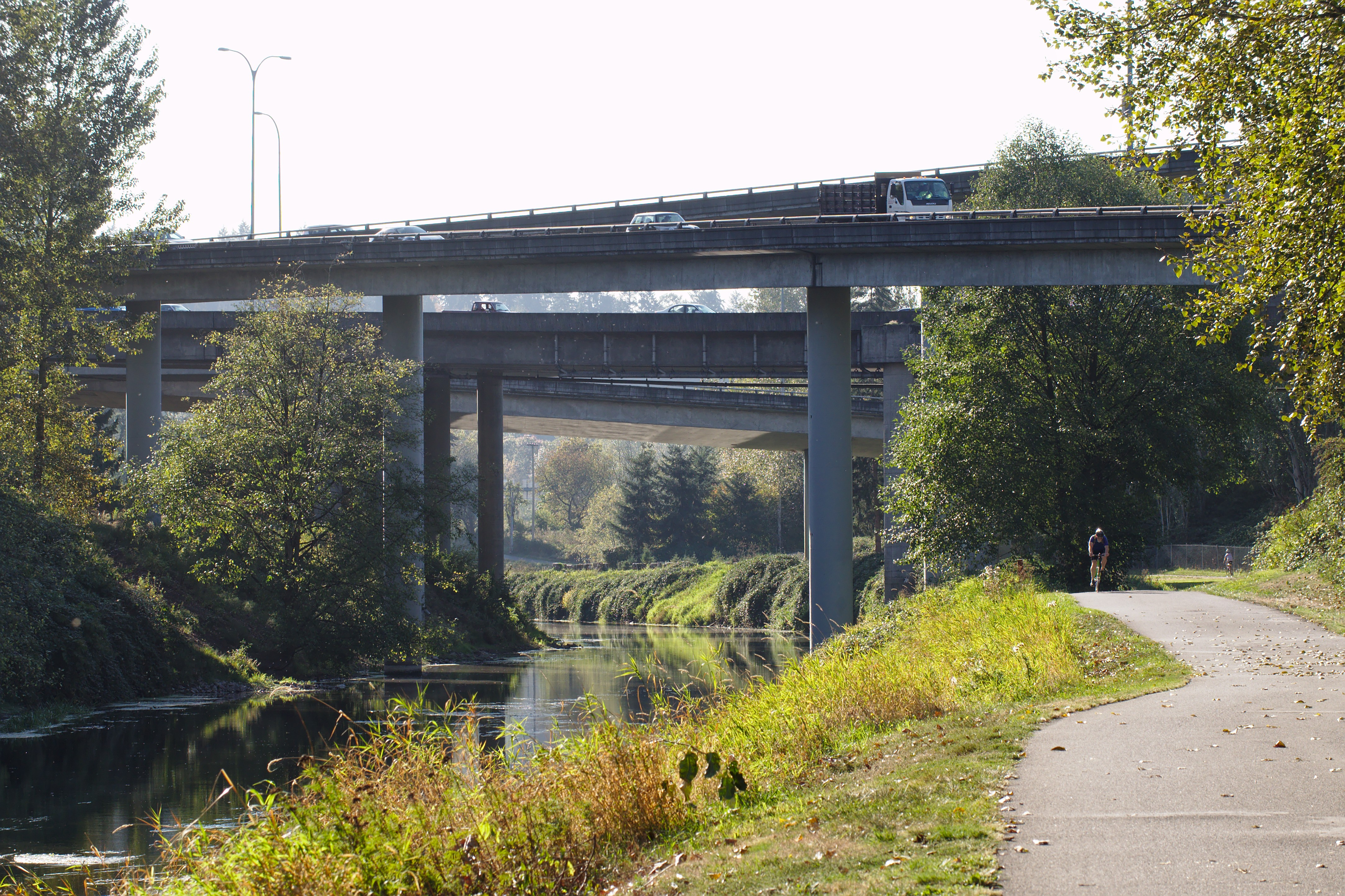
- Trail passing under Interstate 405
- Length: 10.1 miles (16.3 km)
- Location: King County, Washington
- Use: Pedestrian, bicycle, equestrian, and inline-skate
- Grade: 317 feet (97 m)
- Surface: Paved with parallel unpaved equestrian trail

Trail map
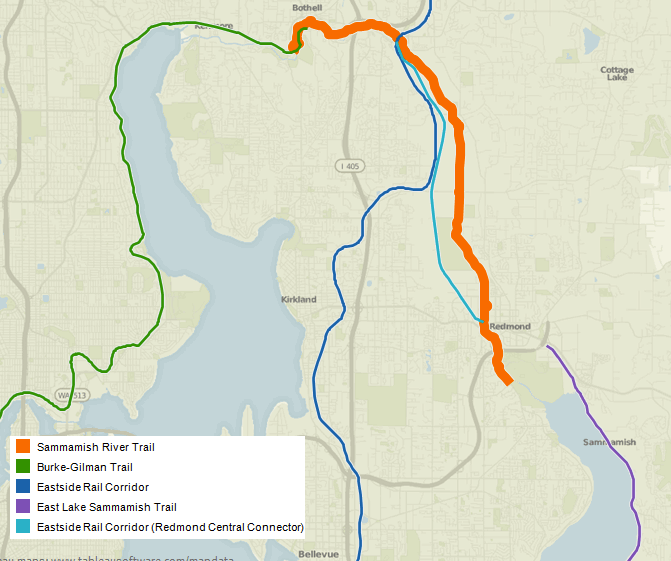
- Route of Sammamish River Trail (orange) and some connecting trails

The Sammamish River Trail is a 10.1-mile (16.3 km) recreational pedestrian and bike path rail trail in King County, Washington that runs along the Sammamish River from Blyth Park in Bothell to Marymoor Park in Redmond as part of the "Locks to Lakes Corridor." It connects to the Burke-Gilman Trail at its northwestern end and to the Redmond Central Connector at its southeastern end.

== Route ==
The trail is paved for bicycle, inline-skate, and pedestrian use and passes Sixty Acres Park. An equestrian trail runs parallel to the paved trail from Woodinville to Marymoor park. The trail has a 317 feet (97 m) grade.

=== Connecting trails ===
On the north side, the trail connects to the Burke-Gilman Trail.

In Redmond, the trail intersects with the Redmond Central Connector Trail and passes under it via the Sammamish River Trestle, an old railroad bridge that has been retrofitted. Along the trestle's handrails is an art installation of steel panels, with the words of a poem by Rebecca Meredith, former Redmond Poet Laureate as well as railroad and natural imagery of "Earth", "Air", and "Water" cut into the panels. From the Sammamish River Trail, pedestrians can ascend stairs to access the trestle. Pedestrians and cyclists can also go just east of the river and ascend a paved ramp to reach the intersecting Redmond Central Connector trail and cross the Sammamish River Trail and river via the trestle.

Other trails connecting with the Sammamish River Trail include the East Lake Sammamish Trail, Tolt Pipeline Trail, Puget Power trail, and the North Creek Trail.
