= Redmond, Washington =

City in Washington, United States

Redmond
- City
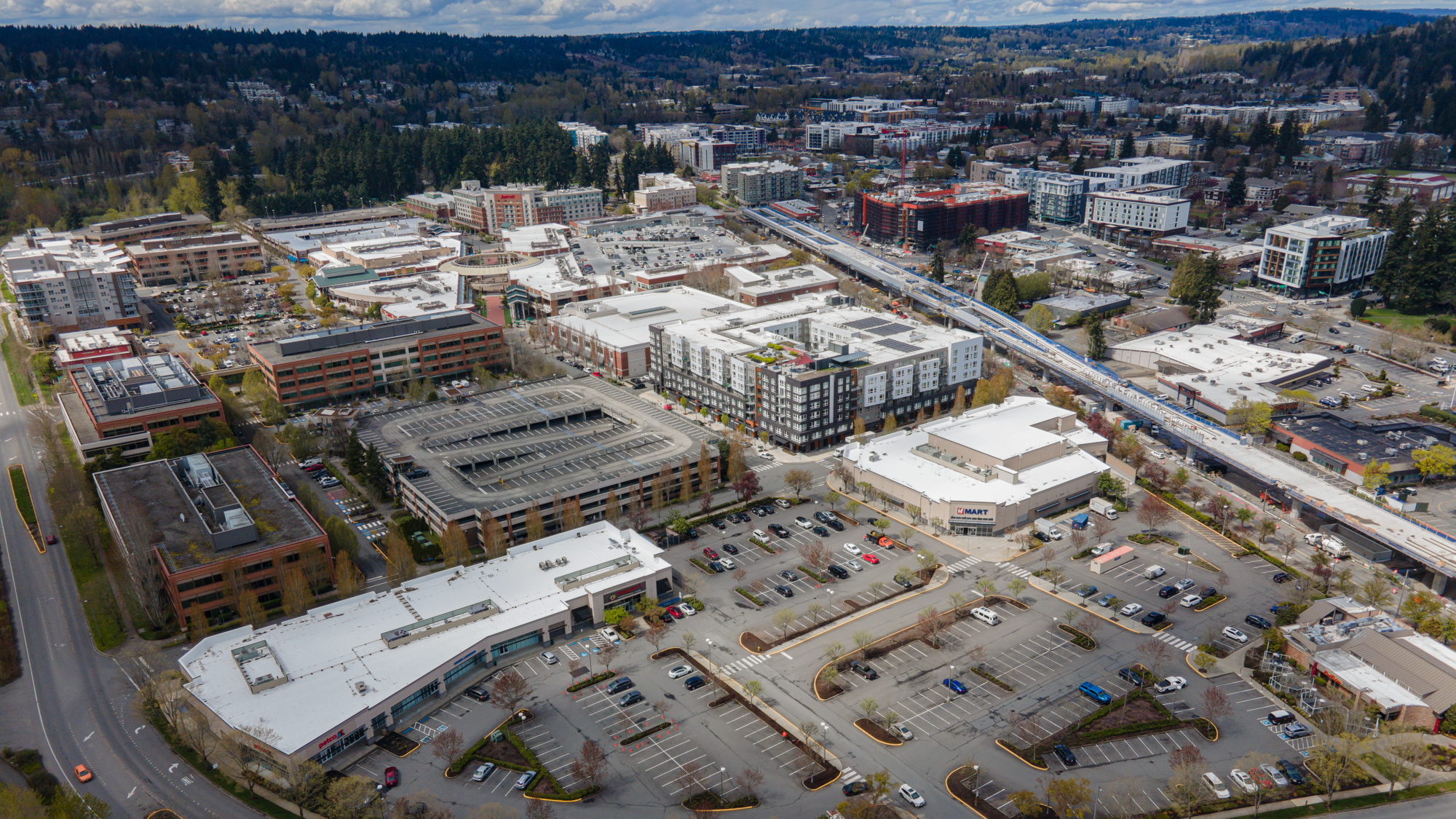
- Downtown Redmond in 2023

- Seal
- Nickname: Bicycle Capital of the Northwest
- Interactive location map of Redmond
- Coordinates: 47°40′34″N 122°07′01″W
- Country: United States
- State: Washington
- County: King
- Founded: 1871
- Incorporated: December 31, 1912

Government
  - Type: Mayor–council
  - Mayor: Angela Birney

Area
  - City: 17.24 sq mi (44.64 km^{2})
  - Land: 16.57 sq mi (42.91 km^{2})
  - Water: 0.67 sq mi (1.73 km^{2})
- Elevation: 52 ft (16 m)

Population (2020)
  - City: 73,256
  - Estimate (2024): 82,195
  - Rank: US: 451st WA: 16th
  - Density: 4,630/sq mi (1,788/km^{2})
  - Urban: 3,544,011 (US: 13th)
  - Metro: 4,044,837 (US: 15th)
- Demonym: Redmonder
- Time zone: UTC–8 (Pacific (PST))
  - Summer (DST): UTC–7 (PDT)
- ZIP Codes: 98033, 98052, 98053, 98073, 98074
- Area code: 425
- FIPS code: 53-57535
- GNIS feature ID: 2411534
- Website: redmond.gov

Redmond is a city in King County, Washington, United States, located 15 miles (24 km) east of Seattle. The population was 73,256 at the 2020 census. The city has a large technology industry in addition to being a bedroom community for Seattle, which lies across Lake Washington on State Route 520.

Redmond is best known as the home of Microsoft and Nintendo of America. With an annual bike race on city streets and the state's only velodrome, Redmond is also known as the "Bicycle Capital of the Northwest".

== History ==
Native Americans have lived in the Redmond area for about 10,000 years, based on artifacts discovered at the Redmond Town Center archaeological site and Marymoor Prehistoric Indian Site. The first European settlers arrived in the 1870s. Luke McRedmond, having moved there with his wife and children, filed a Homestead Act claim for land next to the Sammamish Slough on September 9, 1870, and the following year Warren Perrigo took up land adjacent to him. The rivers and streams had so many salmon that the settlement was initially named Salmonberg. More settlers came, and with the establishment of the first post office in 1881, the name of the community was changed to Melrose. The new name was derived from the Perrigos' successful inn, Melrose House, which upset McRedmond. After becoming postmaster, he successfully petitioned to have the name changed to Redmond in 1883.

The abundant forests and fish of Redmond provided jobs for loggers and fishermen, and with those jobs came demand for goods and services, bringing in merchants. The logging industry expanded significantly in 1889 when the Seattle, Lake Shore and Eastern Railway built a station in the center of town. The first plat for Redmond was filed on May 11, 1891, encompassing much of the area now known as downtown. After reaching the necessary population of 300, Redmond was incorporated on December 31, 1912.

Redmond experienced an economic downturn in the 1920s. Prohibition forced saloons to close, cutting off a large portion of the city's tax base. The forests were declining after heavy logging, causing lumber mills to shut down. The deforested land was suitable for farming. Agriculture became Redmond's primary business, keeping residents fed during the Great Depression. When the U.S. entered World War II, shipyard jobs and other wartime work came to Redmond.

After the war, Redmond's expansion began in earnest. The city expanded over 30 times larger in area through annexations between 1951 and 1967. From 1956 to 1965, Redmond was bordered by the town of East Redmond, which was formed by rural homeowners and later dissolved by the Washington Supreme Court. The completion of the Evergreen Point Floating Bridge across Lake Washington in 1963 allowed Redmond to flourish as a suburb of Seattle. In 1978, the U.S. Census Bureau proclaimed Redmond the fastest growing city in the state. Many technology companies made the city their home, and the increasing population demanded more retail shops. By the late 1980s, Downtown Redmond had become "a series of strip centers surrounded by parking lots", sparking plans for a mixed-use revitalized downtown.

Redmond underwent a commercial boom during the 1990s, primarily due to Nintendo of America and Microsoft establishing their respective headquarters within the city in 1984 and 1986 respectively, culminating in 1997 with the opening of Redmond Town Center, a major regional shopping center on the site of a long-defunct golf course. Since 1990, the city has seen rising traffic congestion as a result of its rapid expansion, particularly in areas of urban sprawl. To address these issues, SR 520 underwent expansion in the 2000s and 2010s. A light rail line connecting Redmond to Seattle was proposed by Sound Transit as part of a ballot measure that was passed by voters in 2008. The first section of the 2 Line, as the light rail project was later renamed, opened in April 2024 between Bellevue and Redmond Technology station in Overlake. It was followed by an extension to Downtown Redmond on May 10, 2025.

== Geography ==
Redmond is bordered by Kirkland to the west, Bellevue to the southwest, and Sammamish to the southeast. Unincorporated King County lies to the north (with Woodinville a short distance beyond) and east. The city's urban downtown lies just north of Lake Sammamish; residential areas lie north and west of the lake. Overlake, the city's second urban center, is to the west of Lake Sammamish. The Sammamish River runs north from the lake along the west edge of the city's downtown. According to the United States Census Bureau, the city has a total area of 16.94 square miles (43.87 km^{2}), of which 16.28 square miles (42.17 km^{2}) are land and 0.66 square miles (1.71 km^{2}) are water.

The city is divided into several neighborhoods that form a ring around downtown Redmond. The Overlake neighborhood, which also encompasses part of Bellevue, lies southwest of downtown and includes the Microsoft headquarters campus and other office complexes as well as residential areas. The predominantly residential neighborhood of Education Hill lies north of downtown and was named for the five schools in the area, including Redmond High School; it was previously known as Poverty Hill until the 1950s, when it was annexed into Redmond.

=== Climate ===
Redmond, like most of the Pacific Northwest, has a mild climate for its latitude, but still gets all four seasons. Summers tend to be warm and dry, with low rainfall and sunny or partly sunny from June to September. Winters tend to be cool and wet, with November being the rainiest month. Snowfall is uncommon, with the most common cold air being in a form of a high pressure system, driving out the rains from the area. However, snowfall is not as rare as in other cities closer to the moderating effects of Puget Sound, like Seattle. On average, the warmest month is August. The highest recorded temperature was 111 °F (44 °C) on June 28, 2021. On average, the coolest month is January. The lowest recorded temperature was −7 °F (−22 °C) in January 1950. The maximum average precipitation usually occurs in December.

Redmond has a warm-summer Mediterranean climate (Csb), with a fairly dry summer peak.

Climate data for Redmond, Washington
Month	Jan	Feb	Mar	Apr	May	Jun	Jul	Aug	Sep	Oct	Nov	Dec	Year
Record high °F (°C)	68 (20)	72 (22)	80 (27)	90 (32)	95 (35)	111 (44)	105 (41)	102 (39)	101 (38)	91 (33)	76 (24)	67 (19)	111 (44)
Mean daily maximum °F (°C)	43 (6)	46 (8)	54 (12)	59 (15)	66 (19)	70 (21)	78 (26)	80 (27)	72 (22)	60 (16)	52 (11)	43 (6)	60 (16)
Daily mean °F (°C)	37 (3)	40 (4)	46 (8)	50 (10)	57 (14)	61 (16)	66 (19)	68 (20)	62 (17)	53 (12)	46 (8)	37 (3)	52 (11)
Mean daily minimum °F (°C)	30 (−1)	33 (1)	38 (3)	42 (6)	47 (8)	52 (11)	55 (13)	56 (13)	52 (11)	46 (8)	39 (4)	31 (−1)	43 (6)
Record low °F (°C)	−7 (−22)	−5 (−21)	9 (−13)	26 (−3)	26 (−3)	35 (2)	40 (4)	41 (5)	32 (0)	26 (−3)	3 (−16)	−1 (−18)	−7 (−22)
Average precipitation inches (mm)	4.49 (114)	3.67 (93)	3.84 (98)	2.84 (72)	2.10 (53)	1.68 (43)	0.97 (25)	0.97 (25)	1.71 (43)	3.32 (84)	4.92 (125)	5.45 (138)	35.96 (913)
Average snowfall inches (cm)	2.3 (5.8)	2.6 (6.6)	1.1 (2.8)	0 (0)	0 (0)	0 (0)	0 (0)	0 (0)	0 (0)	0 (0)	1.4 (3.6)	2.6 (6.6)	10.0 (25)

== Demographics ==
Historical population
Census	Pop.	Note	%±
1900	116		—
1910	450		287.9%
1920	438		−2.7%
1930	460		5.0%
1940	530		15.2%
1950	573		8.1%
1960	1,426		148.9%
1970	11,020		672.8%
1980	23,318		111.6%
1990	35,800		53.5%
2000	45,256		26.4%
2010	54,144		19.6%
2020	73,256		35.3%
2024 (est.)	82,195		12.2%
U.S. Decennial Census; 2020 Census

=== Racial and ethnic composition ===
Redmond, Washington – racial and ethnic composition Note: the US Census treats Hispanic/Latino as an ethnic category. This table excludes Latinos from the racial categories and assigns them to a separate category. Hispanics/Latinos may be of any race.
Race / ethnicity (NH = non-Hispanic)	Pop. 2000	Pop. 2010	Pop. 2020	% 2000	% 2010	% 2020
White alone (NH)	34,593	33,049	31,840	76.44%	61.04%	43.46%
Black or African American alone (NH)	659	876	1,565	1.46%	1.62%	2.14%
Native American or Alaska Native alone (NH)	176	140	179	0.39%	0.26%	0.24%
Asian alone (NH)	5,874	13,702	30,009	12.98%	25.31%	40.96%
Pacific Islander alone (NH)	73	81	94	0.16%	0.15%	0.13%
Other race alone (NH)	145	297	521	0.32%	0.55%	0.71%
Mixed race or multiracial (NH)	1,198	1,785	3,738	2.65%	3.30%	5.10%
Hispanic or Latino (any race)	2,538	4,214	5,310	5.61%	7.78%	7.25%
Total	45,256	54,144	73,256	100.00%	100.00%	100.00%

=== 2020 census ===
As of the 2020 census, there were 73,256 people, 29,693 households, and 18,617 families residing in the city.

The median age was 34.1 years. 23.8% of residents were under the age of 18 and 9.7% of residents were 65 years of age or older. For every 100 females there were 106.4 males, and for every 100 females age 18 and over there were 106.4 males age 18 and over.

There were 31,738 housing units, of which 6.4% were vacant. The homeowner vacancy rate was 0.8% and the rental vacancy rate was 8.1%.

100.0% of residents lived in urban areas, while 0.0% lived in rural areas.

=== 2010 census ===
As of the 2010 census, there were 54,144 people, 22,550 households, and 13,890 families residing in the city. The population density was 3,325.1 inhabitants per square mile (1,283.8/km^{2}). There were 24,177 housing units at an average density of 1,485.1 units per square mile (573.4 units/km^{2}). The racial makeup of the city was 65.19% White, 1.71% African American, 0.37% Native American, 25.36% Asian, 0.15% Pacific Islander, 3.22% from other races, and 4.00% from two or more races. Hispanic or Latino people of any race were 7.78% of the population.

There were 22,550 households, of which 32.4% had children under the age of 18 living with them, 51.4% were married couples living together, 6.9% had a female householder with no husband present, 3.3% had a male householder with no wife present, and 38.4% were non-families. 29.6% of all households were made up of individuals, and 7% had someone living alone who was 65 years of age or older. The average household size was 2.39 and the average family size was 2.98.

The median age in the city was 34.1 years. 22.7% of residents were under the age of 18; 7.5% were between the ages of 18 and 24; 38.7% were from 25 to 44; 21.6% were from 45 to 64; and 9.5% were 65 years of age or older. The sex ratio of the city was 50.9% male and 49.1% female.

== Economy ==
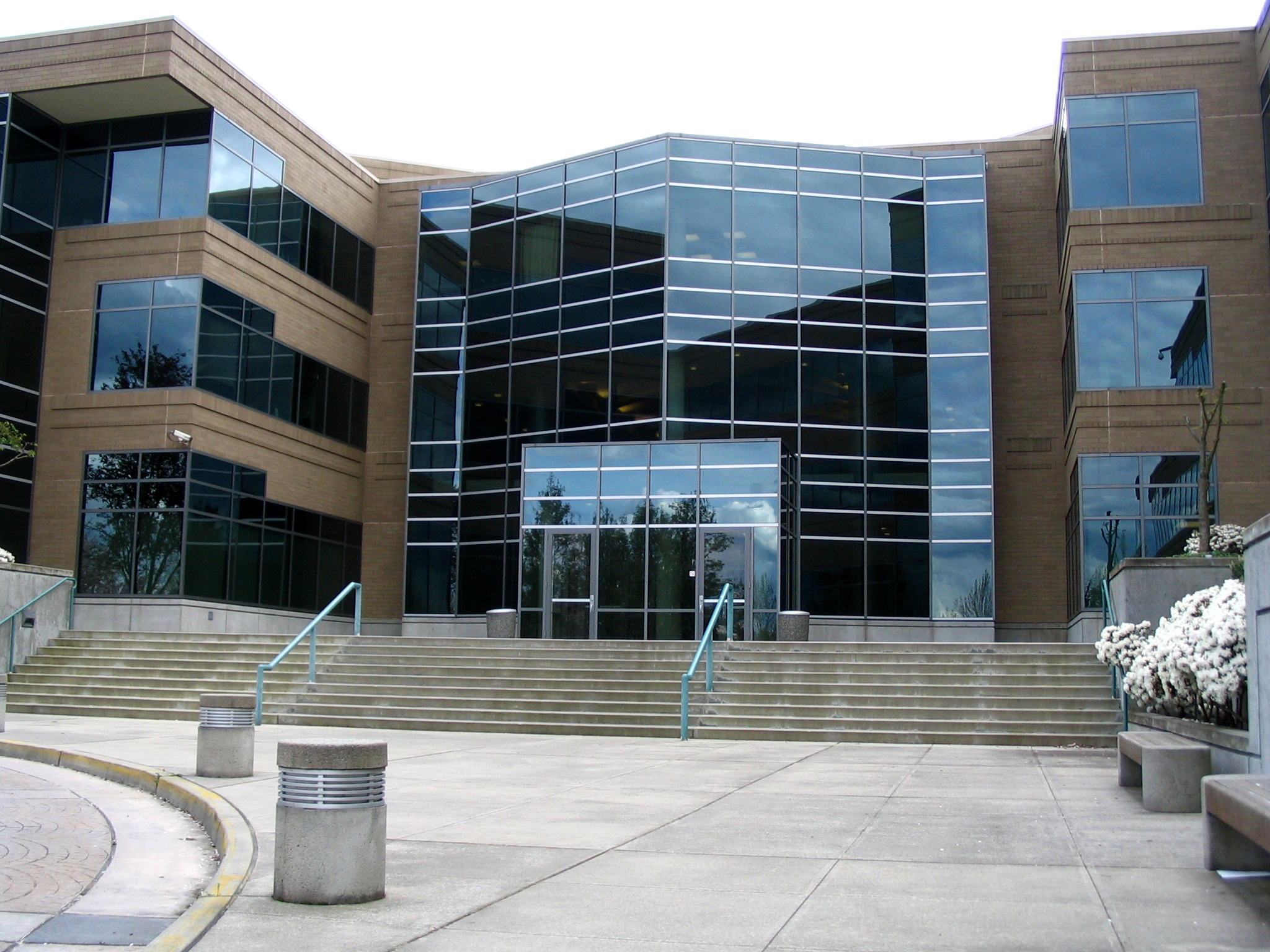
A building on the Microsoft campus in Redmond

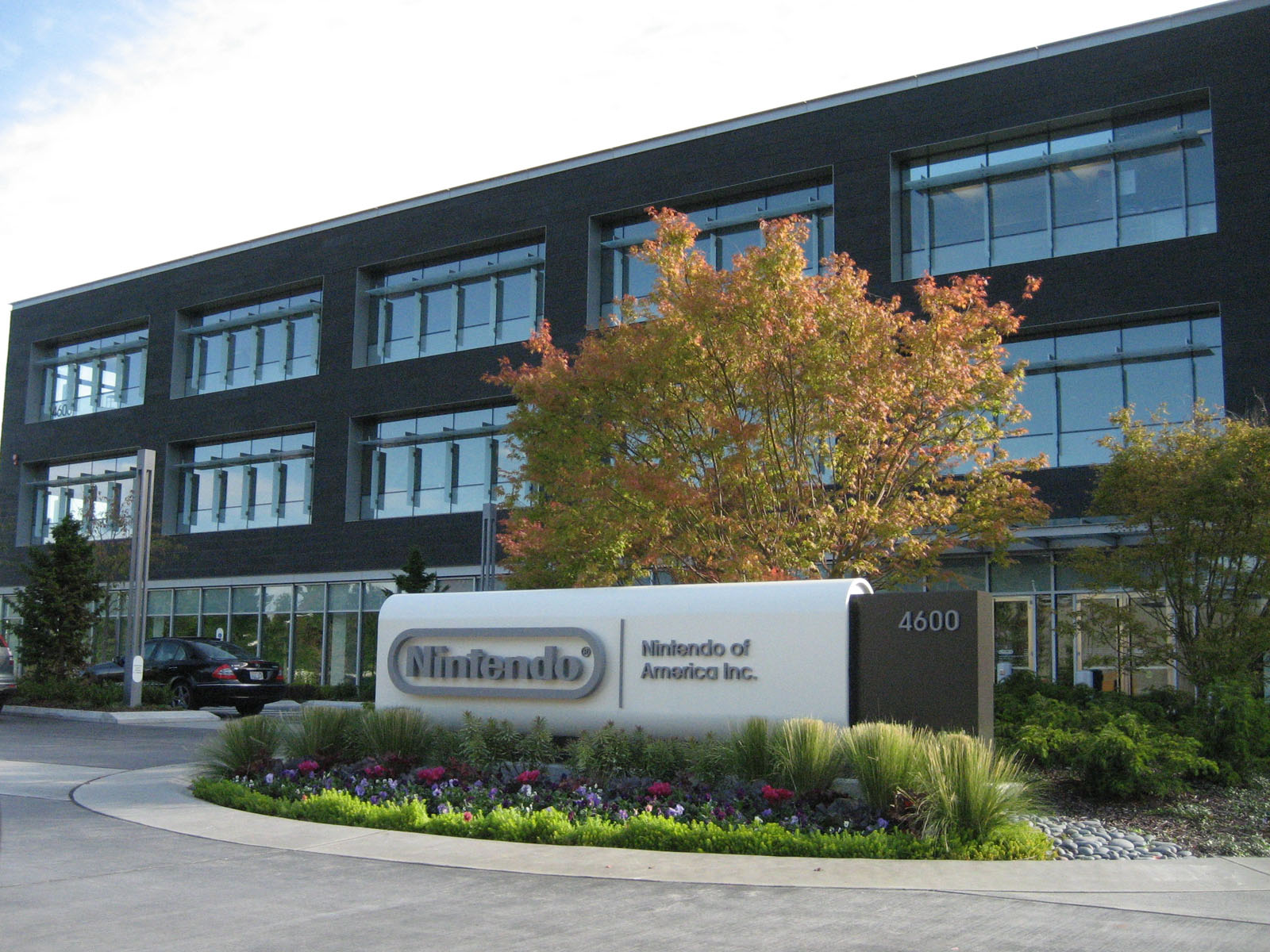
The Nintendo of America headquarters in Redmond

Several companies in the high-tech industry are based in Redmond. The largest employer in the city by far is Microsoft, which moved its headquarters to Redmond in 1986. As of 2012, Microsoft has over 47,000 full-time employees, 45,000 contractors, and more than 8 million ft^{2} (740 thousand m^{2}) of office space in the Seattle area Eastside region, primarily in Redmond, with additional offices in Bellevue and Issaquah (90,000 employees worldwide). In June 2006, Microsoft purchased former Safeco's Redmond campus at 4515–5069 154th Place NE for $220.5 million.

Other companies with headquarters in Redmond include Nintendo of America, Genie Industries (now part of Terex), Physio-Control (now part of Stryker), Visible.net, WildTangent, Solstice (acquired by Samsung) and Data I/O. Meta Platforms (formerly Facebook) has several engineering offices in Redmond, including the Frank Gehry-designed Building X that opened in 2023. As of 2023, approximately 89 percent of employees for Redmond companies commute from outside the city.

In 2015, SpaceX opened a Starlink satellite development facility in Redmond.

Unlike Bellevue and other neighboring cities, the city of Redmond does not have a business and occupation tax on income. However, to help offset the costs of road improvements for businesses, a business license fee of $55 per employee was approved in 1996. As of 2024, the fee is $141 per employee.

=== Top employers ===
According to Redmond's Comprehensive Annual Financial Reports, the top employers in the city are:

Employer	2021		2020		2019		2018	
Employer	Rank	# of Employees	Rank	# of Employees	Rank	# of Employees	Rank	# of Employees
Microsoft Corporation	1	44,782	1	40,646	1	38,026	1	37,305
Meta Platforms, Inc. (Facebook)	2	1,434	3	1,317	10	575	–	–
Lake Washington School District	3	1,422	4	1,294	3	1,718	4	1,328
Eurest Dining Services/Compass Group @ Microsoft	4	1,157	5	1,269	4	1,071	3	1,372
Nintendo of America	5	1,097	6	877	6	873	5	1,004
CBRE, Inc.	6	814	8	725	–	–	10	559
City of Redmond	7	708	9	713	9	658	7	757
United Parcel Service	8	675	10	636	7	755	8	755
Terex, formerly Genie Industries	9	668	2	2,282	2	2,044	2	2,044
Honeywell International, Inc.	10	643	7	748	5	923	6	923

Largest employers in 2015
#	Employer	# of Employees
1	Microsoft	34,358
2	Terex / Formerly Genie Industries	2,656
3	Eurest Dining Services @ Microsoft	1,041
4	Nintendo of America	945
5	AT&T Mobility	831
6	Lake Washington School District	818
7	United Parcel Service	757
8	Physio-Control	706
9	Honeywell	677
10	Aerojet Rocketdyne	530

Largest employers in 2010
#	Employer	# of Employees
1	Microsoft (includes MSNBC)	31,981
2	AT&T Mobility	1,302
3	Genie Industries	1,191
4	Lake Washington School District	990
5	Volt Technical Resources	964
6	Nintendo of America	796
7	Honeywell	727
8	Eurest	678
9	United Parcel Service	600
10	Physio-Control	559

Largest employers in 2005
#	Employer	# of Employees
1	Microsoft (includes MSNBC)	27,855
2	Genie Industries	2,397
3	Cingular Wireless (now part of AT&T)	1,816
4	Volt Technical Resources	1,617
5	Honeywell	1,082
6	Group Health Cooperative	1,074
7	Physio-Control	956
8	Safeco	850
9	Lake Washington School District	780
10	Nintendo of America	723

== Culture ==
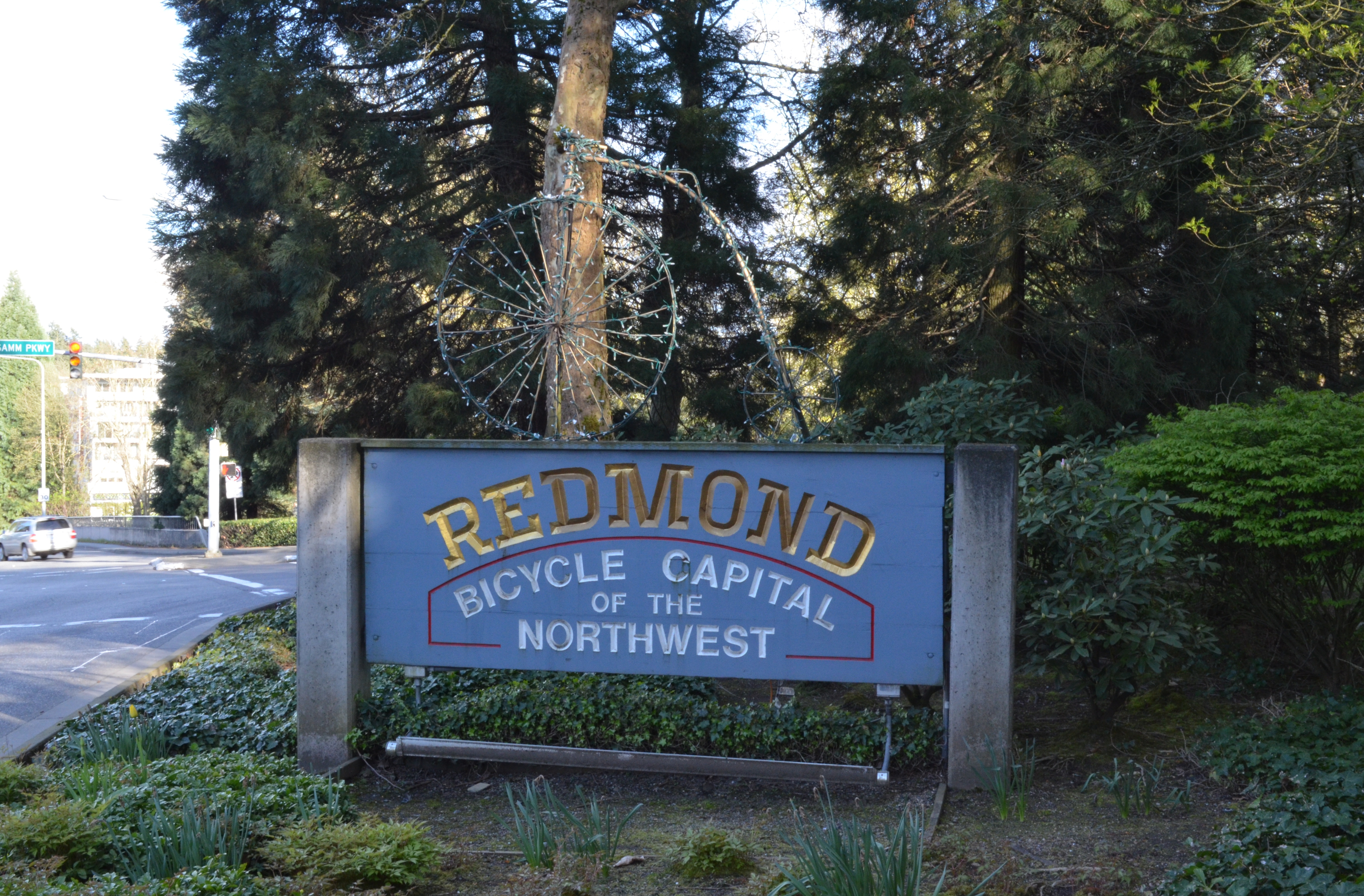
Welcome sign on Redmond Way

Redmond Derby Days is an annual community festival held the second full weekend of July and celebrated its 75th anniversary in 2015. It began as a race around Lake Sammamish called the Redmond Bicycle Derby in 1939, and since then has become a multi-day event including a bicycle criterium, a parade, entertainment stages, a beer garden, local food offerings, a carnival, a drone light show, and other activities.

Performing arts in Redmond include the Eastside Symphony and the Second Story Repertory theater company, as well as artists who play at the Robertson Performing Arts Center located at Redmond High School. Redmond has a collection of outdoor sculptures throughout its streets and parks, many of which are part of a rotating sculpture exhibition.

Redmond Lights is an annual community festival held the first Saturday of December. It features a special guest each year, a tree-lighting conducted by the mayor on city hall campus, a luminary walk on the Sammamish Trail and Redmond Central Connector with musical and light stations along the way to Redmond Town Center where there are many special attractions such as a carousel, skating rink and food sampling.

The Old Redmond Firehouse is a music venue and community center for teenagers. It is described as a hub in the independent music scene on the Eastside.

Since 2010, by city ordinance, Redmond has appointed a poet laureate.

The Concerts at Marymoor is an annual summer series of concerts held at the amphitheater in Marymoor Park. The venue has been host to artists as diverse as Norah Jones, Peter, Paul & Mary, Rob Thomas and Duran Duran. When visiting the Seattle area, Cirque du Soleil has set up in Marymoor since the 2004 tour of Varekai when a concrete base was built for them to set up on. Since then, tours of Corteo (2006), Kooza (2010), Amaluna (2013), Kurios (2015) and Luzia (2017) have played in this spot. Marymoor also hosted the Warped Tour and Cavalia in 2012 and 2014.

Redmond Saturday Market is the oldest farmer's market in the Seattle area's east side. This market is held on Saturdays from May through October on approximately 8,000 square feet of land near the Redmond Town Center. The City of Redmond has approved an ordinance that the current market site be preserved for its community and historic significance.

=== Landmarks ===
Redmond has designated the following landmarks:

Landmark	Built	Listed	Address	Photo
Bill Brown Saloon	1913	unknown	7824 Leary Way NE	
Brown's Garage	1920	unknown	16389 Redmond Way	
Conrad & Anna Olsen Farmstead	1905	unknown	18834 NE 95th Street	
Haida House Studio (workplace of Dudley Carter)	1988	unknown	7747 159th Avenue NE	
Earl and Elise McWhirter Farm (Hutcheson Homestead)	c. 1936	unknown	19545 NE Redmond Road	
Justice White House (Hotel Redmond)	1889	unknown	7529 Leary Way NE	
Lodge Hall (Redmond Hardware, Gerk's, Edge & Spoke)	1903	unknown	7875 Leary Way NE	
O.A. Wiley Home (The Stone House)	1916	2007	16244 Cleveland Street	
Odd Fellows Hall (Redmond's Bar & Grill)	1903	unknown	7979 Leary Way NE	
Perrigo Farm House	1909	unknown	17325 NE 85th Place	
Redmond City Park (Albert Anderson Memorial Park)	1938	2008	7802 168th Avenue NE	
Redmond Methodist Episcopal Church (Redmond United Methodist Church)	1908	unknown	16540 NE 80th Street	
Redmond Pioneer Cemetery	1904	unknown	180th Avenue NE between NE 70th and NE 76th Streets	
Redmond School (Old Redmond Schoolhouse Community Center)	1922	unknown	16600 NE 80th Street	
Redmond State Bank	1911	unknown	7841 Leary Way NE	
Redmond Trading Company	1908	unknown	7805 Leary Way NE	

== Parks and recreation ==
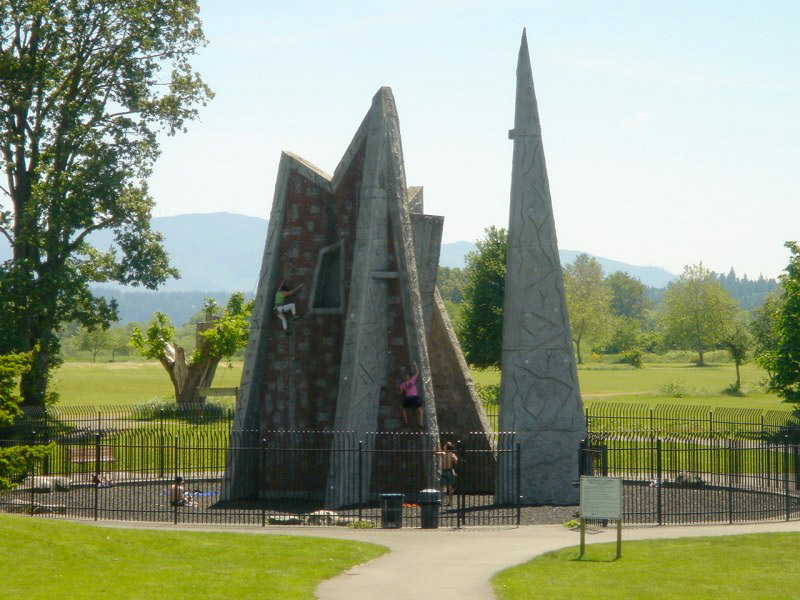
Climbing rock in Marymoor Park 47°39′51.49″N 122°6′41.26″W

Redmond has 47 public parks totaling over 1,351 acres (547 ha). Many of these are neighborhood parks with picnic tables and sports fields or courts. The largest park within Redmond is King County's 560-acre (2.3 km^{2}) Marymoor Park, one of the most popular recreational areas in King County. It features a climbing rock, a model airplane flying field, a 48-acre off-leash dog park, an outdoor theater, sports fields such as baseball and soccer, a playground, tennis courts, a community garden, cricket pitch, and the Jerry Baker Memorial Velodrome, which hosts the FSA Star Crossed – Redmond cyclo-cross competition in September.

The city offers over 59 miles (95 km) of public trails for hiking, bicycling, and horseback riding. The Redmond Central Connector runs through downtown. The Sammamish River Trail connects to the Puget Power trail, the Burke-Gilman Trail (in Bothell), and the East Lake Sammamish Trail.

Idylwood Park was acquired by the City in parcels between 1994 and 1996 and is situated on West Lake Sammamish. The park receives more than 42,000 visitors every summer.

Sixty Acres Park is known for its soccer in the spring through fall and RC electric airplanes and gliders in the winter time.

In 2004, Redmond North Little League won the Northwest region and participated in the Little League World Series in South Williamsport, PA. With Redmond North claiming the Northwest, it is the third team from Washington to claim the Northwest since its inception in 2001. Previous Washington champions were Bainbridge Island (2001), Richland (2003).

The Seattle Orcas of Major League Cricket plan to play at Redmond's Marymoor Park, where a 6,000-seat cricket pitch is planned to be built.

== Government ==
Redmond has a non-partisan mayor–council form of government, with the mayor and seven council members elected at-large for staggered four-year terms. The city council authorized a ballot measure in March 2003 that would have changed Redmond to a council-manager government. However, it was rejected by the electorate, receiving less than 30% of the vote.

== Education ==
Most of Redmond is part of the Lake Washington School District, which also encompasses almost all of Kirkland and parts of other surrounding communities. The public schools in Redmond include ten elementary schools, eight middle schools, and two high schools. The district also offers "choice" schools at all levels for alternative schooling needs. The city's two high schools are Redmond High School and Nikola Tesla STEM High School, a choice school with a STEM focus.

The Bellevue School District serves the city's southernmost neighborhoods, mainly below NE 40th Street. The unincorporated English Hill neighborhood in northern Redmond is served by the Northshore School District, while the Redmond Ridge area to the east is part of the Lake Washington School District. Several private schools in Redmond offer K–12 education, including Montessori programs. The Bear Creek School, a non-denominational Christian prep school, is the largest with nearly 750 enrolled students. The secular Overlake School has over 550 students at its 50-acre (20 ha) Novelty Hill campus, which was established in 1972, and operates a branch school in Pailin, Cambodia.

DigiPen Institute of Technology, a for-profit university that focuses on video game development, moved from Vancouver to Redmond in 1998. A local community college, the Lake Washington Institute of Technology, built its Redmond campus near Marymoor Park in 2005. Since 2018, it has leased a portion of its building to the Redmond city government for use as a community center.

The city is home to Redmond Regional Library, the second-largest branch in the King County Library System. The 30,000-square-foot (2,800 m^{2}) building opened on November 20, 1999, and replaced a smaller building that opened in 1975 and was deemed too small for the growing community. Redmond had been annexed into the King County Library System in 1947 shortly after the system was created through a county referendum.

== Notable people ==
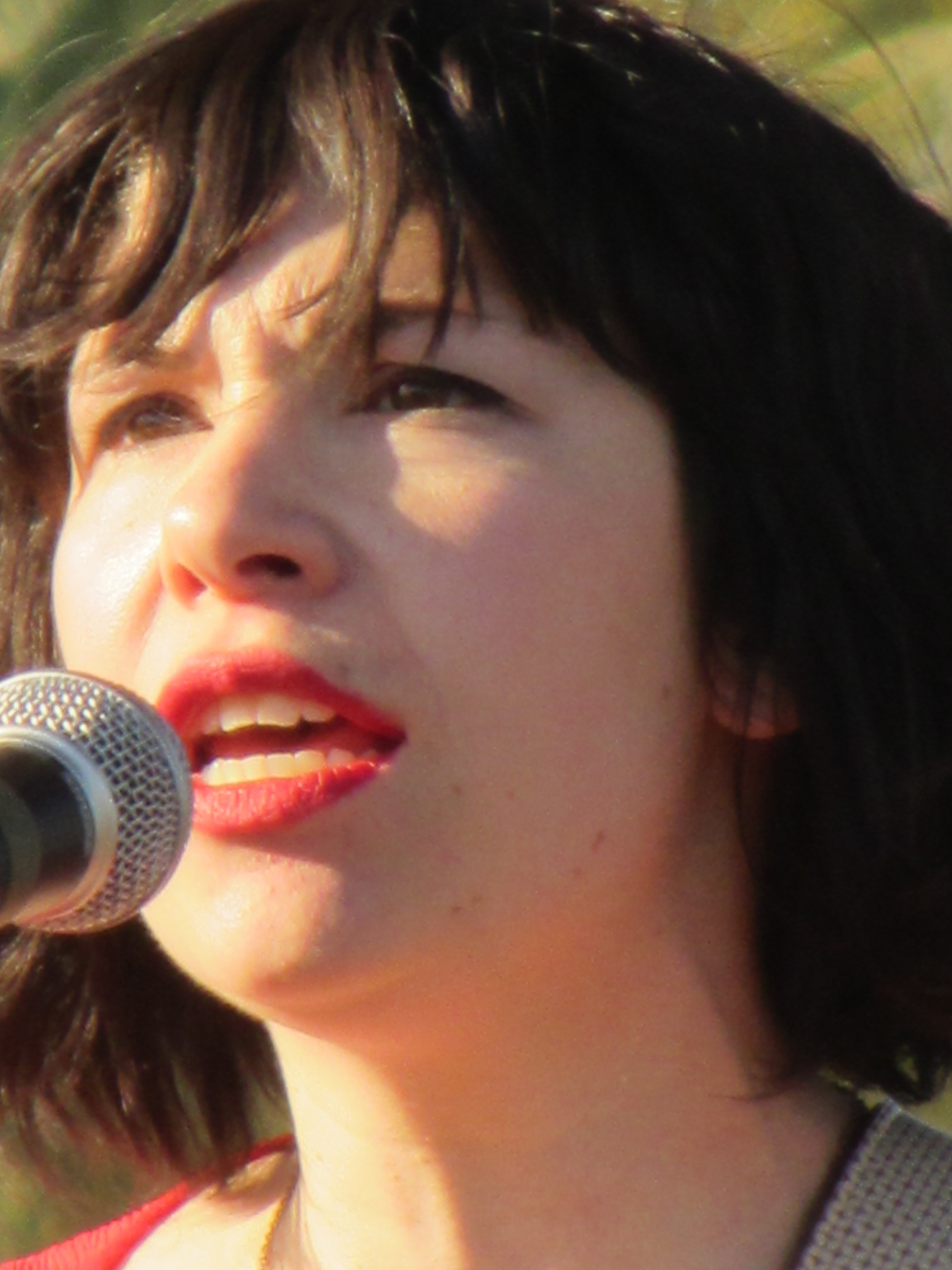
Carrie Brownstein

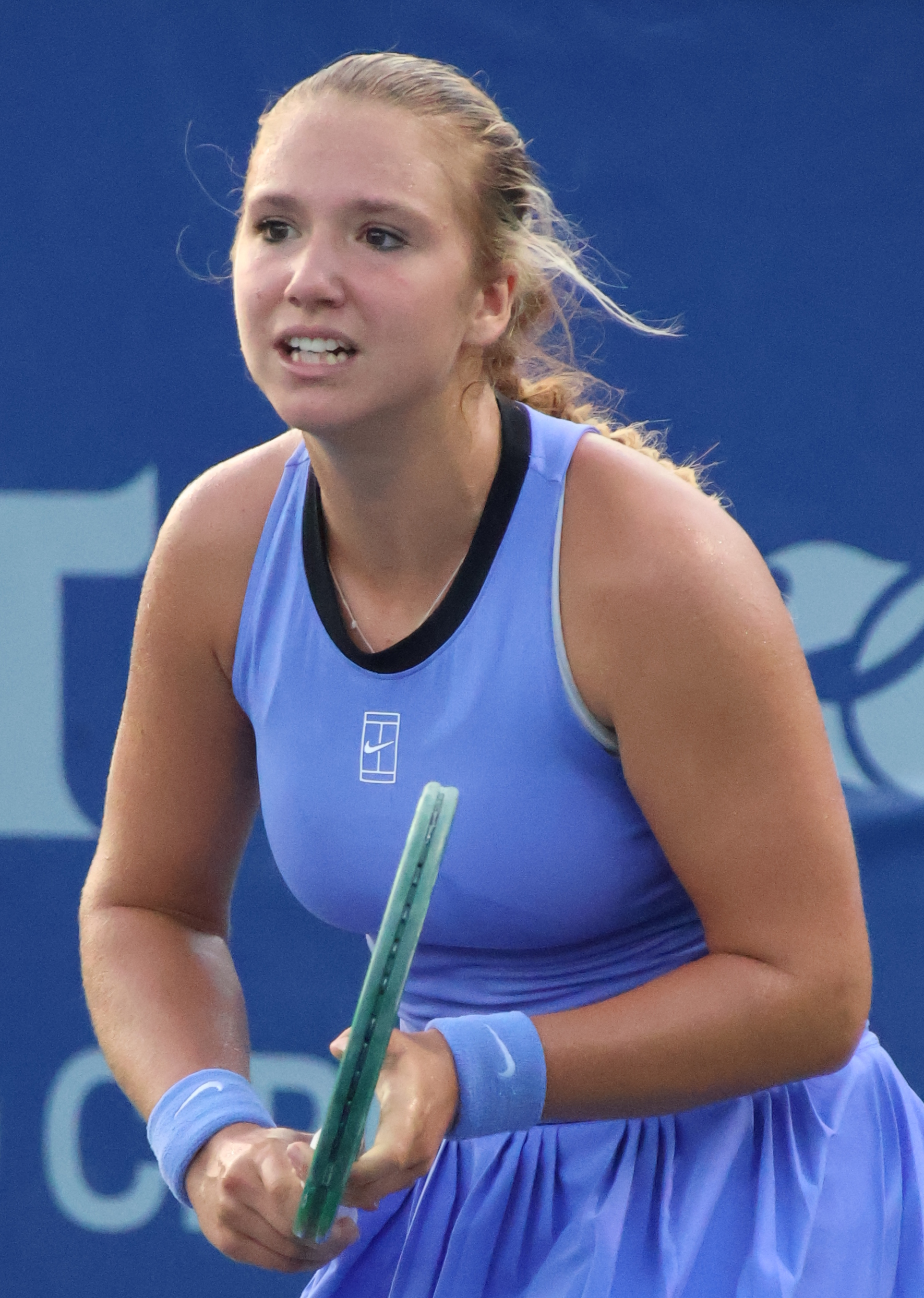
Kristina Liutova

- John Archer, actor
- Karan Brar, actor
- Carrie Brownstein, guitarist and vocalist for Sleater-Kinney, actress, writer, director, and comedian.
- Dudley C. Carter, artist and woodcarver
- Jason Cascio, soccer player
- Aneesh Chaganty, film director and screenwriter,
- Jeff Cirillo, third baseman for several Major League Baseball teams
- Michael Conforto, Major League Baseball player
- Daniel Dociu, concept artist and video game art director
- James Doohan, actor, famous for playing Scotty in the television and film series Star Trek
- Nick Downing, retired professional soccer player, current strength and conditioning coach
- Sandra Eisert, art director, picture editor, and photographer
- Jeannine Hall Gailey, poet laureate of Redmond 2012–2013
- Johnny Hekker, punter for NFL's Los Angeles Rams
- Henry Hill, former Lucchese crime family mobster, lived in Redmond in the late 1980s
- Earl Johnson, winning pitcher 1946 World Series
- Kristina Liutova, tennis player
- Lu Sheng-yen, founder of the True Buddha School
- Shannon O'Donnell, meteorologist and former weather anchor
- Nick Thune, actor, comedian, and musician
- Austin Voth, pitcher for several Major League Baseball teams, now in the KBO League
- Steve Wiebe, Donkey Kong world record holder turned high-school math teacher
