= Sixty Acres Park =

Public park in King County, Washington, US

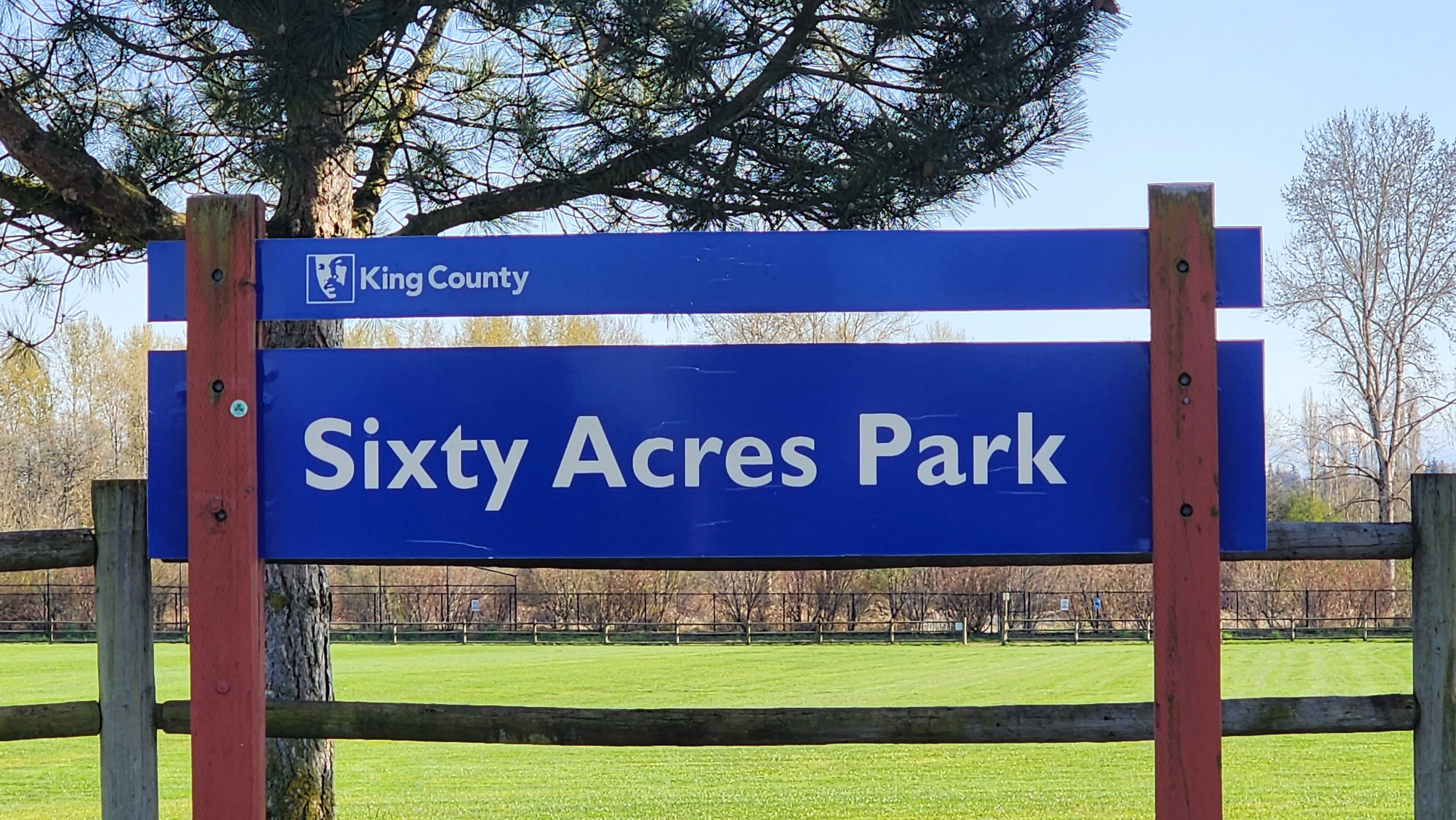
- Interactive map of Sixty Acres Park
- Location: King County, Washington
- Coordinates: 47.7062°N 122.1395°W
- Area: 94 acres (0.38 km^{2})

Sixty Acres Park is a large park in unincorporated King County, Washington, near the city of Redmond. It is located along the Sammamish River and Sammamish River Trail. The name "Sixty Acres Park" is somewhat of a misnomer, since the park has a total area of 94 acres (38 ha). However, it has a total of 60 acres (24 ha) of soccer fields. The park is divided into a north field and south field, which are separated by NE 116th Street. Sixty Acres is home to the largest soccer complex west of the Mississippi River.

== Description ==
The park is well known for its soccer fields. In 2017, it hosted the Region IV Championships for U.S. Youth Soccer. This event brought over 4,000 players and 14,000 spectators from throughout the Western United States to the park.

The park is maintained through a joint agreement between King County and the Lake Washington Youth Soccer Association. The organization planned to expand its soccer fields onto the south field in 2006, leading to controversy. However, this expansion was eventually allowed to proceed.

Due to the park's large open spaces, it is popular for recreational drone flying and racing. This led to creation of the Puget Sound Drone Club. The park is also popular for kite flying due to its breezes.

The port-a-potties at the park were vandalized in 2023, as part of a string of park vandalism across Redmond and Bellevue.
