= Genie (Terex) =

American work lift manufacturer

- Company type: Subsidiary
- Industry: Lifting and Material Handling
- Founded: 1966
- Founder: Bud Bushnell
- Headquarters: Bothell, Washington, USA
- Number of locations: 16
- Area served: Worldwide: Israel, United States, Australia, Brazil, China, France, Germany, Italy, Japan, The Netherlands, Russia, Singapore, South Korea, Spain, Sweden, United Arab Emirates, United Kingdom, Mexico
- Products: Aerial work platforms Construction
- Parent: Terex (2002–present)
- Website: genielift.com

Genie is an American company that manufactures work lifts and platforms used in construction, maintenance, warehouse stocking, and equipment installation. Founded in 1966 by Bud Bushnell, the company operated independently until acquired by Terex in 2002. Genie operates in locations worldwide, headquartered in Bothell, Washington, United States. The company marked its 50th anniversary in 2016.

== History ==
Genie Industries was founded in 1966 by Bud Bushnell. At the time, Bushnell was working for Seattle Bronze, a company that produced hoists in Kent, Washington. Bushnell bought the manufacturing rights to a material lift that operated on compressed air. Bushnell named the product Genie because he thought the hissing sound of the compressed air used to raise the machine's operator sounded like a genie rising from its bottle.

The Genie Hoist was patented by Bushnell in 1968. In the 1970s, the company continued to grow with the addition several material-handling devices, including the Teletower and the company's first personal lift in 1978.

In its early years, Genie manufactured products at a facility in Kirkland, Washington. In 1982, Genie moved its headquarters to Redmond, Washington. Today, the company continues to maintain its corporate headquarters, and three manufacturing facilities, in Redmond.

After moving to the manufacturing facility in Redmond, Genie introduced the first Z-boom in 1984.

In 1993, Genie introduced the IWP. The company followed up that introduction with the addition of scissor lifts in 1997, trailer-mounted boom in 1998 and rough-terrain scissor lifts in 1999.

Also in 1998, Genie expanded its Washington state manufacturing footprint to Moses Lake.

In 2002, Genie Industries was acquired by Terex Corporation, a global manufacturer of construction and industrial equipment. In the years following the sale, the Genie organization was transitioned over to the Terex Aerial Work Platforms (AWP) segment of Terex. All of the company's products are still sold and marketed under the Genie brand.

The sale of the company led to Genie expanding its manufacturing ability to other parts of the world. Genie now has manufacturing facilities in China, Italy and the United Kingdom. The company employs more than 1,800 people in Bothell, Washington, and more than 3,800 worldwide.

== Markets ==
Genie products are commonly used in aviation, construction, entertainment, government and military, industrial, warehousing and retail applications.

The equipment rental industry accounts for 90 percent of all Genie product domestic sales and 80 percent of sales outside of the United States.

== Products ==
Genie produces several types of construction lift equipment ranging from boom lifts, aerial work platforms, equipment handlers, scissor lifts, and material lifts.

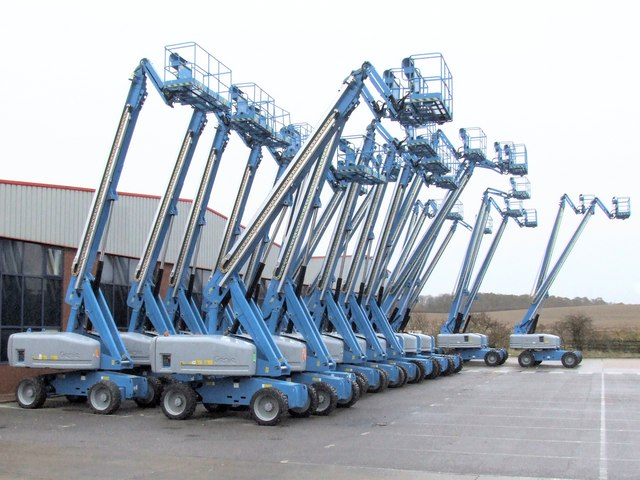
Genie boom lifts.
