= Terex =

American worldwide manufacturer of lifting and material-handling plant

Coordinates: 41.21488°N 81.43782°W

Terex Corporation
- Type: Public
- Traded as: NYSE: TEX; S&P 400 component
- Industry: Manufacturing
- Founded: 1933; 93 years ago
- Founder: George Armington
- Headquarters: Norwalk, Connecticut, U.S.
- Area served: Worldwide
- Key people: Simon A. Meester (President & CEO)
- Products: Materials Processing, Aerials, Environmental Solutions
- Services: Parts and equipment maintenance and repair; equipment financing
- Revenue: ▲US$5.42 billion (2025)
- Net income: ▼US$221 million (2025)
- Number of employees: 11,400 (2024)
- Subsidiaries: Genie
- Website: terex.com

Terex Corporation is an American company and worldwide manufacturer of materials processing machinery, waste and recycling equipment, mobile elevating work platforms, and equipment for the electric utility industry. Terex does business in the Americas, Europe, Australia and Asia Pacific.

== Corporate history ==
The origins of Terex date to 1933, when the Euclid Company was founded by George A. Armington to build hauling dump trucks. In 1953, General Motors purchased Euclid, expanding the business to include more than half of all U.S. off-highway dump truck sales.

Due to a 1968 Justice Department ruling, GM was required to stop manufacturing and selling off-highway trucks in the United States for four years and divest the Euclid brand. GM coined the "Terex" name in 1968 from the Latin words "terra" (earth) and "rex" (king) for its construction equipment products and trucks not covered by the ruling.

After the German company IBH Holding AG acquired its Terex division in 1980 and filed for bankruptcy three years later, GM regained ownership of the brand and reorganized it into units located in Scotland, Brazil, and the USA.

American businessman Randolph W. Lenz bought Terex USA in 1986, exercising an option to purchase Terex Equipment Ltd the following year. In 1988, Lenz merged his primary construction equipment asset, Northwest Engineering Company, into Terex Corporation, making Terex the parent entity.

Incorporated in 1986, Terex Corporation was listed on the NYSE five years later, growing under the leadership of Ron DeFeo. In 1997, it acquired mining business from O&K, including the world's largest hydraulic excavator RH 400, later produced as Cat 6090; in 2010, it sold that business to Bucyrus.

Having acquired Terex's line of heavy haul trucks in December 2013, Volvo Construction Equipment (VCE) rebranded the business as Rokbak in September 2021. Succeeding DeFeo as president and CEO of Terex in 2015, John L. Garrison, Jr. further transformed the business through acquisitions, new-business launches, and divestitures.

In January 2024, the firm named Simon Meester, formerly President of Genie and the company's Aerial Work Platforms business segment, as Terex president and CEO. In October 2025, Terex announced that it planned to merge with REV Group, and that it was looking to spin off its Genie line of aerial lifts.

On February 2, 2026, Terex announced that it had completed its merger with REV Group.

== Products ==
Per a Company SEC filing on May 2, 2025, the business maintained three reportable segments:

- Materials Processing ("MP");
- Aerials;
- Environmental Solutions ("ES"):

The Materials Processing unit manufactures crushers, washing systems, screens, trommels, apron feeders, material handlers, pick and carry cranes, rough terrain cranes, tower cranes, wood processing, biomass and recycling equipment, concrete mixer trucks and pavers, and conveyors. MP brands include Terex, Powerscreen, Fuchs, EvoQuip, Canica, CBI, Simplicity, Franna, Terex Ecotec, Finlay, ProAll, ZenRobotics, Terex Washing Systems, Terex MPS, Terex Jaques, Terex Advance, ProStack, Terex Bid-Well, MDS, MARCO, Green-Tec, Magna, and Terex Recycling Systems.

Aerials manufactures mobile elevating work platforms (MEWPS) and telehandlers. Elevating Work Platforms are marketed principally under the Genie brand.

Environmental Solutions manufactures waste, recycling, and utility equipment including refuse collection bodies, hydraulic cart lifters, automated carry cans, compaction, balers, recycling equipment, digger derricks, insulated aerial devices, self-propelled articulating insulated booms, cameras with integrated smart technology, and waste hauler software solutions. ES brands include Heil, Marathon, Curotto-Can, Bayne Thinline, Parts Central, digital solutions 3rd Eye and Soft-Pak, and Terex Utilities.

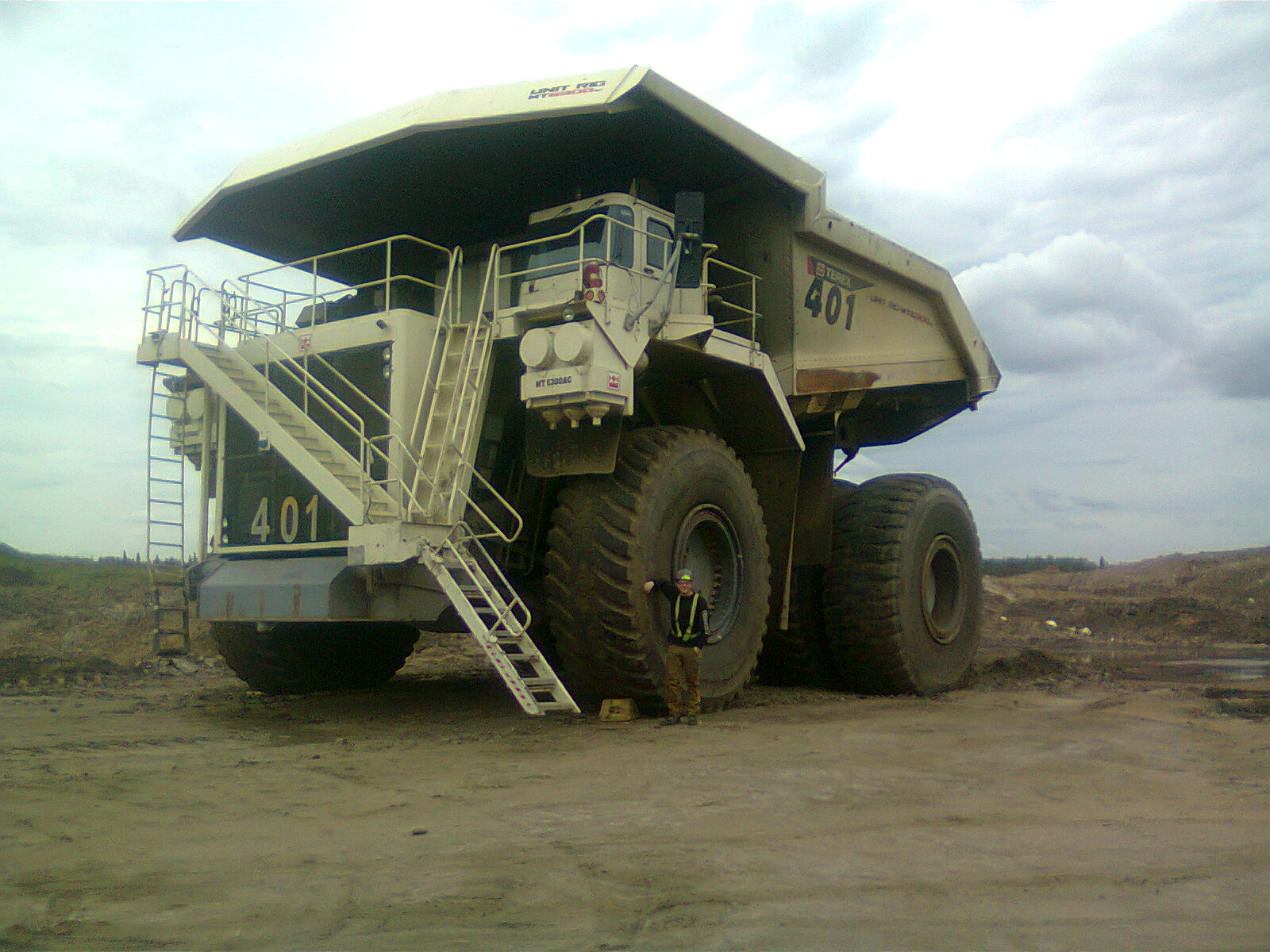
A worker at a mine in Northern Alberta, Canada stands next to a Terex 6300AC "Heavy Hauler". The 6300AC was one of the biggest dump trucks in the world. c. 2000

=== Military use ===
In 2004, Terex announced its joint venture, American Truck Company (ATC), was awarded a contract with the U.S. Army Tank-armaments and Automotive Command (TACOM) to supply the Ministry of Defense of Israel with 302 medium tactical trucks, as well as associated logistics support. Also in 2004, Terex's ATC was entered into a $5.6 million contract with the U.S. Marine Corps (USMC) to "supply three prototype Logistic Vehicle System Replacement (LVSR) trucks". In 2008, Terex-Demag all-terrain cranes were officially tested by the USMC.

In 1992, American businessman Richard Carl Fuisz reported to the Operations Subcommittee of the House Committee on Agriculture that he witnessed the construction of military vehicles at a Terex-owned facility in Scotland in 1987. Fuisz alleged that Terex employees reported that the vehicles were manufactured at the request of the CIA and British intelligence and were destined for service within the Iraqi military. Terex denied the allegations and in 1992, filed a libel complaint against Fuisz and Seymour M. Hersh, writer of an article in The New York Times covering Fuisz's allegations. After several investigations, including a 16-month-long federal task force investigation, no legal charges were filed against Terex. The New York Times, in an editor's note on 7 December 1995, said, "The article should never have suggested that Terex has ever supplied Scud missile launchers to Iraq, and The Times regrets any damage that may have resulted to Terex from any false impression the article may have caused."

== Acquisitions and divestitures ==
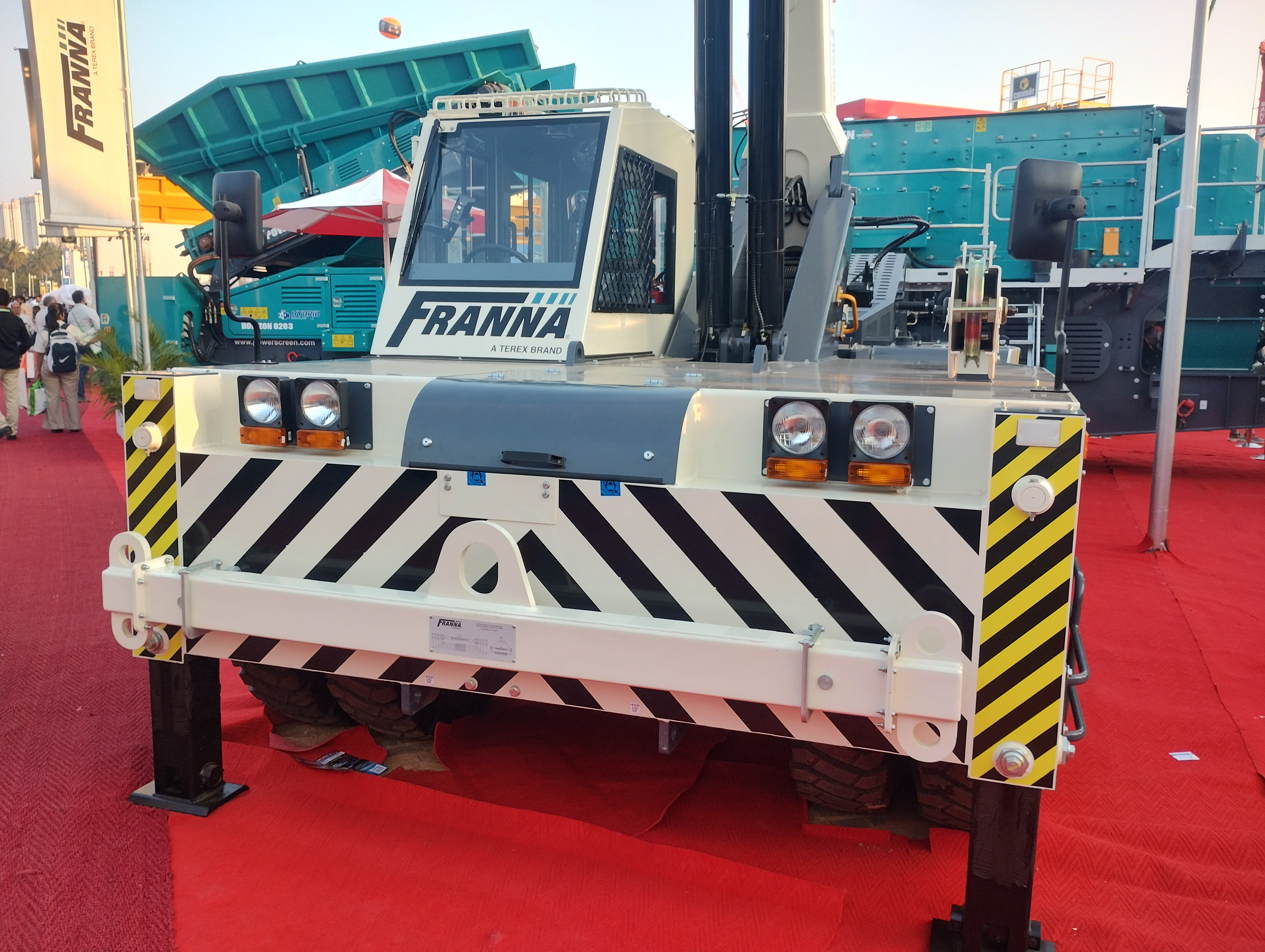
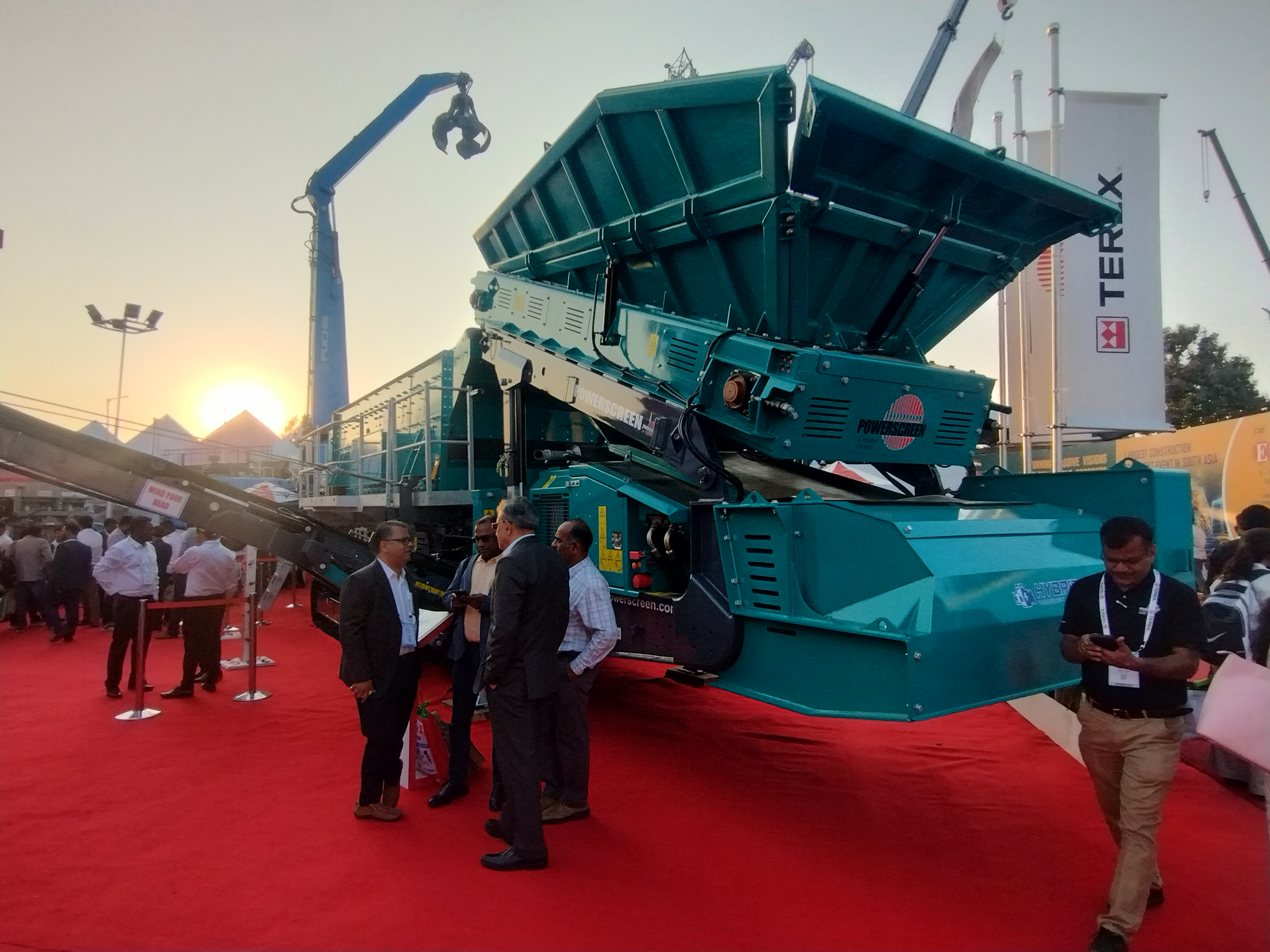
Terex Franna (left) and Terex Powerscreen (right) at EXCON 2025, BIEC

On October 8, 2024, Terex completed the acquisition of the Environmental Solutions Group (ESG) from Dover Corporation for $2 billion. ESG is an integrated equipment manufacturer serving the solid waste and recycling industries. As of December 2024, Terex marketed under more than 30 customer-facing brands. Terex was built through a series of acquisitions, internal start-ups, and divestitures over the years. These and other actions helped to shape the current business portfolio:

=== Acquisitions ===
- 1999 – Powerscreen, Finlay, Simplicity, Franna
- 2001 – Canica, Jaques, Bid-Well, CMI Roadbuilding, Fermec
- 2002 – Genie, Fuchs, Advance Mixer
- 2015 – CBI, Ecotec
- 2020-2023 – MDS, Steelweld, ZenRobotics, ProAll, MARCO
- 2024 – Environmental Solutions Group (ESG)
- 2026 – Merger with REV Group

=== Divestitures ===
- 2010 – Mining Segment
- 2013 -
  - Roadbuilding - CMI & Cedarapids units sold to Bomag.
  - Hauling - Terex Trucks sold to Volvo CE.
- 2017 -
  - MHPS port handling business;
  - UK Construction machinery (Fermec and Benford) sold to Mecalac
- 2019 – Demag cranes business
