= Volt Technical Resources =

Recruitment organization

Volt Technical Resources is an American employment agency based in New York City but with operations throughout North America. Volt Technical Resources is a business unit of Volt Workforce Solutions, a subsidiary of Volt Information Sciences (currently trading over-the-counter as VISI.) While Volt is best known for temporary, technical staffing services they also provide direct (Full Time) placement services. In June 2007, Volt was named #2 IT Staffing Company in the US by Staffing Industry Analysts. According to Staffing Industry Analysts, on January 11, 2013, the Securities and Exchange Commission announced it filed suit against Volt CFO Jack Egan, in a scheme to allegedly overstate revenue and mislead auditors. On January 26, 2011, the company was delisted from the New York Stock Exchange for failing to file its November 1, 2009 Form 10-K and certain other filings.

== History ==
In 1951, Volt Information Sciences started as a tech doc company in New York City. William Shaw and Jerome Shaw created tech manuals for the United States Armed Forces for the Korean War, for items such as maintenance and operation of equipment, creating pictures and tracking parts. In 1957, the organization was incorporated as Volt Technical Corporation. The conglomerate prospered after the war, growing revenue from over US$ 988,000 in 1957 to more than US$7 million in 1961. Net income increased from close to US$20 000 to over US$366 000 during the same time frame.

In 1966, the organization started a computer programming school at its headquarters in New York.

In 2022, Vega Consulting bought Volt Information Sciences.

== Microsoft and Volt relationship ==
Most of the press that Volt receives is related to its close relationship with Microsoft. Most notably, in 2001/2002 Microsoft had significant issues regarding the employment of "permatemps". Their practice of hiring temporary employees through third-party agencies and then failing to convert them to full-time employees within a reasonable amount of time resulted in a class-action lawsuit against Microsoft and a subsequent settlement.

== Controversies ==
In 2006, James Curry pursued legal action against Volt Information Sciences stating that from 2005 to 2006 he participated in actions protected by Sarbanes-Oxley Act and that Volt retaliated by enforcing their new rule limiting working from home and ending Curry's tenure in June 2006.

In 2010, the United States Securities and Exchange Commission accused Volt Information Sciences of misstating over US$7 million in software income and revenue. The company settled the suit without denying nor admitting liability and was not required to pay.
