= East Lake Sammamish Trail =

Recreational trail in King County, Washington

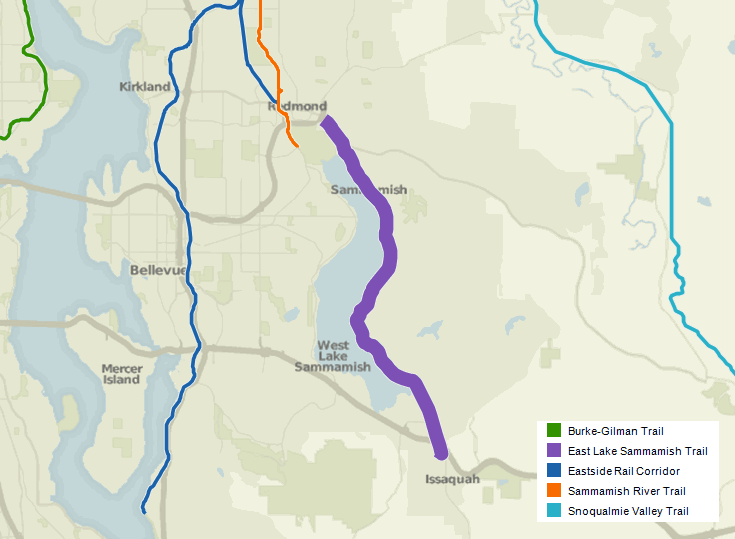
- East Lake Sammamish Trail route map
- Length: 11 miles (18 km)
- Location: King County, Washington
- Completed: March 2006

The East Lake Sammamish Trail is an 11-mile (18 km) recreational rail trail in King County, Washington that runs along Lake Sammamish from Marymoor Park in Redmond, through Sammamish, to Gilman Boulevard in Issaquah.

== History ==
The trail had initially encountered fierce political resistance from nearby homeowners through whose property the former BNSF Railway right-of-way runs. An interim trail, with a packed gravel surface suitable for walking and mountain biking, had been scheduled for completion by January 2006.

After losing a federal lawsuit brought by the Cascade Land Conservancy and Friends of the East Lake Sammamish Trail before the U.S. Ninth Circuit Court of Appeals, however, the homeowners relented, and the trail was finally completed and opened on 21 March 2006.

Improvements to the trail including a paved surface were completed in several phases over more than a decade. With the segments in Redmond and Issaquah completed first in 2011 and 2013 respectively. Before the Sammamish portion of the trail was upgraded in three segments completed in 2015, 2018, and 2023.

A bridge across Bear Creek and under Washington State Route 520 connecting the north end of the East Lake Sammamish Trail to the Redmond Central Connector opened in 2025.
