= Redmond Central Connector =

Rail trail in Redmond, Washington

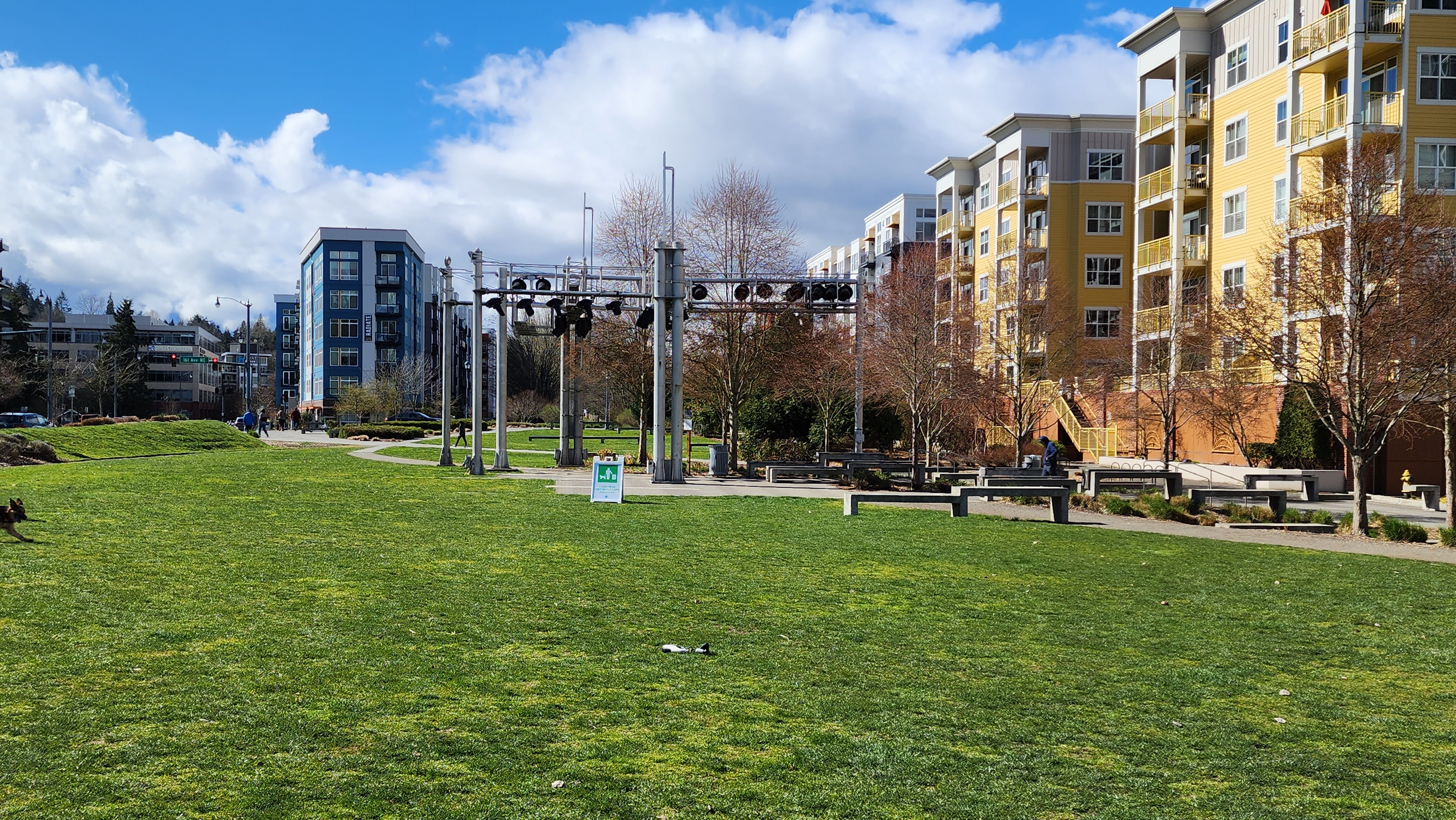
- Redmond Central Connector Park
- Length: 3.9 mi (6.3 km)
- Location: Redmond, Washington, US
- Use: Pedestrian, bicycle, and inline-skate

The Redmond Central Connector, also called RCC, is a 3.9-mile (6.3 km) paved rail trail and linear park in Redmond, Washington. It is a spur of the Eastside Rail Corridor, connecting the main Eastrail to downtown Redmond. The trail features art made from railroad tracks and signals.

== History ==
The land for the trail was acquired in 2010. Construction of the trail was split into three phases, which were completed in 2013, 2017, and 2025, respectively.

In 2015, the city of Redmond won a National Trails Award for the Redmond Central Connector at the 22nd International Trails Symposium in Portland, Oregon.

== Route ==
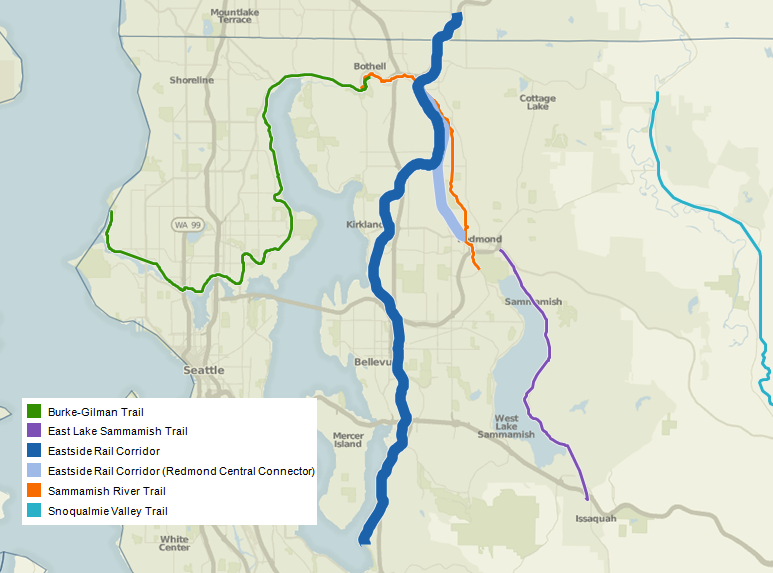
Eastside Rail Corridor, with the Redmond Central Connector in light blue

The trail begins at the intersection of NE 124 Street and Willows Road NE in Redmond and continues southeast along the Sammamish River before crossing the river and the Sammamish River Trail on a renovated railroad trestle. Along the trestle's handrails is an art installation of steel panels, with the words of a poem by Rebecca Meredith, former Redmond Poet Laureate as well as railroad and natural imagery of "Earth", "Air", and "Water" cut into the panels. Pedestrians can descend from the trail down to the Sammamish River Trail via stairs at the trestle or a nearby off-ramp.

After crossing the river, the trail then continues into downtown Redmond, passing through Redmond Central Connector Park and Downtown Park. It passes Redmond Town Center before arriving at Downtown Redmond station and ending at the Bear Creek Trail. Sound Transit constructed a bridge across Bear Creek and under State Route 520 that connects it to the East Lake Sammamish Trail, a continuation of the rail trail.
