= Alison Bremner =

Tlingit artist

Alison O. Bremner Nax̲shag̲eit (also known as Alison Marks, born 1989) is an artist of the Tlingit people of Alaska, whose art combines themes of humor, contemporary art, and Tlingit traditions, using mixed media including painting, woodcarving, and collage. She has also made more traditional Tlingit art pieces, "to be used during potlatches and ceremonies" within the Tlingit community. Originally from Yakutat, Alaska, she grew up in Juneau, Alaska, and lives in Seattle, Washington. She describes her art as "inspired by ancient traditions and modern coffee".

Bremner studied with Tsimshian totem pole carvers David A. Boxley and his son David R. Boxley before making her own way as an artist. She is active in revitalizing Tlingit culture, and has been said to be "the first Tlingit woman to carve and raise a totem pole".

== Collections ==
Bremner's works are in the collections of the British Museum in London, Burke Museum in Seattle, Château de Boulogne-sur-Mer in France, Frye Art Museum in Seattle, Hood Museum of Art in Dartmouth College, New Hampshire, and Portland Art Museum in Portland, Oregon, among others.
