= Pine Lake Creek =

Location
- Country: United States
- State: Washington
- County: King County
- City: Sammamish

Physical characteristics
- Source: Pine Lake
- Mouth: Lake Sammamish
  - coordinates: 47°36′04″N 122°04′55″W
- Length: 2.0 miles (3.2 km)
- Basin size: 1,175 acres (4.76 km^{2})

Basin features
- Tributaries
  - left: Kanim Creek

Pine Lake Creek is a stream in the city of Sammamish, Washington, flowing west from Pine Lake into Lake Sammamish. It flows northwest across the Sammamish plateau before entering a deep ravine, descending into an area of wetland where it takes in its main tributary stream, Kanim Creek. Shortly after, it turns west and drains into Lake Sammamish. It is one of four spawning streams used by the lake's population of Kokanee salmon, and one of two streams on the eastern shore of the lake known to flow year-round.

== Course ==
Pine Lake Creek flows for about 2.0 miles (3.2 km) through the city of Sammamish, Washington, draining Pine Lake into Lake Sammamish. It drains from the lake at a weir on the northwestern shore and flows northwest through a ditch-like channel about 4.5 feet (1.4 m) in width. About 20 feet (6.1 m) downstream the weir, it receives inflow from the Pine Lake Bypass Structure, which diverts runoff from a wetland area to the south. Crossing under the 210th Place SE bridge, the stream enters a ravine about 10 to 15 feet (3.0 to 4.6 m) deep as it passes through hilly terrain at the edge of the Sammamish Plateau. It drops over 400 feet (120 m) in elevation as it exits the plateau, before entering a wetland area, passing by a residential area to the north. It takes in its main tributary, Kanim Creek, from the south, about 800 feet (240 m) upstream of its mouth. In its final reaches, it crosses through culverts under East Lake Sammamish Parkway and drains into the eastern shore of Lake Sammamish. The Sammamish River flows from Lake Sammamish into the larger Lake Washington, which itself drains into the Puget Sound.

== Hydrology ==
Pine Lake Creek contributes about 3% of Lake Sammamish's total streamflow. Along with Laughing Jacobs Creek, it is one of two streams flowing into the eastern shore of Lake Sammamish known to be perennial (flowing year-round)—although the lowest portions of George Davis Creek are possibly perennial.

The Pine Lake Creek watershed is about 1,175 acres (4.76 km^{2}) in area. The watershed is bordered to the southeast by the Laughing Jacobs Creek subbasin, and by the Ebright Creek subbasin to the north. Most of the watershed lies on the Sammamish Plateau, except for the narrow valley along the creek's course into Lake Sammamish. The geology of the plateau is dominated by glacial till, while erodible sandy glacial outwash deposits underlie the till outside of the plateau. Smaller areas of the watershed are covered by peaty wetlands or alluvium along the creek. The watershed hosts several large wetlands, including a sphagnum bog. The main wetlands are concentrated in the southwest and northwest of the basin, and have relatively high water quality.

Pine Lake Creek is one of four spawning streams used by the Lake Sammamish population of Kokanee salmon, although their numbers are usually lower than in the other three creeks. In a 2014 survey, three culverts along the lower section of the creek were noted as impediments for fish migration. Coho salmon and the winter run of steelhead trout have been documented in both Pine Lake and Kanim creeks. Pine Lake itself hosts largemouth bass, pumpkinseed, rainbow trout, and cutthroat trout, while birds such as Canadian geese, mallards, and ruddy ducks are known to make use of the lake and the surrounding area.

The City of Sammamish operates several stormwater management facilities in the Pine Lake watershed, such as retention basins, vaults, and tanks, alongside dozens of smaller commercial and residential facilities. Stormwater pipes are relatively infrequent and mainly exist to transport water to facilities, with most water transported through simple roadside ditches.

== Human history ==
By the 1970s and 1980s, water quality in the Pine Lake watershed was poor, with frequent algal blooms and high phosphorus levels. Studies in 1987 and 1988 found that the creek exceed water safety standards for phosphorus and bacteria concentrations, likely due to residential and agricultural runoff in the watershed. In 1988, an area of wetland draining into Pine Lake was instead diverted into Pine Lake Creek, likely reducing algal blooms and phosphorus levels in the lake.
