= Lake Sammamish State Park =

Park in Washington, US

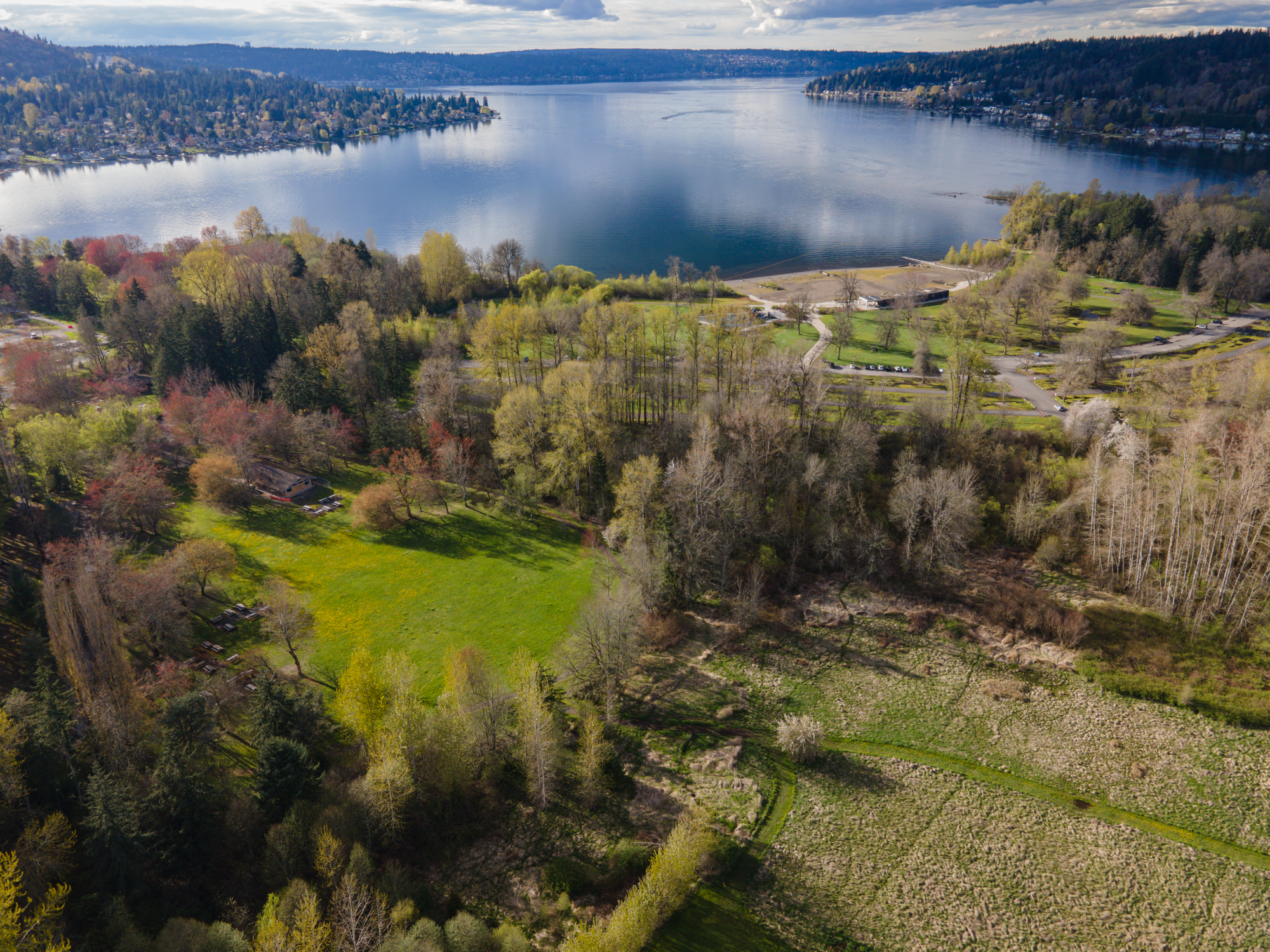
- Aerial view of Lake Sammamish State Park

- Location within Washington (state) Location within the United States
- Location: Issaquah, Washington, United States
- Coordinates: 47°33′25″N 122°03′48″W
- Area: 512 acres (207 ha)
- Elevation: 36 ft (11 m)
- Established: 1950
- Administrator: Washington State Parks and Recreation Commission
- Website: Official website

Lake Sammamish State Park is a park at the south end of Lake Sammamish, in King County, Washington, United States. The park, which is administered by the Washington State Park System, covers an area of 512 acres (0.80 sq mi) and has 6,858 feet (2,090 m) of waterfront; Issaquah Creek meets with Lake Sammamish within the park. It is a popular location for boating and watersport activities, such as waterskiing.

The State Park is accessible from Interstate 90 at exit 15 and the north end of State Route 900. It offers about 250 parking stalls for vehicle/trailer combinations. Local access uses East Lake Sammamish Parkway SE and NW Sammamish Road; both are separate alignments of former State Route 901. Public transit (bus) riders can access the park via Metro Transit routes 200, 216, 217, and 927.

The state park is the center of a controversy over the ecological benefits of beavers.

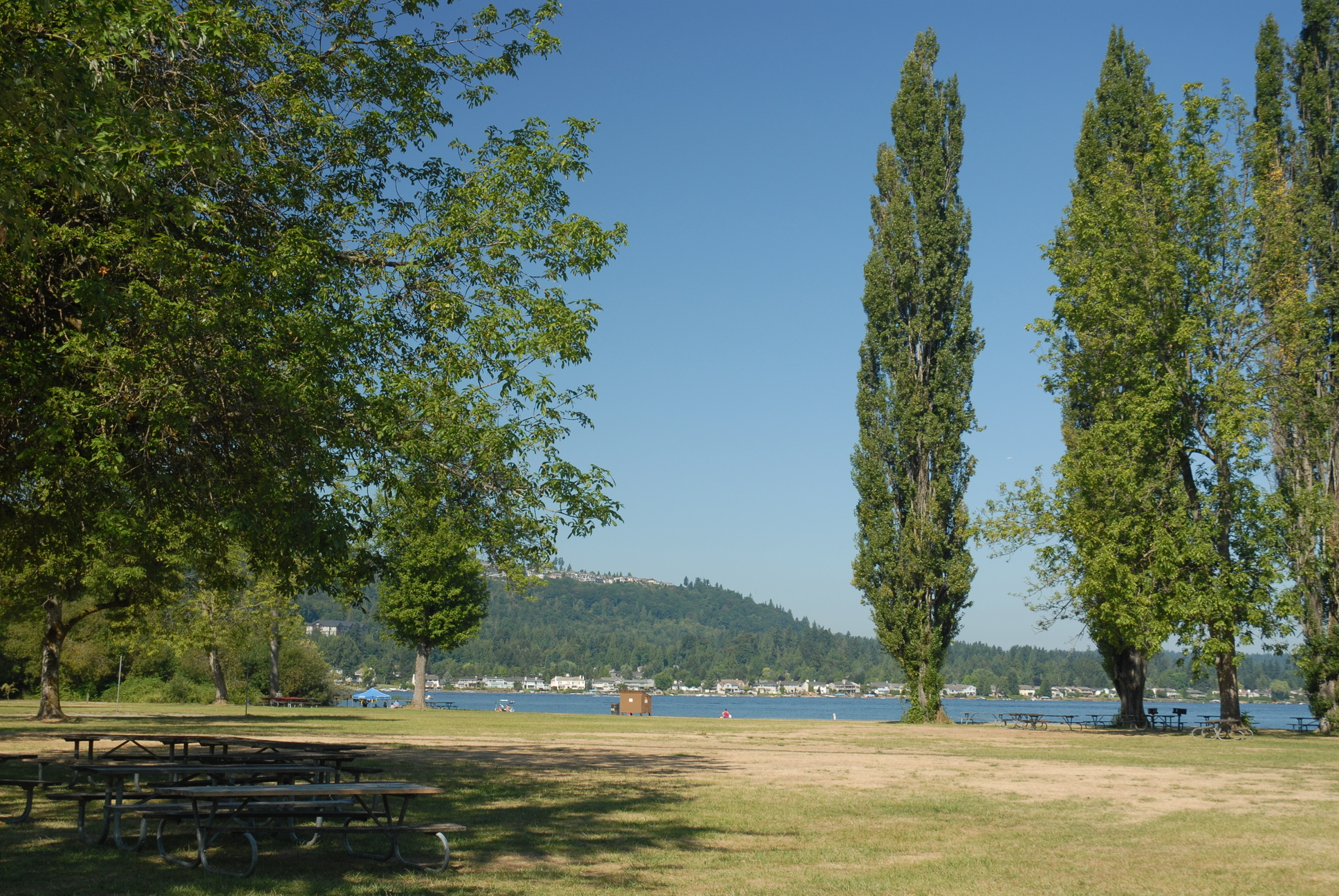
The state park viewed from the southeast end of Lake Sammamish in 2006

== Facilities ==
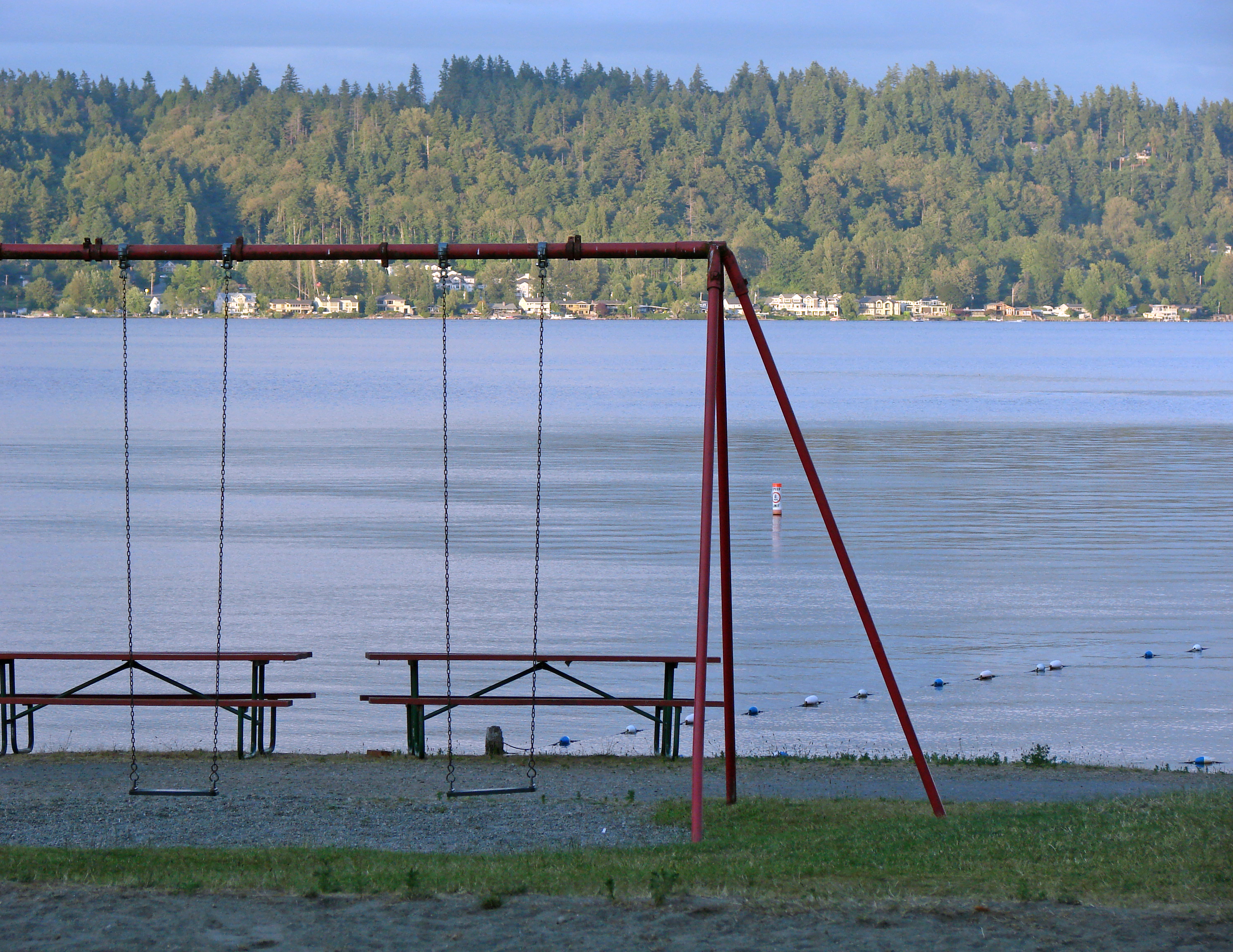
Swing set beside Lake Sammamish

Lake Sammamish State Park offers numerous day-use facilities which allow for a wide range of recreational activities. The park's facilities are grouped in three areas. The area west of Issaquah Creek includes picnic tables and shelters, two swimming beaches (Tibbetts Beach and Sunset Beach), restrooms, an RV sanitary dump, and athletic fields. Parking is available in many lots. Athletic fields include two softball fields, seven full-size soccer fields, and four youth-size (smaller) soccer fields. Separate parking is provided near each group of soccer fields. An entrance on NW Sammamish Road provides access to this area.

The area east of Issaquah Creek and west of East Lake Sammamish Parkway contains a boat launch, trails, and natural habitat. At the boat launch, recreational boaters can access Lake Sammamish, park their vehicles and boat trailers, and use restrooms. The area east of East Lake Sammamish Parkway contains the Hans Jensen Youth Camp. Entrances on East Lake Sammamish Parkway SE provide access to these areas.

== Public safety ==
The park is generally a safe place to visit. Park Rangers, who are commissioned law enforcement officers, and local police officers patrol the park and enforce state laws and park rules. Eastside Fire and Rescue provides emergency medical services and fire protection.

Over the years, however, the park has been the scene of various incidents, some of which have been fatal. Swimmers have been known to drown in the cold water - approximately 50 to 55 °F (10 to 13 °C) in the winter, and 70 to 75 °F (21 to 24 °C) in the summer. Boating accidents have caused injuries and property damage. On July 17, 2010, a shooting occurred at about 9:00 p.m., when the park was packed with visitors enjoying the summer weather. Police responded and locked the park down, while firefighters and paramedics arrived to treat the wounded. Two men died at the scene, and four other men were hospitalized.

The park has also gained notoriety by association with serial killer Ted Bundy, who on July 14, 1974, abducted Janice Ott and Denise Naslund in broad daylight there within four hours of each other. Their skeletal remains were found several months later on the side of the road two miles (3 km) away near Issaquah, the town nearest to the park.

== Natural history ==
The area that now contains both the state park and the city of Issaquah has a long history of human use, dating back to the earliest settlements by resident native tribes. The descendants of the Snoqualmie, Sammamish, and Duwamish people fished, hunted, and gathered plants such as camas from the mixed prairie and coniferous old-growth forest that grew in the Issaquah creek valley. The old-growth forest extended to the edge of the southern shores of Lake Sammamish.

Beginning in the 1860s, foreign hunters, miners, and settlers began to come over the hill from the area now known as Bellevue, and up the Sammamish River valley to the open fertile regions stretching from today's Kenmore, Bothell, and Redmond. Archeological studies have identified trees on the bottom of Lake Sammamish dating back over 1100 years that are there because of seismic activity and landslides. Similar slides occurred in Lake Washington around the same time. The condition of the lake and its surrounding forest most likely remained relatively unchanged from the time of the landslides until the late 1800s when European/American explorers found the valley.

Because Lake Washington was 11 feet (3.4 m) higher in the 1860s than it is today, and Lake Sammamish was 2–4 feet (0.6–1.2 m) lower than it is today, it was possible to slowly drive a steamer up the winding course of the Sammamish River from Lake Washington to Lake Sammamish. The northeast end of Lake Washington extended to the Bothell/Woodinville area. Early efforts to exploit this passage between Issaquah and Lake Washington for commercial purposes, primarily the shipment of coal from the mines in Issaquah, failed because it was so slow, shallow, and winding.

The area known today as the Park and the City of Issaquah experienced rapid development during the latter part of the 1800s. The old-growth forest, including massive cedars and firs from the area of the park, was cut and floated down to sawmills at the north end of the lake, and soon the hop farms as well as dairy farms moved into the cleared areas further leveling the area and burning out the great stumps. Further up Issaquah and Tibbets Creeks, miners moved in and soon the Issaquah area was known for its coal mines. The town was developed to support logging, hunting, farming, and mining. Roads and railroads, and land clearing for homes, businesses, and farms soon changed the area dramatically.

Little or no deliberate reforestation took place so the forests grew back as a mixture of deciduous trees with far fewer native, coniferous forest species remaining. When the big trees were removed, they were quickly replaced by short-lived cottonwoods and big leaf maples we see today.

Human intervention has impeded the return of the characteristic, long-lived conifers and the natural understory trees, shrubs, and herbs associated with native Douglas-fir, pacific madrone, western hemlock, Sitka spruce, pacific dogwood, cascara, red-alder, and vine maple. The drier prairie-like areas hosted Garry oaks and camas, and were maintained for hundreds - possibly thousands of years - by periodic burning by the local tribes. Along with camas from the drier areas, tribal residents harvested salmonberry, snowberry, currant, huckleberry, thimbleberry, wild ginger, elderberry, Indian plum, serviceberry, nootka rose, and other plants for food and medical needs. The understory was filled with sword fern, maidenhair fern, deer fern, salal, Oregon grape, oceanspray, and other plants - most of which are no longer present in the park.

Runoff from the formerly wooded areas increased substantially over what it had been in the water-absorbing coniferous forest with its thick water-absorbing spongy floor and year-round, high-surface-area needles. The increased runoff coupled with the removal of vegetation by development and farming, plus the scarring of the landscape from mining, road building, and farming caused a massive increase in sedimentation into the lake. The development of the giant sand and gravel quarry in Issaquah contributed to the sedimentation load up through the 1980s when efforts to reduce the combined impacts of sediment and human-generated wastewater were finally made effective. The sediment plumes present in the modern-day lake are 20th-century additions to the lake shore. The increase in sedimentation as well as the residential development along the shoreline have combined to raise the level of the lake some 2–4 feet (0.6–1.2 m) above its average 1860 level. The weir at the head of the Sammamish River contributes to the increase in lake levels, as does the sediment load and vegetation now clogging the Sammamish River at Marymoor Park. The bottom of the channel of Issaquah Creek is also 2–4 feet (0.6–1.2 m) higher than it once was because of the buildup of sediment. This build-up, coupled with the significant increase in runoff caused by the reduction in the upland forest, coupled with the general increase in the level of the lake has created wet areas where relatively dry, old-growth conifer forests once stood.

This contributes to the generally wet, muddy conditions that plague the Park most of the year. Restoration efforts have been ineffective because of a lack of funding. One of the most alluring features of Lake Sammamish park is its natural beauty. The park is home to a diverse range of plant and animal life. Including bald eagles, herons, beavers, and otters. The park's wetlands and shoreline habitats provide critical habitats for many species, and the park's staff works hard to preserve and protect these natural resources. Visitors can enjoy scenic views of the lake and surrounding mountains, especially during the fall when the leaves turn vibrant shades of red and gold.

== See also ==
- Lake Sammamish
- Issaquah Creek
