= Marymoor Prehistoric Indian Site =

- U.S. National Register of Historic Places
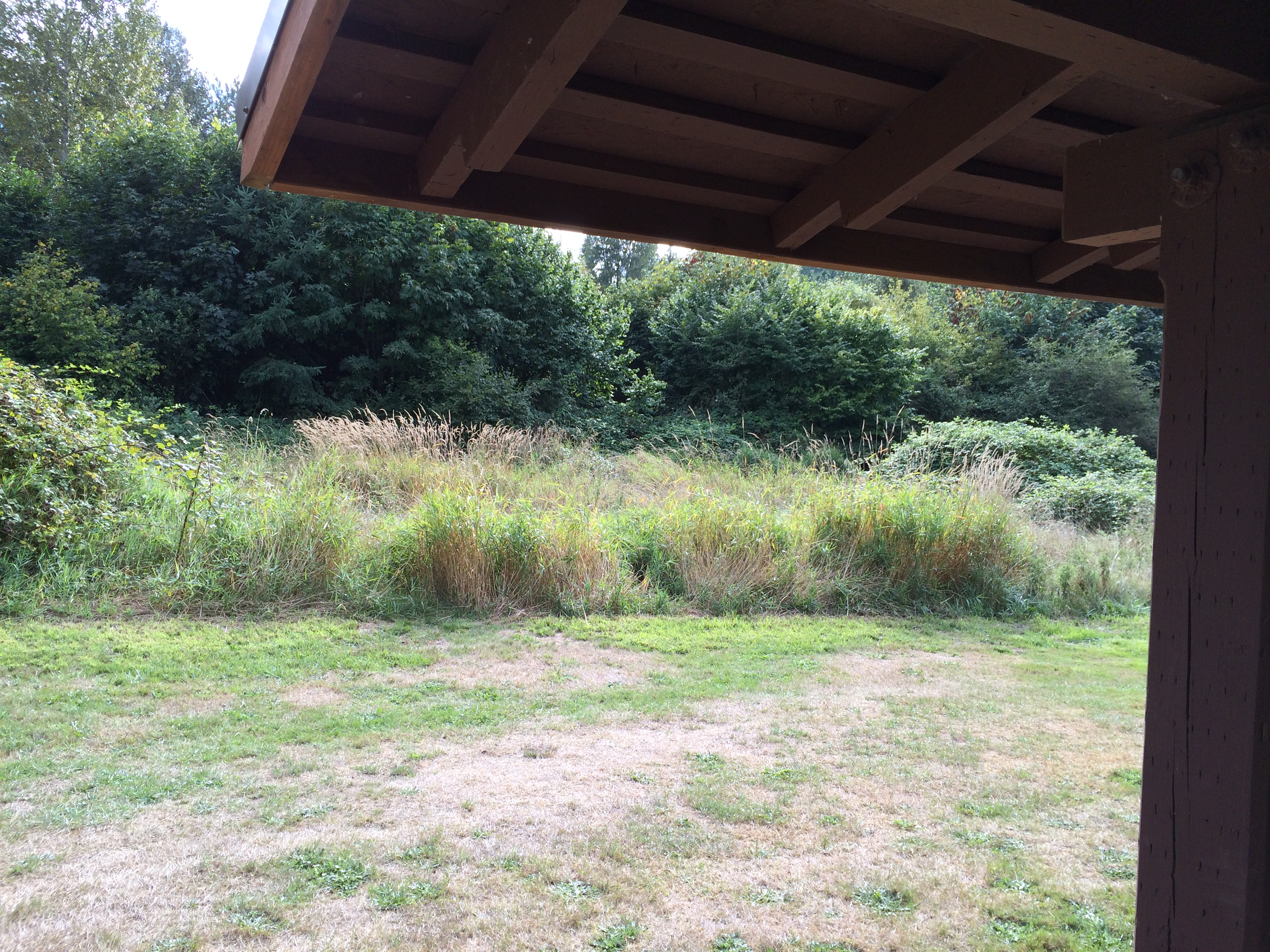
- Nearest city: Redmond, Washington
- NRHP reference No.: 70000642
- Added to NRHP: November 20, 1970

The Marymoor Prehistoric Indian Site is the site of an archaeological dig in Marymoor Park, Redmond, Washington. After King County bought the property in 1962, the site was one of four sites in the park considered for excavation. The dig began in 1964, and continued for four years.

The dig revealed two separate periods of occupation of the site, which is adjacent to the Sammamish River. The first period was around 4,000 B.C.E., and is thought to have been a seasonal camp. In this layer, researchers found stone tools, including spear/arrow points. The second period of occupation was around 1,000 BCE, and appears to have been a more permanent camp. The stone tools found in this layer are from a more varied array of stone than the basalt of the older layer. Much of the stone had to have been traded from the Eastern side of the Cascade Mountains, as they do not occur naturally on the Western side.

Many of the items were exhibited in the Marymoor Museum, which was at the park until King County evicted it 2002. Other items were sent to the Burke Museum at the University of Washington.

== Redmond Town Center site ==
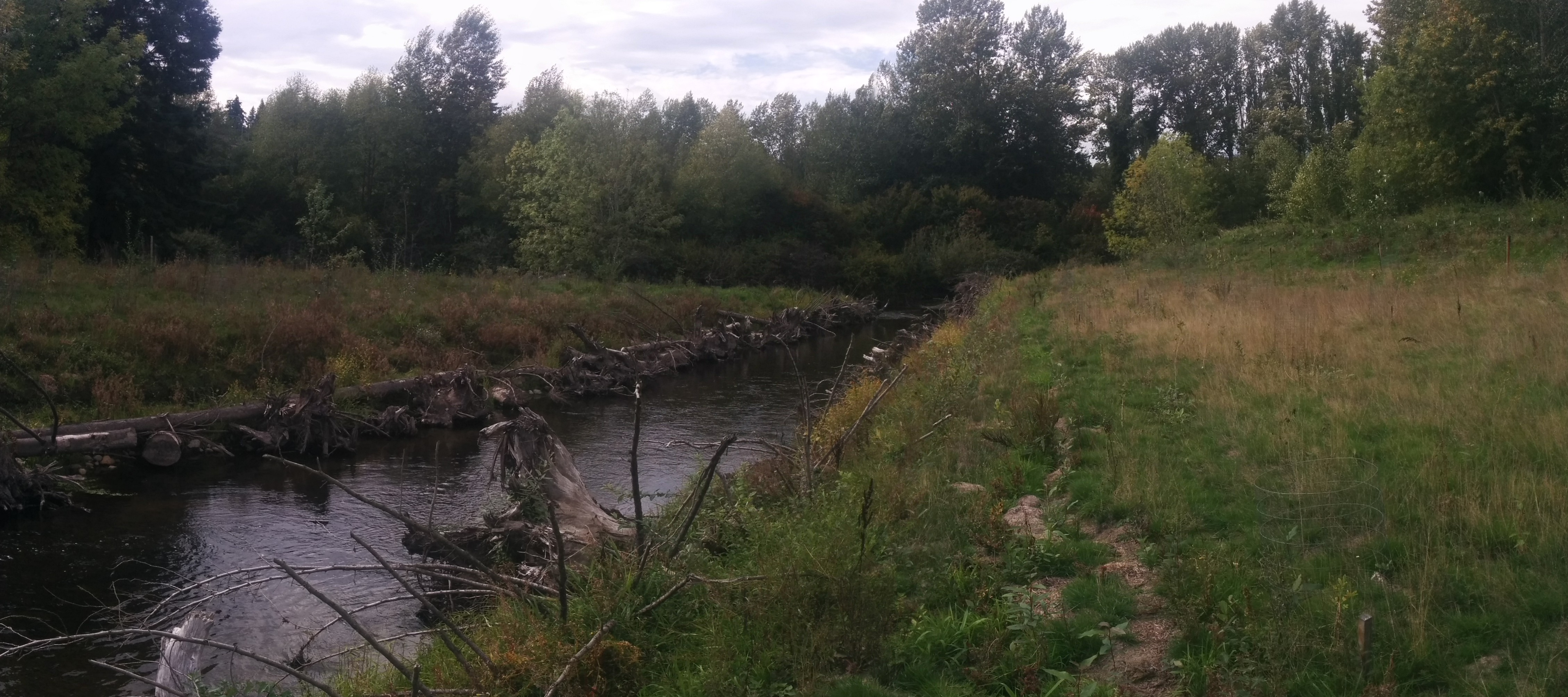
Confluence of Bear Creek and Sammamish River in Redmond, Washington, near the archaeological site

In 2008, during a routine archaeological survey conducted as part of a stream restoration project, stone artifacts were discovered at Bear Creek, between Marymoor Park and nearby Redmond Town Center shopping mall. In 2009–2014, more artifacts were discovered beneath a layer of peat, including stone flakes, scrapers, awls and spear points. An announcement was made in 2015 that they were the oldest stone tools discovered in Western Washington, after the peat was determined by Carbon-14 dating to have been deposited 10,000 years ago.
