= Bear Creek (Sammamish River tributary) =

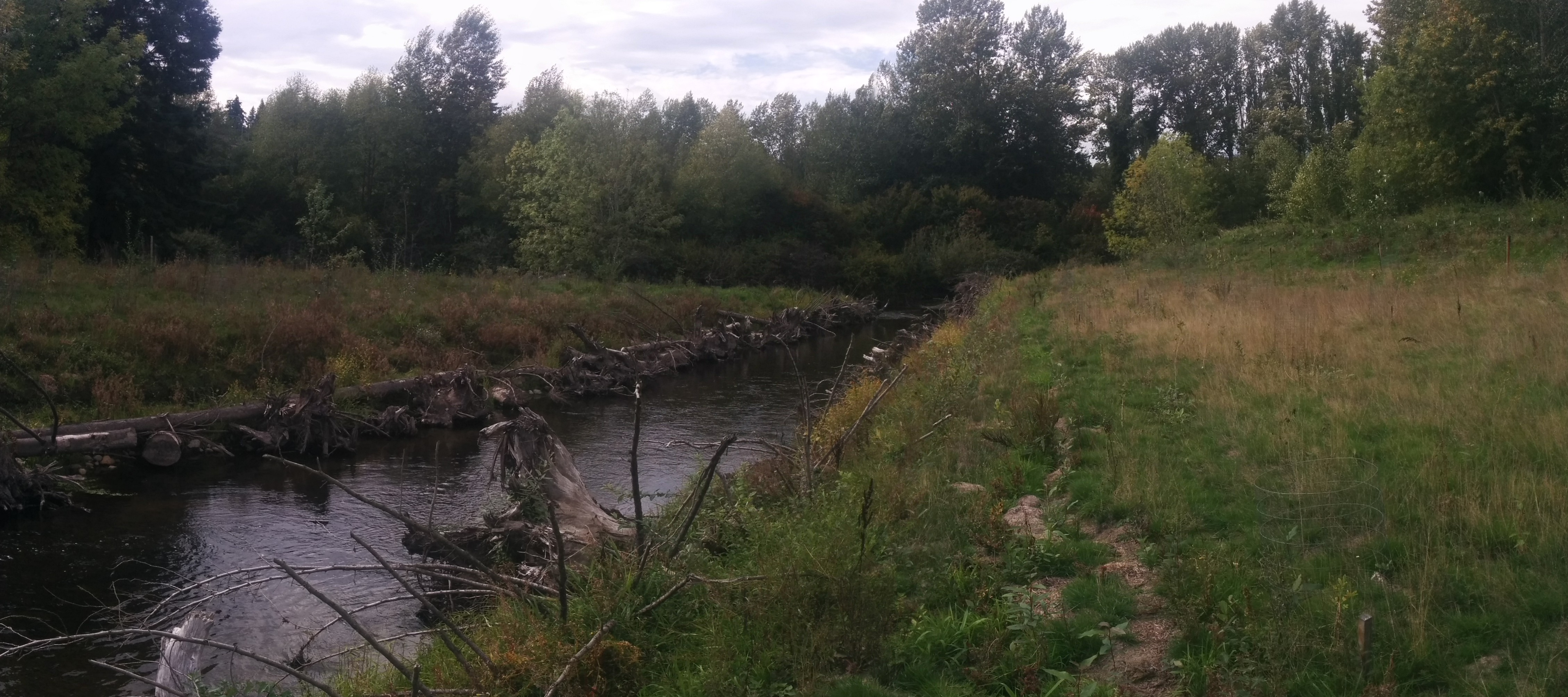

- Location of the mouth of Bear Creek in Washington Bear Creek (Sammamish River tributary) (the United States)
- Native name: tubaʔal (Lushootseed)

Physical characteristics
- Source
  - location: Paradise Lake
  - coordinates: 47°45′49″N 122°03′32″W
- Mouth
  - location: Confluence with Sammamish River
  - coordinates: 47°40′05″N 122°07′35″W
  - elevation: 30 ft (9.1 m)
- Basin size: 32,100 acres (13,000 ha)

Basin features
- Progression: Sammamish—Lake Washington

Bear Creek (Lushootseed: tubaʔal) is a tributary of the Sammamish River in King County, Washington, United States. The stream flows approximately 12.4 miles (20.0 km) from its source at Paradise Lake near Maltby to a confluence with the Sammamish River at Marymoor Park in Redmond. The creek has two tributaries, Cottage Lake Creek and Evans Creek, and a watershed of 32,100 acres (13,000 ha).

The Lushootseed name of the creek, tubaʔal, means "used to be wide".

The earliest human occupation in the vicinity of the creek dates back at least 12,000 years. An archaeological site found in 2008 had artifacts dating between 10,000-12,500 years, revealing the first tool-making site at least 10,000 years old found in Washington state. Some tools found at the site held DNA from ice-age animals such as bison, deer, bear, sheep, and salmon. The people of that time were the ancestors of modern tribes, such as the Muckleshoot, Snoqualmie, Tulalip, and Stillaguamish. Nearby, the Marymoor Prehistoric Indian Site in Redmond shows human occupation in the vicinity of the creek with artifacts on its banks dating to 4,000 BCE.

From 2009-2013, the city of Redmond constructed the first phase of revitalization of the creek. The project hopes to return the industrialized creek to a "more natural state" in order to support salmon habitat and other wildlife.
