= Paradise Lake (Washington) =

Lake in King County, Washington, USA

- Location within Washington (state) Location within the United States
- Location: King County, Washington
- Coordinates: 47.7735290°N 122.0683272°W
- Catchment area: 2,419 acres (979 ha)
- Basin countries: United States
- Surface area: 18 acres (7.3 ha)
- Average depth: 17 ft (5.2 m)
- Max. depth: 28 ft (8.5 m)
- Surface elevation: 259 ft (79 m)

Paradise Lake is a small freshwater lake in the north of King County, Washington, USA, located two miles east of Woodinville. The lake has no public access boat launch. It feeds into Bear Creek, which flows towards the Sammamish River at Redmond.

Fish in the lake include cutthroat trout, rainbow trout, and sockeye salmon as well as rock bass, pumpkinseed, walleye, largemouth bass, smallmouth bass, northern pike and yellow perch. A fishing license is required.

The lake was formerly used to raise non-native bullfrogs (Rana catesbeiana) for the restaurant industry, and a high population of bullfrogs remains. The lake is also home to a very rare species of mollusk, Valvata mergella, collected by W. J. Eyerdam in 1941, B. R. Bales in 1958, and T. J. Frest and E. J. Johannes in 1995.

Water quality in the lake was classified as eutrophic by the King County Department of Natural Resources and Parks in 2003. The water was monitored by volunteers between 1996 and 2008. The water temperature was found to vary between 4 °C and 22 °C and thermal stratification during the summer was found to be stable. Two significant peaks in the algae population were detected, predominantly Dinobryon and other chrysophytes, in late May and in late September. Other species detected include several cryptophyte species and the diatom Asterionella formosa. Phosphorus content was found to be significantly higher in the depths through sedimentary release.
