= Eastside Fire and Rescue =

Operational area
- Country: United States
- State: Washington
- County: King County

Agency overview
- Established: January 1, 1999
- Annual calls: 9,819 (2015)
- Employees: 226 (2013)
- Staffing: Combination
- Fire chief: Will Aho
- IAFF: 1762

Facilities and equipment
- Battalions: 5
- Stations: 14
- Engines: 9
- Trucks: 1
- Rescues: 1
- Ambulances: 17
- Tenders: 4
- Wildland: 1
- Light and air: 1

Website
- Official website
- IAFF website

The Eastside Fire and Rescue is a fire department providing fire protection and emergency medical services in the eastern portion of King County, Washington. The department is responsible for services in the communities of Carnation, Issaquah, North Bend, Preston, Sammamish, Tiger Mountain and Wilderness Rim. In total, Eastside Fire & Rescue's service area is 190 square miles (490 km^{2}) with a population of over 120,000.

== History ==
Eastside Fire and Rescue was formed in 1999 as a joint fire department by three cities and two Fire Protection Districts. These municipalities use an Interlocal Agreement to establish how Eastside Fire & Rescue operates. Participating cities are Carnation, Issaquah, North Bend, Preston, Sammamish, Tiger Mountain, Woodinville, and Wilderness Rim. King County Fire District 10 and King County Fire District 38 are also participating agencies. The consolidation was prompted by the municipalities' desire to provide better fire protection and emergency medical services to the general public in a cost-effective manner.

== Stations and apparatus ==
As of July 2017, the department has 14 stations spread across 5 battalions.

Fire Station Number	Neighborhood	Engine Company	Ladder Company	Aid or Medic unit	Special Unit	Chief Unit	Battalion
71	Sunset Way		Ladder 171	Aid 171	Tender 171		1
72	Maple Street	Engine 172			Tender 172	Battalion 171	1
73	Issaquah Highlands	Engine 173		Medic 104	Rescue 173 Tender 173		1
74	Preston	Engine 74		Aid 74			1
76	Tiger Mountain			Aid 276			1
78	May Valley	Engine 178		Aid 178	Brush 178		3
79	Maple Hills			Aid 79			3
81	Pine Lake	Engine 181			Air 81		2
82	Sahalee	Engine 182					2
83	Klahanie	Engine 183		Aid 183			2
85	Carnation	Engine 185		Aid 185	Tender 185		4
86	Lake Joy			Aid 86			4
87	North Bend	Engine 187		Aid 187; Medic 103	Tender 187 Brush 187		5
88	Wilderness Rim			Aid 288			5
