= Beaver Lake (King County, Washington) =

Lake in King County, Washington

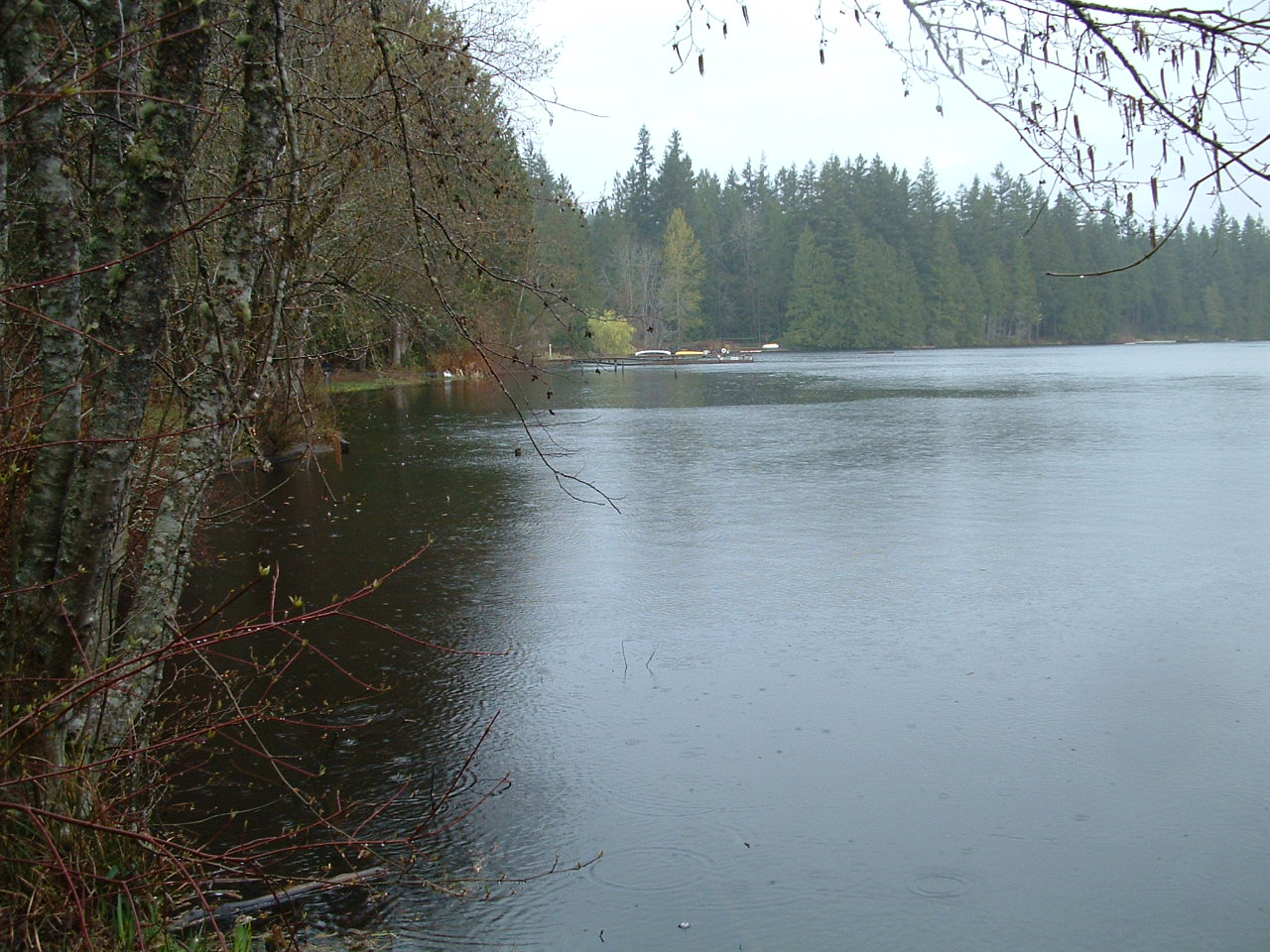
- On a rainy day

- Location within Washington (state) Location within the United States
- Location: Sammamish, King County, Washington, United States
- Coordinates: 47°35′28″N 121°59′47″W Beaver Lake; 47°35′21″N 121°59′59″W Beaver Lakes
- Catchment area: 1,043 acres (422.1 ha)
- Basin countries: United States
- Surface area: 79 acres (32 ha)
- Average depth: 21 ft (6.4 m)
- Max. depth: 50 ft (15 m)
- Surface elevation: 413 feet (126 m)

Beaver Lake is a 79-acre (0.3 km^{2}) lake completely within the city limits of Sammamish, Washington. The Beaver Lake watershed is 1,043 acres (4.2 km^{2}); the mean depth is 21 feet (6.4 m), and the maximum depth is 50 feet (15 m). Beaver Lake is actually a chain of one main and two smaller lakes, with the main lake getting the bulk of the recreation focus.

Beaver Lake is part of a chain of three lakes: Long Lake, Beaver Lake, and a third unnamed lake, 4 miles (6.4 km) East of Lake Sammamish. It is drained by Laughing Jacobs Creek, a tributary of Lake Sammamish.

There is public access via Beaver Lake Park, located at the southwest corner of the lake. Boaters are not allowed to use gasoline motors, but fishing is still a popular recreational activity on the lake. The boat launch site is not located within the Park, but rather via a WDFD water access site. The lake is also used for the swimming leg of the annual Beaver Lake Triathlon, which starts in the park.

== Ecology ==
Beaver Lake has been historically a habitat for beavers, from which it was named. Beaver Lake "may soon need a name change" because flooding of some homeowner's docks, has prompted the Sammamish Parks and Recreation Department to obtain an emergency permit from the Washington Department of Ecology to relocate a family of beavers (Castor canadensis) that built a dam on Laughing Jacobs Creek, raising the lake's level. Beaver have been shown to increase salmon and trout abundance and size in several ways: their ponds recharge water tables which replenish stream flows in the dry season, provide critical habitat for young salmonids, and remove sediment loads from streams. Contrary to popular myth, most beaver dams do not pose barriers to trout and salmon migration, although they may be restricted seasonally during periods of low stream flows. Insect, invertebrate, fish, mammal, and bird diversity are also expanded. Water levels behind beaver dams can be controlled easily with flow devices such as a Beaver Deceiver. In fact, a 2006 survey found that trapping as a solution to beaver problems had a 79% failure rate within two years due to re-settlement by new beavers.

== Fishing ==
Beaver Lake is heavily fished by locals. Many trout are caught from shore, but it is best for any species with a boat. Trout are found mostly in the main and larger sister lake. Bass are caught consistently in Beaver's many lily pads and fallen timber areas, and are abundant in the smaller, shallower sister lake. Perch are found all over, and dropping a worm under a dock produces many of them.

== Beaver Lake ==
The other Beaver Lake in King County is at 47°15′42″N 122°00′7″W, Elevation: 699 feet (213 m)
