= Beaver Lake Park (Washington) =

Park in Sammamish, Washington, United States

Coordinates: 47°35′11″N 122°00′33″W

- Interactive map of Beaver Lake Park
- Type: Park (Fishing, Trails, Picnic Shelter, Off Leash Dog Park)
- Location: 25101 SE 24TH STREET, Sammamish, Washington
- Nearest city: Sammamish
- Operator: King County
- Open: 1985
- Status: Active

Beaver Lake Park is a 54-acre (220,000 m^{2}) park located on the southwest corner of Beaver Lake in the city of Sammamish, Washington. It offers public access to the lake, fishing areas, a picnic shelter, a baseball field, an off leash dog park, trails, play structures, barbecue grills, and the necessities. (e.g.bathrooms, parking, etc.)

The park is also home to a pavilion and the Lodge at Beaver Lake, which has traditional Native American totem poles and story poles carved by Tsimshian artist David A. Boxley, and hosts weddings, receptions, and dinners.

In October, the park is host to the annual "Nightmare at Beaver Lake," a haunted house-type attraction, which benefits charitable projects sponsored by the local Sammamish Rotary which is part of Rotary International Rotary Club.

The park has also hosted the Annual Beaver Lake Triathlon since 1994.

The park used to be owned and maintained by King County, but the park was transferred, effective January 1, 2003, to the City of Sammamish due to county budget shortfalls caused by state tax revolt.
