= Laughing Jacobs Creek =

Location
- Country: United States
- State: Washington
- County: King

Physical characteristics
- Source: Laughing Jacobs Lake
  - location: Sammamish, Washington
- Mouth: Lake Sammamish
  - location: Issaquah, Washington
- Length: 2.9 mi (4.7 km)
- Basin size: 3,600 acres (15 km^{2})

Basin features
- Tributaries
  - right: Many Springs Creek

Laughing Jacobs Creek is a stream in King County in Western Washington, United States. It originates from Laughing Jacobs Lake on the Sammamish Plateau and flows for 2.9 miles (4.7 km) through the cities of Sammamish and Issaquah, descending a waterfall before entering the southeastern portion of Lake Sammamish, which itself ultimately drains into Puget Sound. The watershed includes various wetlands, Beaver Lake, and its main tributary, Many Springs Creek. It hosts Coho salmon, Cutthroat trout, and Kokanee salmon, with the stretch of the creek downstream of its falls a primary spawning ground for Lake Sammamish's Kokanee. The lake and creek are reportedly named after an early settler who attempted to imitate a loon call.

== Course ==
Laughing Jacobs Creek flows for 2.9 miles (4.7 km) through portions of King County, Washington. The upper portion of the watershed lies within residential areas in the city of Sammamish. The stream originates from the 7.4-acre (3.0 ha) Laughing Jacobs Lake and flows southward. After leaving the residential area, it flows through a narrow ravine before entering the city of Issaquah, surrounded on both sides by evergreen forest, and receives Many Springs Creek as a tributary. It flows down a waterfall before running through a culvert pipe, about 6 feet (180 cm) in diameter, as it passes under East Lake Sammamish Parkway. It enters Lake Sammamish near Lake Sammamish State Park, about 0.5 miles (0.80 km) downstream from the falls. The Sammamish River flows from Lake Sammamish into the larger Lake Washington, which itself drains into the Puget Sound.

== Hydrology ==
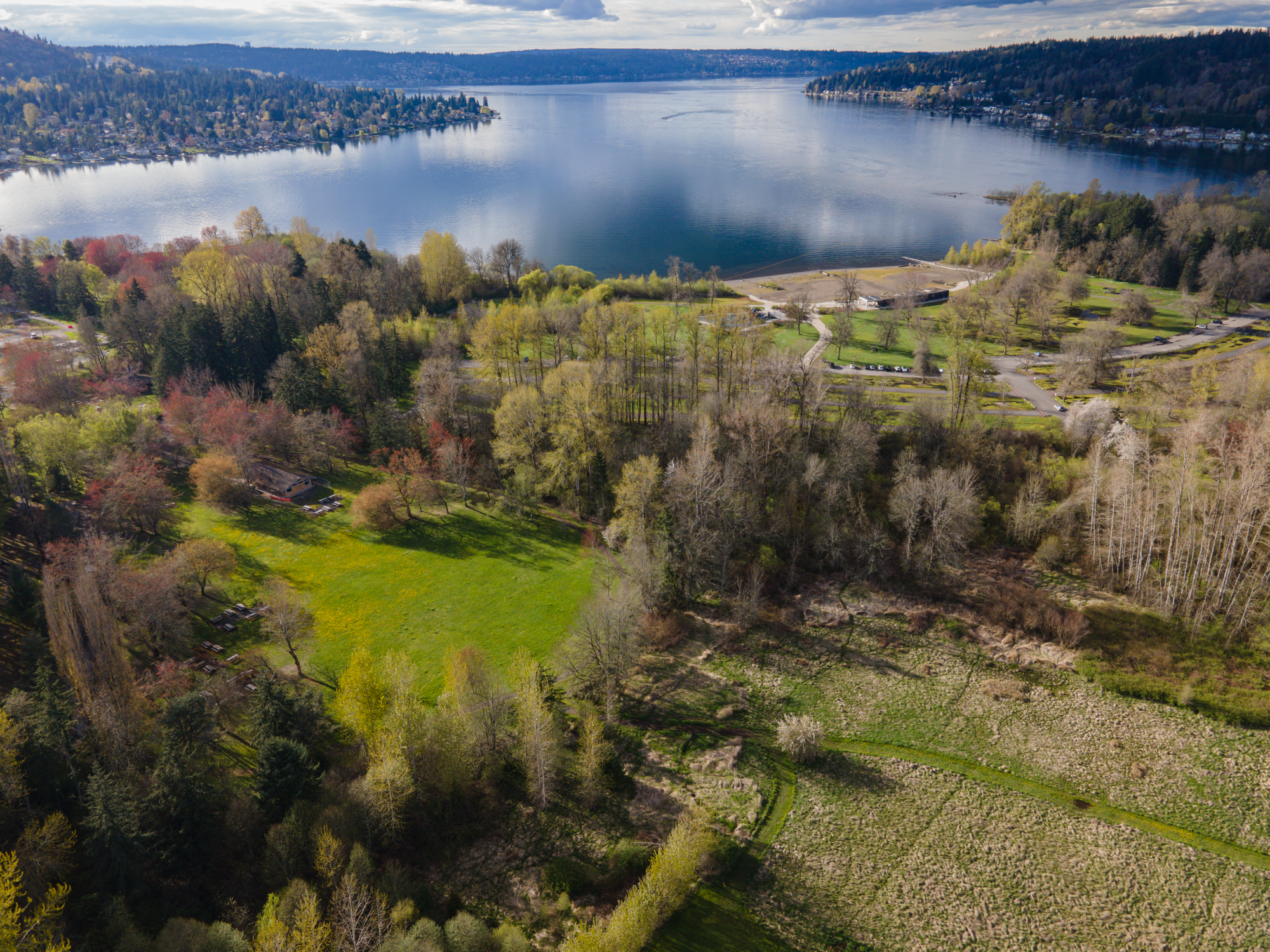
Overview of Lake Sammamish State Park. The creek enters the lake in the forested area at upper right.

Laughing Jacobs Creek has a drainage area of around 3,600 acres (15 km^{2}). The creek is one of several small creeks along Lake Sammamish's eastern shoreline. Alongside Laughing Jacobs Lake, the upper watershed of the creek on the Sammamish Plateau also contains Beaver Lake and various wetlands. These allow for a greater consistency in streamflow than the other small creeks in the region. Laughing Jacobs Lake and its eponymous creek was reportedly named after two early American settlers overheard a settler named Jacobs attempting to imitate a loon call at the lake. The lake was also historically known as Sutter Lake and Sutter Mill Lake.

Over an average 10 year period, Laughing Jacobs Creek has an estimated peak streamflow of 106 cu ft (3.0 m^{3}) per second, while a 100-year flood (the largest flood expected in an average 100 year period) would result in a total flow of 187 cu ft (5.3 m^{3}) per second. A 2018–2020 survey found the creek's water temperature to be the coolest during February and the warmest during August, with little variation between different stretches of the creek. Water temperatures recorded during this survey varied from 34.8 °F (1.6 °C) to 61.7 °F (16.5 °C).

Many Springs Creek is the main tributary stream to Laughing Jacobs Creek. A small perennial (continuously-flowing) stream much smaller than Laughing Jacobs, Many Springs forms less than 0.5 miles from the creeks' confluence, emerging from various clean groundwater springs. It has a shallow gradient (steepness), allowing for its use by spawning salmon. Many Springs has a peak 10 year streamflow of 25 cu ft (0.71 m^{3}) per second, while its 100 year peak is estimated at around 38 cu ft (1.1 m^{3}) per second.

== Geology ==
During the Vashon Glaciation, about 19,000 to 16,000 years ago, glacial ice receded in several stages from the highlands, forming a glacial lake at the southern end of what is now Lake Sammamish, depositing glacial sediment across the Laughing Jacobs watershed. The recession created a large alluvial fan composed of coarse sand, boulders, and cobbles, which now lies near the creek's mouth. Laughing Jacobs Creek contributes somewhat to the large sandy and silty delta at the southern extent of Lake Sammamish, although this is also formed by Tibbetts Creek and (primarily) the larger Issaquah Creek. Alongside the alluvial fan, the lower basin of the creek mainly consists of alluvium, composed of cobbles, pebbles, sand, and silt, alongside some wetland areas composed of peat and fine sediments.

== Biology ==
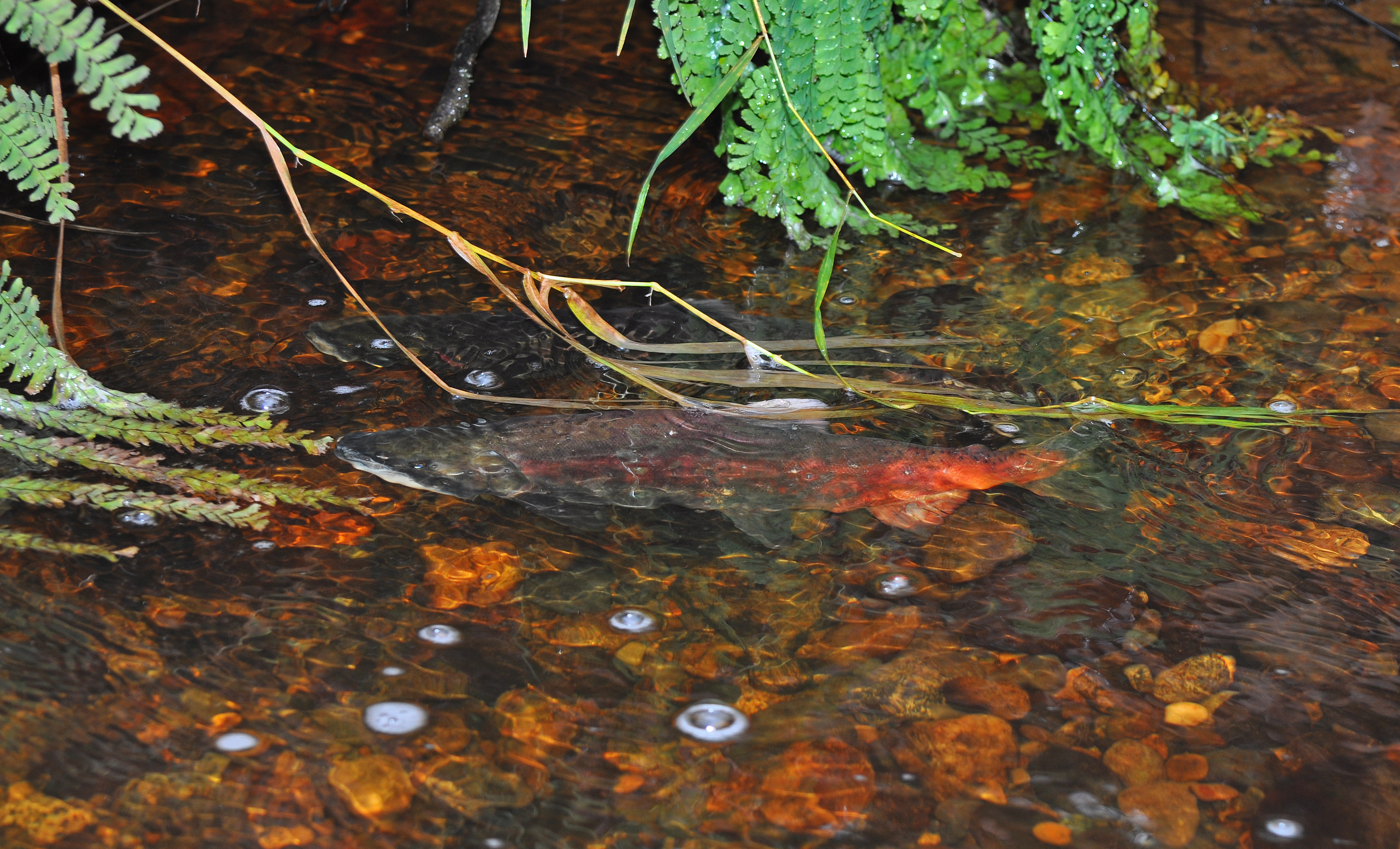
A Kokanee salmon swimming under ferns in Laughing Jacobs Creek, 2012

Laughing Jacobs is one of four primary streams used as spawning grounds by the lake's population of Kokanee salmon, who mainly spawn in the area upstream of the East Lake Sammamish Parkway. Laughing Jacobs Falls serves as a natural barrier, blocking the salmon from progressing further upstream. Both Cutthroat trout and Coho salmon are known to use the stream, with the latter restricted to the lower portions. A 2006 report noted the presence of the invasive Himalayan blackberry in thickets near the mouth of the creek.
