= James W. Clise House =

Historic house in Washington, United States

- U.S. National Register of Historic Places
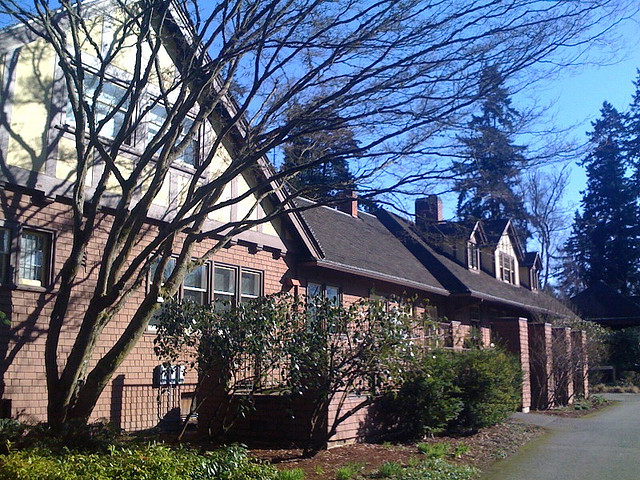
- James W. Clise House in 2010

- Location within Washington (state)
- Location: 6046 Lake Sammamish Pkwy., NE, Redmond, Washington
- Coordinates: 47°39′42″N 122°7′13″W
- Area: 1.5 acres (0.61 ha)
- Built: 1904
- NRHP reference No.: 73001874
- Added to NRHP: June 19, 1973

The James W. Clise House is a house built for and occupied by Seattle real estate pioneer James W. Clise (1855–1939) and his wife Anna Herr Clise (1866–1936). The house and 440-acre model dairy farm became Marymoor Park in Redmond, Washington, United States, and the house is listed on the National Register of Historic Places.

== History ==
The house was built in 1904 by Seattle businessman James W. Clise as a hunting lodge he named Willowmoor. He later decided to make it his family's primary residence. The house was added onto, with the original lodge becoming the south wing of the current larger building. Additions were completed in the 1920s which brought the house to 28 rooms; including ten bedrooms, seven bathrooms, two kitchens, two dining rooms, a game room, a family room, and a library.

The surrounding estate was enlarged as well, and by 1917 included more than 350 acres and nearly 30 buildings. Eventually the estate was renamed Marymoor after one of Clise's daughters.

In 1963, King County purchased the estate for use as a public park. The house and its immediate surroundings were added to the NRHP in 1973.

== See also ==
- National Register of Historic Places listings in King County, Washington
