= Pine Lake (Washington) =

Lake in King County, Washington, United States

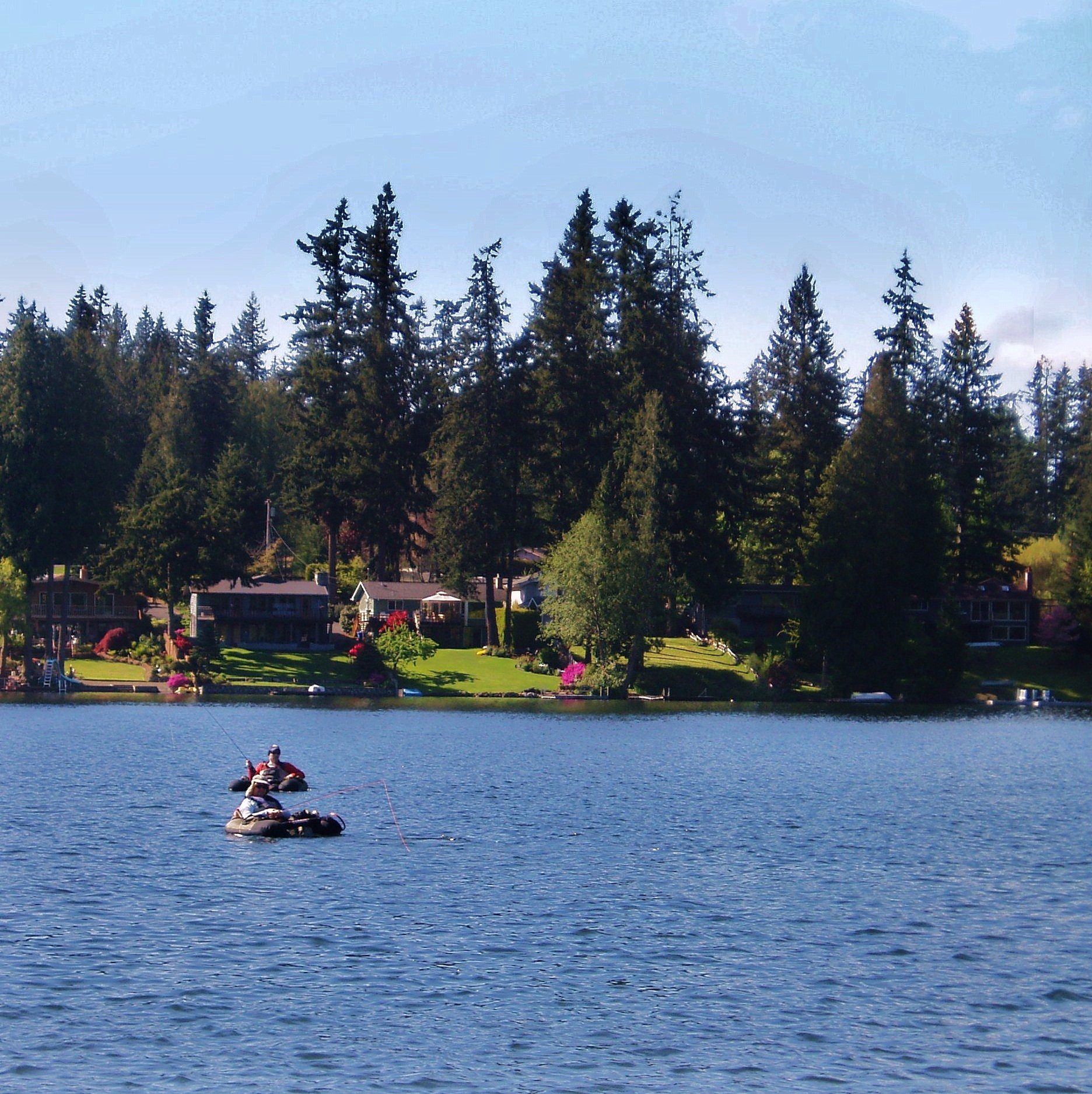

- Location within Washington (state) Location within the United States
- Location: Sammamish, King County, Washington, United States
- Coordinates: 47°35′15″N 122°02′39″W
- Primary outflows: Pine Lake Creek
- Basin countries: United States
- Surface elevation: 381 ft (116 m)

Pine Lake is a lake located in the city of Sammamish, Washington, about 20 miles (32 km) east of downtown Seattle. Surrounded by private homes and a city park, it is a popular recreation and fishing spot. It drains into Lake Sammamish via Pine Lake Creek.

== Pine Lake Park ==
Renovated in 2004, Pine Lake Park sits on the east shore of the lake and includes a swimming beach, boat launch (non-motorized only), picnic tables, play structures, basketball court, climbing walls, and a large baseball field. It draws large crowds, both children and adults, during nice weather and is used for outdoor community events such as Shakespeare in the Park and the city's Summer Nights in the Park music concert series, drawing thousands of local residents.

Pine Lake is a popular draw for suburban eastside anglers. The WDFW stocks both brown and rainbow trout directly from the gravel boat launch in early spring. Brown trout have been known to reach good sizes in Pine Lake – upwards of 18 inches (46 cm). It is possible to catch crayfish, bass, and perch from the dock as well.
