= Wilderness Rim, Washington =

- Census-designated place
- Location in Washington and the United States Wilderness Rim (the United States)
- Coordinates: 47°26′47″N 121°46′09″W
- Country: United States
- State: Washington
- County: King

Area
  - Total: 0.630 sq mi (1.63 km^{2})
  - Land: 0.622 sq mi (1.61 km^{2})
  - Water: 0.008 sq mi (0.021 km^{2})
- Elevation: 1,050 ft (320 m)

Population (2020)
  - Total: 1,617
  - Density: 2,447/sq mi (944.8/km^{2})
- Time zone: UTC-8 (Pacific (PST))
  - Summer (DST): UTC-7 (PDT)
- ZIP code: 98045
- Area code: 425
- GNIS feature ID: 2585052
- FIPS code: 53-78780

Wilderness Rim is a census-designated place (CDP) in King County, Washington, United States. As of the 2020 census, Wilderness Rim had a population of 1,617.

== Geography ==
Wilderness Rim is located in eastern King County 4 miles (6 km) south of the city of North Bend. The community sits at the foot of Rattlesnake Mountain, which rises to the west to an elevation of 3,500 feet (1,100 m).

According to the United States Census Bureau, the Wilderness Rim CDP had a total area of 0.630 square miles (1.63 km^{2}), of which 0.622 square miles (1.61 km^{2}) are land and 0.008 square miles (0.021 km^{2}), or 1.23%, are water.

== Demographics ==
Historical population
Census	Pop.	Note	%±
2010	1,523		—
2020	1,617		6.2%
U.S. Decennial Census; 2000 2010

Wilderness Rim first appeared as a census designated place in the 2010 U.S. census.

=== Racial and ethnic composition ===
Wilderness Rim CDP, Washington – Racial and ethnic composition Note: the US Census treats Hispanic/Latino as an ethnic category. This table excludes Latinos from the racial categories and assigns them to a separate category. Hispanics/Latinos may be of any race.
Race / Ethnicity (NH = Non-Hispanic)	Pop 2010	Pop 2020	% 2010	% 2020
White alone (NH)	1,412	1,316	92.71%	81.39%
Black or African American alone (NH)	9	9	0.59%	0.56%
Native American or Alaska Native alone (NH)	9	10	0.59%	0.62%
Asian alone (NH)	12	27	0.79%	1.67%
Native Hawaiian or Pacific Islander alone (NH)	0	1	0.00%	0.06%
Other race alone (NH)	4	5	0.26%	0.31%
Mixed race or Multiracial (NH)	26	144	1.71%	8.91%
Hispanic or Latino (any race)	51	105	3.35%	6.49%
Total	1,523	1,617	100.00%	100.00%

=== 2020 census ===
As of the 2020 census, Wilderness Rim had a population of 1,617. The median age was 39.1 years. 23.4% of residents were under the age of 18 and 9.6% of residents were 65 years of age or older. For every 100 females there were 103.1 males, and for every 100 females age 18 and over there were 101.6 males age 18 and over.

100.0% of residents lived in urban areas, while 0.0% lived in rural areas.

There were 595 households in Wilderness Rim, of which 30.1% had children under the age of 18 living in them. Of all households, 67.1% were married-couple households, 12.8% were households with a male householder and no spouse or partner present, and 12.6% were households with a female householder and no spouse or partner present. About 14.8% of all households were made up of individuals and 4.4% had someone living alone who was 65 years of age or older.

There were 604 housing units, of which 1.5% were vacant. The homeowner vacancy rate was 0.0% and the rental vacancy rate was 0.0%.

Racial composition as of the 2020 census
Race	Number	Percent
White	1,345	83.2%
Black or African American	11	0.7%
American Indian and Alaska Native	11	0.7%
Asian	27	1.7%
Native Hawaiian and Other Pacific Islander	1	0.1%
Some other race	40	2.5%
Two or more races	182	11.3%
