= David R. Boxley =

Alaskan Tsimshian artist and totem-pole carver

David Robert Boxley (born July 27, 1981), also known as D. Robert Boxley, is an Alaskan Tsimshian artist and totem-pole carver from the Tsimshian community of Metlakatla, Alaska. He is the son of the carver David A. Boxley, his mentor. His mother, Elizabeth, is non-Native, but was adopted into the Tsimshian Laxsgiik (Eagle clan).

His former Tsimshian name was Lapaaygm xsgyiik, which means "He Who Flies Like the Eagle" in the Tsimshian language.

In 1999 he, along with his brother, Zach, was adopted into the Laxgyibuu (Wolf Clan), House of T'ałm Ha'ax, by Doreen Nathan, his father's aunt. This was done to correct his Eagle clan affiliation since he had to have an opposite clan from his father, David A. Boxley. (Tsimshian Indians follow the matrilineal tradition of most Northwest Coast tribes.)

He was given the name Gyibaawm laxha, which means "Wolf of the Sky". This was to honor his new clan, but also to pay homage to his former clan, the Laxsgyiik (Eagle clan).

By the 1980s he was living with his parents and brother Zachary in Kingston, Washington.

Since 2000, he has carved twenty five totem poles with his father and on his own. His first solo totem pole was made in 2005.

== Sources ==
- Hoyt-Goldsmith, Diane (1990) Totem Pole. New York: Holiday House.
- Hoyt-Goldsmith, Diane (1997) Potlatch: A Tsimshian Celebration. New York: Holiday House.
