= Lake Sammamish =

Lake in King County, Washington, US

- sc̓ababš
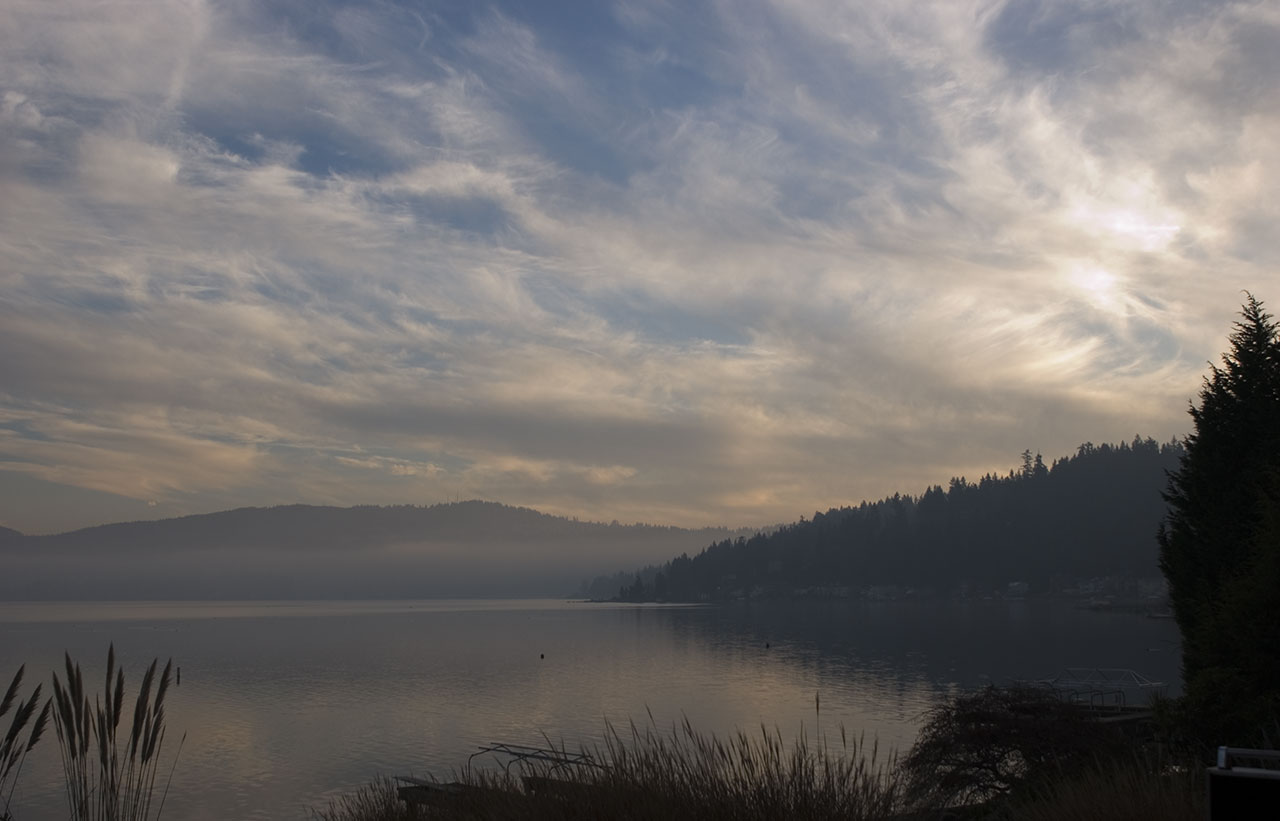
- A sunset over Lake Sammamish in mid-December.
- Location: King County, Washington
- Coordinates: 47°36′59″N 122°05′22″W
- Primary inflows: Issaquah Creek, Laughing Jacobs Creek, Pine Lake Creek
- Primary outflows: Sammamish River
- Catchment area: 98 sq mi (250 km^{2})
- Basin countries: United States
- Max. length: 7.3 mi (11.7 km)
- Max. width: 1.5 mi (2.4 km)
- Surface area: 4,897 acres (19.82 km^{2})
- Average depth: 58 ft (18 m)
- Max. depth: 105 ft (32 m)
- Surface elevation: 30 ft (9.1 m)

Lake Sammamish (Lushootseed: sc̓ababš) is a freshwater lake 8 miles (13 km) east of Seattle in King County, Washington, United States. The lake is 7 miles (11 km) long and 1.5 miles (2 km) wide, with a maximum depth of 105 feet (32 m) and a surface area of 8 sq mi (21 km^{2}). It lies east of Lake Washington and west of the Sammamish Plateau, and stretches from Issaquah in the south to Redmond in the north. At Issaquah it is fed by Issaquah Creek, and at Redmond it drains to Lake Washington via the Sammamish River, named after the native people who once lived along its entire length. The Sammamish People call this lake sc̓ababš (lit; little lake).

The 98 sq mi (250 km^{2}) Lake Sammamish watershed stretches from Redmond through Bellevue, and Issaquah to Preston and Hobart, and consists of numerous creeks which flow into the lake. Issaquah Creek is the largest tributary, furnishing over 70% of the lake's inflow.

== Development ==
The area surrounding Lake Sammamish has been, in recent times, the most rapidly growing suburban district in the Greater Seattle Metropolitan Area. During the late 1990s and early 2000s, the cities of Redmond, Snoqualmie, Fall City, Issaquah and Bellevue have grown substantially. The city of Sammamish was incorporated in 1999 because of suburban growth.

== Ecology and conservation ==
Historically, runoff from the heavy precipitation in the lake's watershed—nearly twice the 35 inches received annually by Seattle—was absorbed by the surrounding forests. Loose, sponge-like forest soils minimized runoff during winter storms and recharged groundwater aquifers, which in turn released fresh water to streams during the dry summer months. With rapid urbanization, however, much of the forest has been replaced by impervious surfaces such as roofs, roads, and parking lots, leading to increased stormwater runoff and flooding. This runoff carries sediment and toxic pollutants into streams and ultimately the lake, reducing water clarity and negatively affecting fish and wildlife.

In May 2010, the federal government asked the city of Sammamish to restrict development within 250 feet (76 m) of the lakeshore to protect local salmon and steelhead (Oncorhynchus mykiss) populations. The report did not list Lake Sammamish kokanee salmon (Oncorhynchus nerka) among the species at risk, although scientists and environmentalists warned that shoreline development and impacts on tributary creeks had pushed the kokanee to the brink of extirpation. Although the city of Sammamish resisted the recommendation, Issaquah already restricts development within 200 feet (61 m) of the lake, Issaquah Creek, and the East Fork of Issaquah Creek under its Shoreline Management Program. Estimates suggest that fewer than 100 kokanee salmon remain in Lake Sammamish.

=== Beavers ===
The recent return of beaver (Castor canadensis) to Lake Sammamish worries City of Issaquah and Lake Sammamish State Park officials who state that the mammals will cause flooding and burrow under roadways. These officials are recommending relocation of the beaver families. On July 6, 2010, officials of the City of Issaquah asked Washington Department of Fish and Wildlife to tear out a beaver dam on Tibbetts Creek in Lake Sammamish State Park because of concerns about potential flooding and barriers to salmon migration.

In contrast, research on watersheds in the Northern United States and Canada shows that beavers provide ecological benefits by creating ponds that increase fish and bird abundance and diversity. Research in the Stillaguamish River basin, approximately 50 miles (80 km) north of Lake Sammamish, found that extensive loss of beaver ponds resulted in an 89% reduction in coho salmon smolt summer production and an almost equally detrimental 86% reduction in critical winter habitat carrying capacity.

== Recreation and parks ==
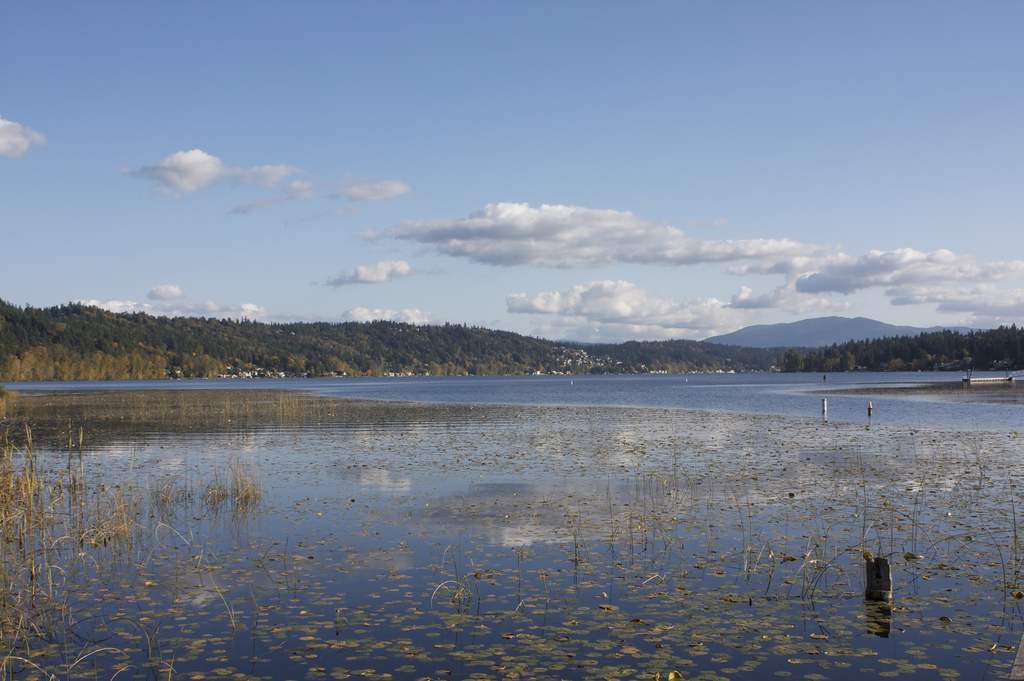
Lake Sammamish from Marymoor Park

Lake Sammamish is bordered by Marymoor Park at the lake's north end, Lake Sammamish State Park at its south end, and the East Lake Sammamish Trail. Lake Sammamish State Park provides nine public boat launches that can be accessed through a separate park entrance, for a fee, with parking and restroom facilities on site.

The public can access the lake's west shores at Redmond's Idylwood Park. The privately owned Vasa Park Resort, located in Bellevue, provides access from the west for a fee. Vasa Park offers one ramp for launching watercraft. Several housing developments own small, private parks that provide lake access for their residents.

The main leisure activities include rowing, fishing, waterskiing, wakeboarding, wakesurfing, tubing, and jet skiing.

There is a public slalom course for waterskiing at the far north end of the lake, running from the west to the east. In the mid-1980s, local radio personality Pat O'Day proposed that the Seafair Cup hydroplane races be moved to Lake Sammamish from Lake Washington, an effort that was unsuccessful.

Lake Sammamish offers fishing enthusiasts a variety of species to pursue, including perch, smallmouth bass, largemouth bass, cutthroat trout, salmon, and steelhead trout, among others.

== Events ==
- Serial killer Ted Bundy abducted two women in broad daylight from the beach at Lake Sammamish State Park on July 14, 1974, by faking an injury and asking for their help.
- Wife killer Randy Roth drowned his fourth wife Cynthia at Lake Sammamish in 1991 after taking off in a raft from Redmond's Idylwood Park.
