= David A. Boxley =

American artist

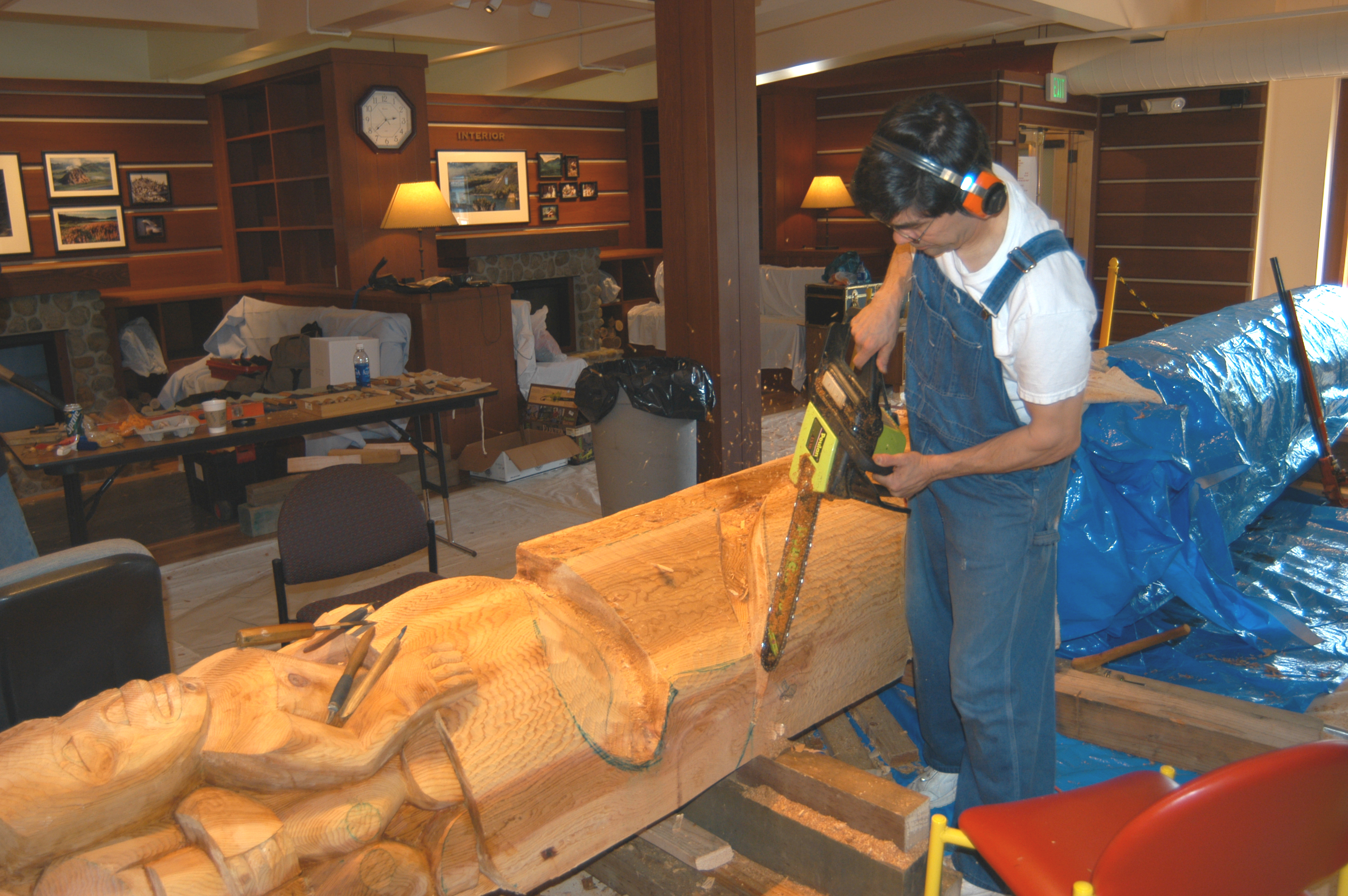
- David Boxley carving a totem pole
- Born: 1952 (age 73–74); Ketchikan, Alaska
- Education: Seattle Pacific University
- Known for: Totem Poles, Tsimshian carvings
- Children: David R. Boxley
- Website: http://www.davidboxley.com

David A. Boxley (born 1952) is an American artist from the Tsimshian tribe in Alaska, most known for his prolific creation of Totem Poles and other Tsimshian artworks.

Boxley was raised in Metlakatla, Alaska, home to many Tsimshian people. His works, done in traditional Tsimshian style and technique, have had international reach, and he is known as one of the most prolific contemporary makers of Totem Poles in the world. He has created over 70 poles, which have been displayed in notable places like Disney World, Florida and the Smithsonian National Museum of the American Indian, where it is permanently displayed. His other carvings are in the collections of various museums, and owned by royal families and nobles across Europe and Asia.

He has also played a part in reviving Tsimshian culture, creating Tsimshian dance groups, reviving the traditional ceremony called Potlatch, and passing on knowledge of Tsimshian language.

Boxley currently lives in Lynnwood, Washington, and his sons, particularly David R. Boxley, are also successful artists and carvers.

He is a member of the Laxsgiik (Eagle clan), and his four Tsimshian names include one meaning "First to Potlatch" and one meaning "He Who Works with the Cedar."

In 2023, the artist co-authored a book about his life and work, Tsimshian Eagle.

== Early life ==
Boxley was born in Ketchikan, Revillagigedo Island, Alaska, in 1952, but grew up in Metlakatla, Alaska. He was mostly raised by his grandparents, and would spend most of his time with them as a child. Due to nearly a century of cultural oppression in Alaska towards the Tsimshian, traditional Tsimshian culture was nearly extinct in Metlakatla, and in the region as a whole, while Boxley was growing up.

Unlike most children around him, Boxley was surrounded by traditional Tsimshian culture in his childhood. This was on account of his grandparents, who both spoke the Tsimshian language and knew many traditions of the past. He first learned to carve from his Grandfather, who he often describes as his “hero”. He described his grandfather as a man who “could build anything” and would pass on knowledge to Boxley, such as what wood should be used to carve, and how to create his own tools. His first works were those he helped carve with his grandfather growing up, and he still currently uses an adze made with the help of his grandfather in every carving project. Apart from this, Boxley claims he had been interested in being an artist “since third grade”.

After High School, Boxley attended Seattle Pacific University, and graduated with a Bachelor of Science degree in 1974. He then spent ten years working as a High School teacher and basketball coach in Seattle, Metlakatla and Washington. During this time, he began to seriously research the traditional art and culture of the Tsimshian. He studied the works of previous Tsimshian artists, and artists of other Pacific Northwest Coast artists such as the Haida and Tlingit. He also studied the works that the ancestors of these tribes left behind. Boxley also used libraries, art classes, museums, heritage sites and others, as well as taking some classes from a prominent Tsimshian artist at the time- Jack Hudson. However, Boxley mostly taught himself from his own research, and learned many traditional art styles and methods that had been lost to time. This soon overtook his teaching, and Boxley eventually decided to become a full time artist and carver in the mid-1980s.

== Career and works ==
=== Early Work (mid-1980s – 1990s) ===
Since the mid-1980s, Boxley has worked on many commissions. One of his first major ones was for the ‘Talking Stick’ for the 1990 Goodwill Games. Boxley designed the crown of the stick, and made it a symbolic symbol of peace between the United States and then Soviet Union, depicting the American eagle and the Russian bear together. The stick even had messages by the countries respective leaders at the time- President George H.W. Bush. and President Mikhail Gorbachev- engraved in it. It was a significant work that had a global audience, with the stick being carried across states similar to the Olympic Torch. Since this period, his reputation has grown as an elite carver and he has garnered an international reach.

=== Totem Poles (1980s–present) ===
Boxley is best known for his Totem Poles, which have been displayed across the U.S., Canada and Europe. They have been displayed in various notable areas.

==== Walt Disney World ====
Three of Boxley's poles stand at the Canada Pavilion in Epcot Center in Walt Disney World, Florida. He was asked to create a new totem pole for the center in 1998, alongside the two fiberglass ones that already stood in the center. This was done in an effort to give the Center greater authenticity, as the theme park was taking multiple initiatives to be more authentic. Then, in 2017, Disney commissioned Boxley to create two more poles to replace the fiberglass ones. These poles have since been lauded for their attempts at authenticity, but to some culture critics make the claim that putting the poles into a tourist setting might result in them losing their cultural significance.

==== National Museum of the American Indian ====
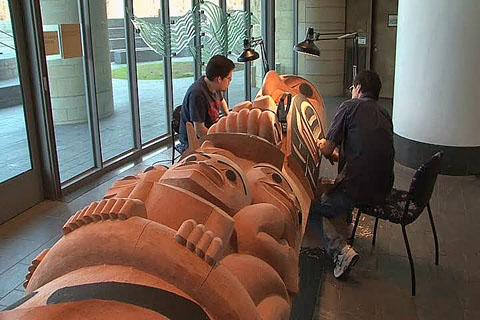
David Boxley and his son, David R. working on a Totem Pole in the National Museum of the American Indian

Another of Boxley's poles is currently in the Smithsonian National Museum of the American Indian in Washington D.C, where it is permanently displayed. This is significant as the Museum usually rotates their exhibitions and keeps only popular or iconic artworks on permanent display. It was Boxley's 70th pole, made out of a 500 year old cedar tree, and he was helped to carve it by his son David. The Museum is coveted by Native American artists, and a spot in the museum is very sought after. Boxley is very proud to have a pole in the museum, and was especially glad that the Tsimshian tribe and his village of Metlakatla were broadcast to a national and global audience due to the pole being raised. He is the second contemporary Totem Pole carver in the world to have a pole in the Museum, after Nathan Jackson.

==== Metlakatla and the U.S ====
In addition to having poles stand internationally, he has carved most of the poles in his native village of Metlakatla. In 1982, he made the town's first raised pole, and has since made others, alongside carver Wayne Hewson. Together, they have made 11 out of Metlakatla's 13 totem poles. Most of his poles stand across the U.S. and Canada. Many of these hold personal meaning, such as the one that stands outside Northwest Hospital in Seattle, dedicated to his deceased sister-in-law. Another is one of three poles in Metlakatla that stand next to each other. Boxley made the largest one, which stands 30 ft tall, in honour of his grandfather.

=== Other works (1980s–present) ===
In addition to Totem Poles, Boxley has made many other items, such as bentwood boxes, masks, rattles, prints, panels and paintings. Many of these works are in the collections of galleries, museums and art auctions across the United States and Europe. He has formed a strong relationship with Quintana Galleries in Portland, Oregon, where his work has become a permanent fixture. Many of the items are also in the collection of various world leaders, such as in Germany, the King of Sweden, and the Emperor of Japan.

=== Passing on Knowledge (2000s–present) ===
Boxley continues to carve today, and in recent years has dedicated efforts to training and teaching younger generations of Tsimshian people his knowledge and techniques. His sons, David and Zachery, have notably followed their father's line of work and are both successful carvers in their own right. David R. Boxley in particular has garnered his own reputation as a talented carver, and has started making Totem Poles himself. Boxley now works with his sons, stepson and nephew on most of his works. Boxley mentored S'Klallam artist Jeffrey Veregge for a time in 2001. In 2019, Boxley formally took on an apprentice, Dylan Sanidad, through The Washington State Arts Apprenticeship Program, whom he will teach traditional Tsimshian carving.

== Art style and techniques ==
Boxley's works are done in a very traditional manner and he focuses on a uniquely Tsimshian art style. Boxley originally borrowed heavily from different Pacific North West Coast styles, such as Haida and Tlingit, but in the mid-1980s, his style began to look more explicitly Tsimshian. He has described his style as “Alaskan Tsimshian”- specific to the Alaskan branch of the Tsimshian. For his Totem Poles, he uses old red cedar trees, as they are the trees that his Tsimshian ancestors were surrounded by. However, he has given up some traditional materials for modern ones. An example is using latex paint instead of traditional Tsimshian pigments, such as copper oxide and charcoal mixed with salmon eggs and urine. Despite this, Boxley stresses the importance of keeping everything as traditional and authentic as possible.

== Revival of Tsimshian culture ==
Since the 1980s, Boxley has also contributed to the revival of Tsimshian culture as a whole, and his work in this regard has been praised by Tsimshian communities. As a result of his efforts, he was given the title of “culture bearer” by his Tsimshian tribe. He has stated that this title is the greatest honour he has received. His work has also been praised by others outside of the Tsimshian community. Quintana Galleries in Portland said of Boxley: “Not all of the artists [in the museum] were reviving a culture, but he was”. Similarly, the director of the National Museum of the American Indian, Kevin Gover, stated: “David Boxley has been instrumental in revitalizing the cultural traditions of carving, song, and dance in his Tsimshian community”.

One of Boxley's revival efforts was restarting the “Potlatch”, a traditional ceremony practiced by Indigenous groups in the Pacific North West Coast of the U.S. and Canada. In 1982, Boxley lead the first Potlatch in Metlakatla in over a century, also making songs and dances for the event as well as raising a Totem Pole he made. He has since lead other Potlatches across the Pacific Northwest.

Another of Boxley's contributions is the starting and leading of traditional Tsimshian dance groups. The most notable of these is the “Git-Hoan”, meaning “People of the Salmon”, currently led by Boxley's son David. The group has performed across the United States, Canada and Europe, to wide success and acclaim. The Git-Hoan combines traditional Tsimshian song, language and dance, along with masks, costumes and instruments made by Boxley. Boxley is also concerned with authenticity in the Git-Hoan performances, having researched song style, dances, costumes and ornaments using primary material such as a 1913 silent film and a wax audio reel. All of these authentic traditions are therefore showcased to an international audience. The Git Hoan dancers did multiple performances at the Disney Epcot Center, as part of the dedication ceremony for the two poles he raised there in 2017. These performances have been praised for bringing authenticity to the park and showcasing true Native American culture to audiences. It has been one of the few genuine Native American performances at the park since its creation.

Boxley is also concerned with the preservation of the Tsimshian language, which has only approximately 70 speakers left in Alaska. He has also played a role regarding this; with he and his son David being involved in Tsimshian language classes. In addition to this, both Boxleys write songs for their Git-Hoan dance group using the traditional Tsimsian language. They consciously do this to expose people to the language.

Due to his efforts, Metlakatla has had a strong revival in traditional culture, and younger generations of the Tsimshian tribe have had the chance to be surrounded by traditional Tsimshian culture.

== Sources ==
- Hoyt-Goldsmith, Diane (1990) Totem Pole. New York: Holiday House.
- Hoyt-Goldsmith, Diane (1997) Potlatch: A Tsimshian Celebration. New York: Holiday House.
- Boxley, David A. with Steve Quinn (2023) Tsimshian Eagle: A Culture Bearer's Journey. Seattle: Chin Music Press.
