= Marymoor Park =

Park in King County, Washington, USA

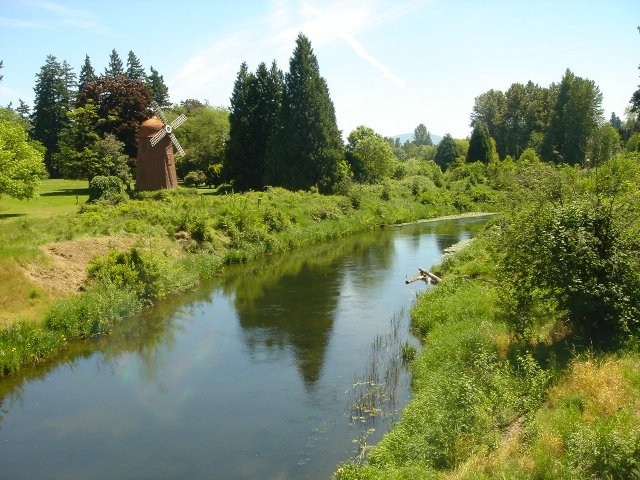
- Interactive map of Marymoor Park
- Location: Redmond, Washington
- Coordinates: 47°39′33.05″N 122°6′33.52″W
- Area: 640 acres (2.6 km^{2})
- Created: 1962
- Visitors: 3,000,000
- Website: King County Parks

Marymoor Park, located on the north end of Lake Sammamish in Redmond, Washington, is King County's largest, oldest, and most popular park, with more than 3 million annual visitors coming to roam its 640 acres (2.6 km^{2}). Among recreational activities available are various sports facilities, rock climbing, a 40-acre off-leash dog park and a velodrome. It is also one end of the Sammamish River Trail, a biking and walking trail. In addition, a radio control aircraft flying field and a pet memorial garden are within the park's boundaries.

The historic Willowmoor farm and Clise Mansion lie at the western edge of the park, along the Sammamish River. The farm and mansion were created in the early 1900s by James Clise, a banker. The landscaping was designed by the Olmsted Brothers. The mansion is on the National Register of Historic Places.

Ralph Dodd and two of his brothers, Dean & Lloyd Dodd were partners with Walter Nettleton in operating a large dairy farm at Willowmoor farm from 1930 until 1964. The brothers renamed the farm Marymoor in honor of Walter's young daughter, Mary Nettleton, who died in a bicycle accident. Although all 6 of Ralph Dodd's brothers were happily married, Ralph remained single. Ralph considered the children of Bellevue's Kemper Freeman to be his family, having lived at Marymoor when the Freemans resided there.

The park is home to a summer concert series known as Concerts at Marymoor, produced by AEG Live, which invites popular artists every year. The park also hosts movies at Marymoor every summer.

At the western end of the park, 2.1 acres are used by the Marymoor Community Gardener's Association, one of the oldest public gardens in the country.

In February 2003, King County added a one dollar parking fee to offset budget reductions.

Marymoor has a 40-acre off-leash dog area, where dogs can play in fields or swim in the Sammamish Slough.

== Proposed cricket stadium ==
Early rendering for the cricket facility

In February 2022, the King County Council passed a "motion of support" for the development of a cricket facility on 20 acres (8.1 ha) of land at Marymoor Park. The cricket ground was named as a potential venue for Major League Cricket, the United States national team, and the 2024 ICC Men's T20 World Cup. Construction was expected to begin in early 2023, but discussions remained "ongoing" by 2024.
