= Sammamish River =

River in Washington, United States

Sammamish River Sammamish Slough, Squak Slough
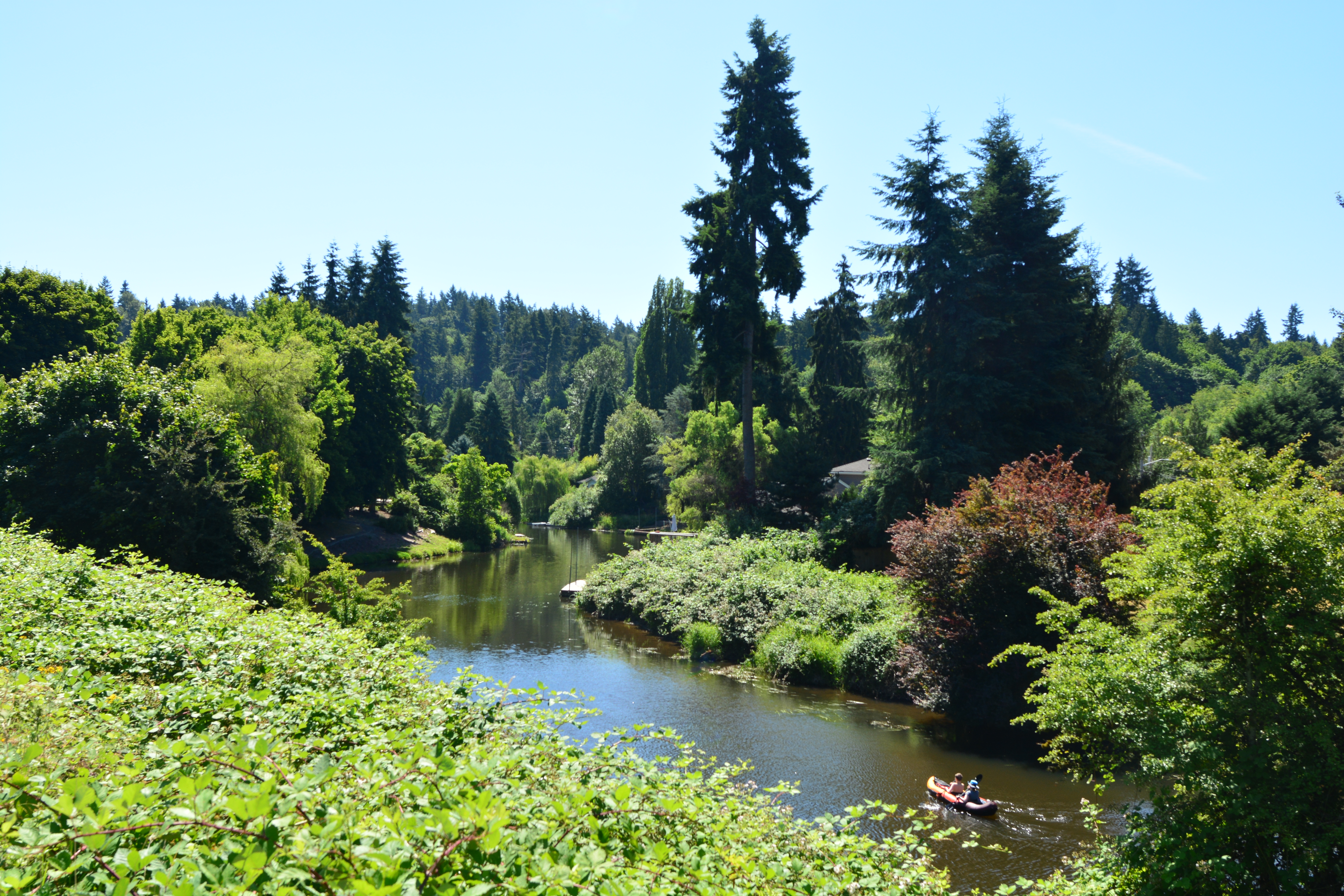
- Sammamish River in Bothell

Location
- Country: United States
- State: Washington
- County: King

Physical characteristics
- Source: Lake Sammamish
  - location: Redmond, Washington
  - coordinates: 47°39′09″N 122°06′24″W
  - elevation: 29 ft (8.8 m)
- Mouth: Lake Washington
  - location: Kenmore, Washington
  - coordinates: 47°45′12″N 122°15′30″W
  - elevation: 17 ft (5.2 m)
- Length: 13.7 mi (22.0 km)
- Basin size: 241 sq mi (620 km^{2})
- Discharge
  - average: 311 cu ft (8.8 m^{3})

The Sammamish River runs for about 13.7 miles (22.0 km) through portions of King County, Washington, United States, draining Lake Sammamish into Lake Washington. It flows out of Lake Sammamish at Marymoor Park in Redmond before continuing through suburban residential areas in Redmond, Woodinville, Bothell, and Kenmore. About 32% of the riparian habitat (riverside buffer area) is forested. The river hosts a diverse range of fish, such as sculpins and smelts, as well as various migratory salmonids. It has four major tributary streams: Bear Creek, North Creek, Swamp Creek, and Little Bear Creek. The floodplain was carved out by a glacial meltwater channel during the Vashon Glaciation, about 15,000 years ago, resulting in a geology dominated by glacial deposits and alluvium.

The Marymoor Archaeological Site is located near the river's mouth, estimated to be around 2,400 to 8,000 years old. At the time of Euro-American contact, the area was inhabited by the Sammamish people, a division of the broader Duwamish, a Coast Salish nation. European settlement of the valley began during the 1870s, and loggers cleared its forests over the following decades. The river was subject to heavy modifications and flood control measures. The opening of the Lake Washington Ship Canal in 1917 caused the level of Lake Washington to drop, and a local drainage district attempted to alleviate floods by constructing drainage ditches and straightening its upper course. The U.S. Army Corps of Engineers oversaw measures to channelize and dredge the river during the 1960s, expanding a weir near the river's source. Redmond entered a period of extensive growth and urbanization in the late 20th century, while riparian habitat restoration efforts were taken across the river's course during the 2010s.

== Course ==
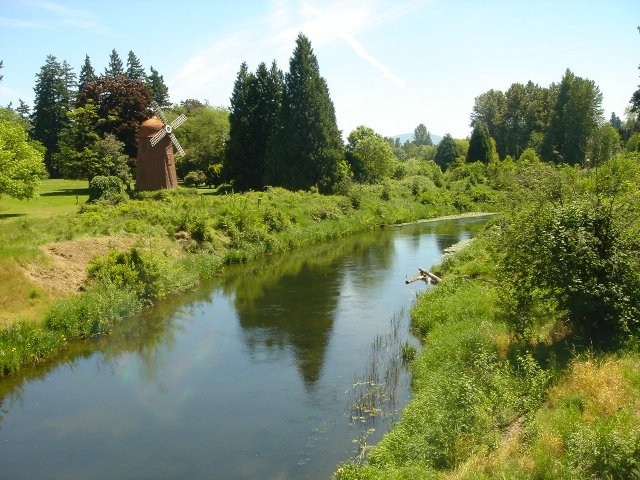
The Sammamish River near its source in Marymoor Park

The Sammamish River runs for about 13.7 miles (22.0 km) through Western Washington, draining Lake Sammamish into Lake Washington. (Note: The length of the river can vary depending on how its start and end points are calculated. The 13.7-mile figure reflects the length between the western tip of the island at the river's mouth to a point 3,000 feet (910 m) upstream from the flood control weir.) It emerges from Lake Sammamish at Marymoor Park in Redmond, flowing northwest through the park and alongside a residential area. It receives two small, unnamed tributary streams before turning north, crossing a highway overpass for State Route 520, and receiving Bear Creek (also known as Big Bear Creek) as a major tributary on its right bank. For about 1.5 miles (2.4 km) downstream of the confluence, it flows north through a suburban residential and commercial area of Redmond, passing a golf course. The Sammamish River Trail runs along the river between Marymoor Park and the city of Bothell.

After this, the Sammamish exits the city limits of Redmond and flows north through land mainly used for agriculture and recreation. It then flows northwest through developed residential areas in Woodinville and Bothell, a region featuring the greatest amount of wetland in the river corridor. It receives two major tributaries on its right bank as it turns west through Bothell: Little Bear Creek, followed by North Creek about 1 mile (1.6 km) downstream after crossing under a major Interstate 405 interchange. It flows west through several wetlands in downtown Bothell, briefly turning south within the city before curving back towards the west.

In the last mile of its course, the Sammamish flows west through residential areas as it exits Bothell and enters Kenmore. It receives Swamp Creek as a tributary from the north about 1 mile (1.6 km) from its mouth. The area around the Sammamish's outflow into Lake Washington is dominated by wetland, with a former industrial site to the north and a river island situated at the mouth. Lake Washington currently drains into Puget Sound through the Lake Washington Ship Canal. Prior to the canal's construction in 1917, the lake instead drained south through the Black River into the Duwamish River, which flowed north and emptied into the sound.

== Hydrology ==
Most of the Sammamish watershed lies within King County, Washington, although a small portion is within Snohomish County to the north. The watershed primarily consists of suburban areas, although it contains portions of urban centers such as Bellevue, Kirkland, and Redmond, as well as relatively large undeveloped areas.

The Sammamish River's four largest tributaries, from largest to smallest in terms of drainage area, are Bear Creek, North Creek, Swamp Creek, and Little Bear Creek. The only other comparable tributary to these is Gold Creek, which the river receives alongside a number of much smaller tributaries. The Sammamish receives most of its streamflow from surface water such as these tributaries, although some groundwater drains into the river from aquifers.

Major Sammamish River tributary streams
Name	Drainage area	Length	Percentage of total streamflow	Confluence RM. (Note: Number of miles upstream from the Sammamish's mouth that the rivers converge)
Bear Creek	48.4 sq mi (125 km^{2})	12.4 miles (20.0 km)	19%	12.3 mi (19.8 km)
Little Bear Creek	15.6 sq mi (40 km^{2})	7.7 miles (12.4 km)	6%	5.4 mi (8.7 km)
North Creek	28.5 sq mi (74 km^{2})	12.6 miles (20.3 km)	14%	4.4 mi (7.1 km)
Swamp Creek	22.8 sq mi (59 km^{2})	10.9 miles (17.5 km)	9%	0.75 mi (1.21 km)
Sammamish River	241 sq mi (620 km^{2}) (Note: Including the 101 square miles (260 km^{2}) drainage basin of Lake Sammamish.)	13.8 mi (22.2 km)	—N/a	—N/a

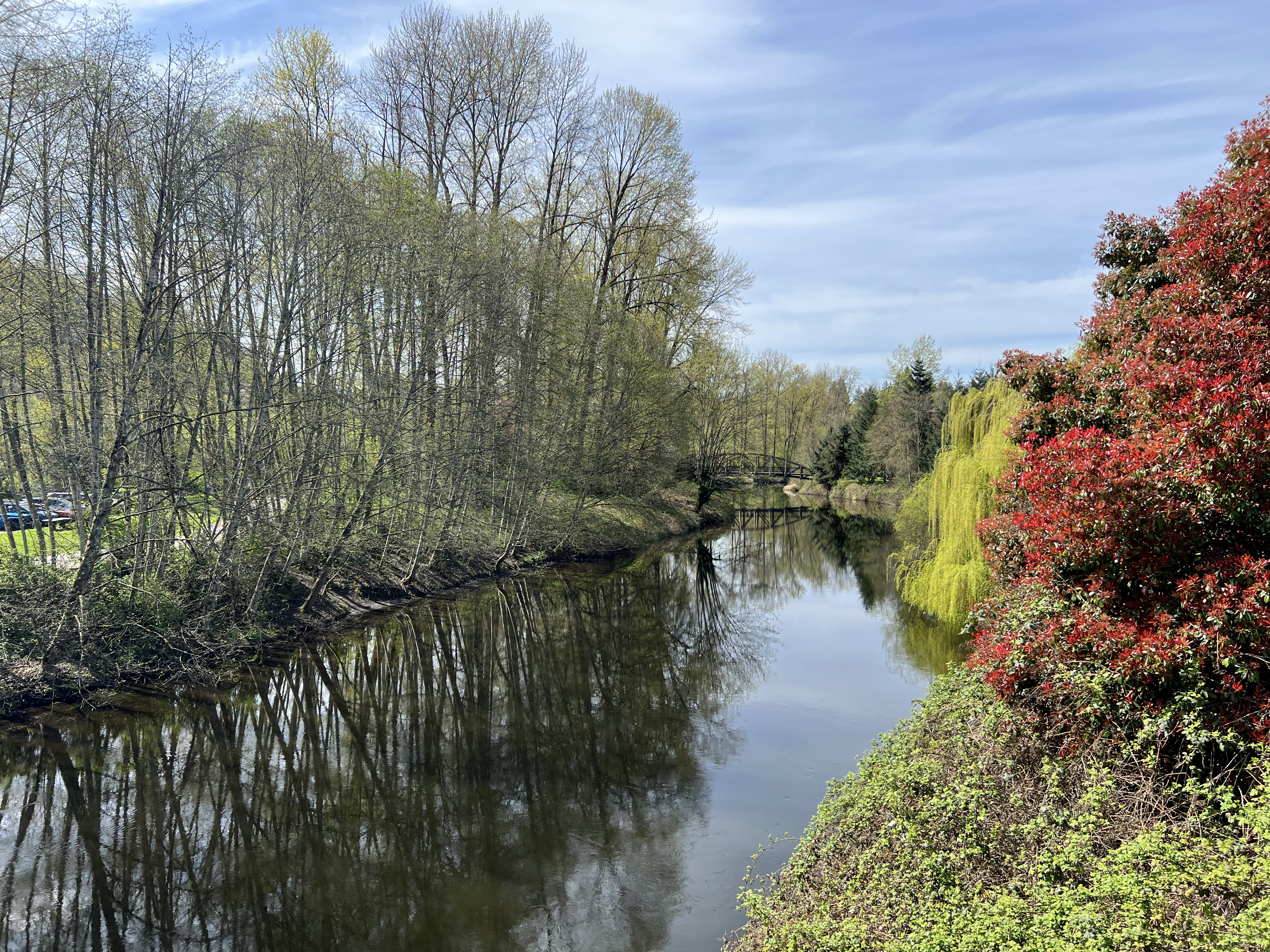
The Sammamish River in Bothell, overlooking the Bothell Landing Bridge

The Sammamish River has a low elevation and gentle steepness. Its source is at about 29 feet (8.8 m) above sea level, while its mouth is at about 17 feet (5.2 m), resulting in an average descent of about 0.9 feet per mile (0.16 m/km). The river's floodplain varies from almost 1 mile (1.6 km) in width in the upper two-thirds of its course, to a minimum of 1,000 feet (0.30 km) near Bothell.

The Sammamish is the second-largest tributary to Lake Washington, behind the Cedar River, and provides about 40% of the lake's water. Backflow from the lake impacts the lower 2.6 miles (4.2 km) of the Sammamish's course.

=== Streamflow and water quality ===
Between 1965 and 2000, the Sammamish had an average flow of 311 cu ft (8.8 m^{3}) per second, measured from a station in Woodinville. The river reaches its lowest flows in August, with an average annual low of around 70 cu ft (2.0 m^{3}) per second. The 100-year flood and 100-year drought (the maximum and minimum flows expected in a 100-year period) for the river are over 4,000 cu ft (110 m^{3}) and around 10 cu ft (0.28 m^{3}) per second.

A sampling study of groundwater in the Sammamish Valley between 2002 and 2020 found arsenic and sodium levels to exceed the maximum allowed by state drinking water safety standards. Levels of elements serving as secondary indicators, such as iron, manganese and aluminum were also found to exceed safety standards. The groundwater was found to have much higher levels of metals and organic carbon than the river's water, but substantially less dissolved oxygen. Average groundwater temperatures were also much lower than those of the river, ranging between 49.8 to 61.7 °F (9.9 to 16.5 °C).

== Geology ==
At least four major glaciations occurred in the Puget Sound region during the Pleistocene, of which the Vashon Glaciation was the most recent. Beginning about 15,000 BCE, the Vashon Glaciation saw the Puget Lobe of the Cordilleran ice sheet advance south and cover much of the region around Puget Sound, before it retreated around 13,000 BCE. The advance and retreat of the glacier deposited sediments such as glacial till (dense, silty sand) and glaciolacustrine deposits (a mix of silt and clay), with deposit layers thicker than 1,500 feet (460 m) in some areas. A major meltwater channel formed what is now Lake Sammamish and the Sammamish River valley. This broad and shallow channel allowed the nascent Sammamish River to spread fine-grained alluvium (river-deposited sediment) across a broad floodplain, creating meanders and oxbow lakes. These alluvial deposits mainly consist of silt, sand, and gravel, with small amounts of clay.

== Biology ==
Chinook salmon are among the several species of salmonid which traverse the Sammamish.

As it connects Lake Washington and Lake Sammamish, the Sammamish River is used by a greater variety of fish species than many other streams in western Washington. The Sammamish allows Chinook and Coho salmon from the Issaquah Creek system and the Issaquah Salmon Hatchery to access Lake Washington. Many Chinook salmon return to the Sammamish to spawn in its tributary streams. Other salmonids present in the river include Sockeye salmon, Kokanee salmon, and cutthroat trout. Small numbers of steelhead trout have been observed in the Sammamish's tributaries.

Other fish known to be present in the watershed include various sculpin species, longfin smelt, northern pikeminnow, peamouth chub, three-spined stickleback, largescale sucker, longnose dace, and brook lamprey. Non-native species such as yellow perch, largemouth bass, and brown bullhead are known to be present; predation by these introduced species may pose a risk to salmon fry.

The river has a limited diversity of benthic (river bottom) invertebrates. Fly larvae (especially chironomids) and oligochate worms are by far the most common invertebrates found in the river, alongside variable quantities of mayfly nymphs. The dominance of fly larvae in the river may serve as an indication of environmental stress. Fingernail clams are also frequently found across the Sammamish, but especially on its lower course, while mites, ramshorn snails, ostracods, amphipods and various insect larvae are more common upstream. Other common invertebrate species noted in surveys include Asiatic clams, bladder snails, nematodes, and the leech Helobdella stagnalis.

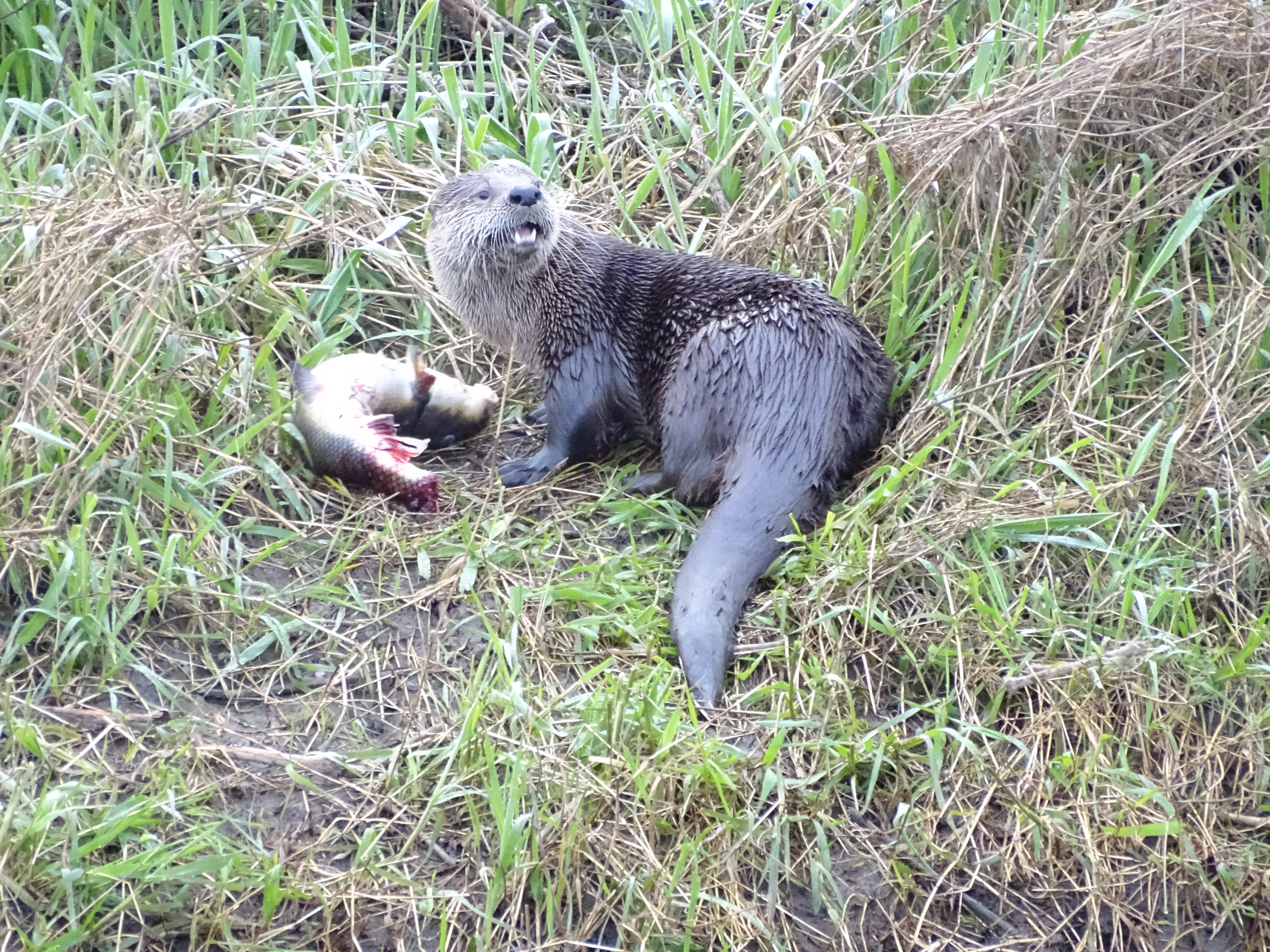
A North American river otter and its caught salmon by the Sammamish River Trail

The removal of the old-growth forests and wetlands around the Sammamish has pushed out many of the species which historically used the watershed. As of 2021, about 32% of the Sammamish River's riparian habitat is forested, totaling 220.5 acres (0.892 km^{2}). These forests improve water quality and provide greater food resources to fish such as salmon. Willows are the most common trees near the beginning and end of the Sammamish's course, while Populus trichocarpa (cottonwood) makes up much of the tree foliage around the river in Bothell. Conifers make up only a small portion of the trees in the riparian forests. Common invasive plants in the riparian zone include Rubus armeniacus (Himalayan blackberry) and Phalaris arundinacea (reed canarygrass), which was originally introduced as an anti-erosion measure.

Mammals adapted to human-modified environments such as deer, river otter, beavers, opossums, and coyotes are known to reside in the watershed. The wetland and riparian forest habitats along the river have traditionally served as habitats for migratory birds. Birds such as red-tailed hawks, great blue herons, and harlequin ducks can be found in the area.

== History ==
Prior to human modification, the river was slow-moving and meandering, forming a large floodplain. The river had an estimated length of around 30 miles (48 km), more than twice its current length, and regularly overflowed its banks. The river valley was densely forested, dominated by western redcedar, hemlock, and Douglas fir trees, with willows and deciduous vegetation most common directly along the riverbanks. Early Euro-American settlers reported plants such as Malus fusca (wild crab-apple), Corylus cornuta (beaked hazelnut), Urtica dioica (nettle), and Typha latifolia (cattail) around the river. About half of Lake Washington's salmon and trout populations traveled through the river to spawn.

The Marymoor Archaeological Site, among the most influential archaeological sites in the Puget Sound region, is located on the Sammamish floodplain near its source. Dating estimates for the site range from 2,400 to over 8,000 years before present. At the time of Euro-American contact in the early 1800s, the Sammamish basin was inhabited by the Sammamish people, an autonomous division of the broader Duwamish people. They were closely connected to other nearby Coast Salish nations, and spoke a similar dialect of Lushootseed to the rest of the Duwamish. The village of ƛ̕ax̌ʷadis ('a place where something grows') was located near the mouth of the river on Lake Washington.

=== After colonization ===
Early Euro-Americans in the region dubbed the Sammamish people the "Squak" tribe. Due to this, the Sammamish River was originally referred to as the Squak Slough. The Sammamish river valley was among the territories ceded to American control under the 1855 Treaty of Point Elliott, in exchange for federal recognition of hunting and fishing rights. The treaty rights for the Sammamish area are currently held by the Muckleshoot Tribe.

The Sammamish valley was first surveyed for Euro-American settlement in 1870. The clearing of forests for homesteading over the following decade triggered a logging boom in the area. The river was used as a means to transport logs to Kenmore and across Lake Washington. Heavy logging continued until the early 20th century, with a peak from around 1880 to 1900, destroying almost all old-growth forest. Small-scale farming efforts began soon after colonization, but were impaired by the area's marshy terrain. Perennial floods often covered the entire floor of the river valley in 2 feet (0.61 m) of water. Following the authorization of drainage districts by the State Legislature in 1895, a drainage district was created around the mouth of the river in Kenmore.

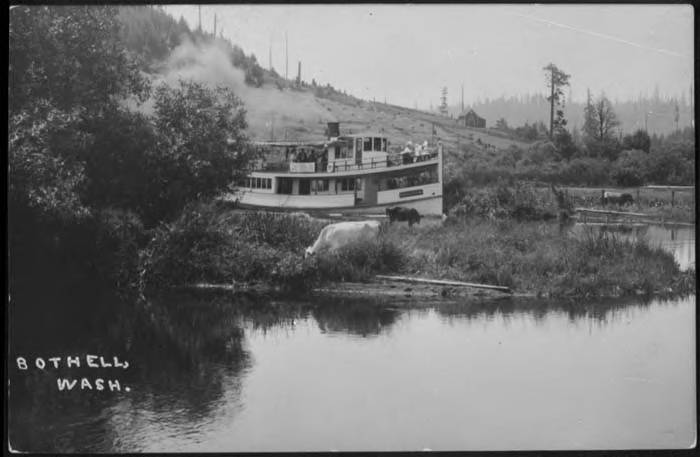
The steamer May Blossom on the Sammamish River near Bothell, c. 1914

During the 19th century, the Sammamish was one of the main travel routes in the Eastside of King County, with pole-drawn barges serving as the main form of transportation. In 1884, the steam-powered scow Squak began operating as a ferry on the river. However, the Seattle, Lake Shore and Eastern Railway expanded to Issaquah by the end of the decade, rendering river travel on the Sammamish less important. Shipping traffic to Bothell continued on the river until 1916.

==== River modification ====
In 1916, the Ballard Locks were opened. As a result, Lake Washington no longer drained into the Duwamish River, but instead flowed directly into Puget Sound through the Lake Washington Ship Canal, lowering water levels in the lake by about 9 feet (2.7 m). Although the water level of Lake Sammamish also decreased, the elevation difference between Lake Washington and Sammamish increased to about 12 feet (3.7 m), which increased the river's flow rate. All of the river's present course in what is now Marymoor Park was likely an extension of Lake Sammamish prior to the opening of the ship canal.

Around this time, farmers in the region formed a drainage district to manage the river and drain its wetlands. The district took extensive channelization efforts, straightening the upper course of the river to roughly its present position and digging drainage ditches. Most of the river's wetlands and side channels were destroyed, as were many of the spring-fed creeks which drained into it. Beginning in 1928, people raced hydroplanes on the river annually in the Sammamish Slough Race. This event was held until 1976, when a boat injured a spectator.

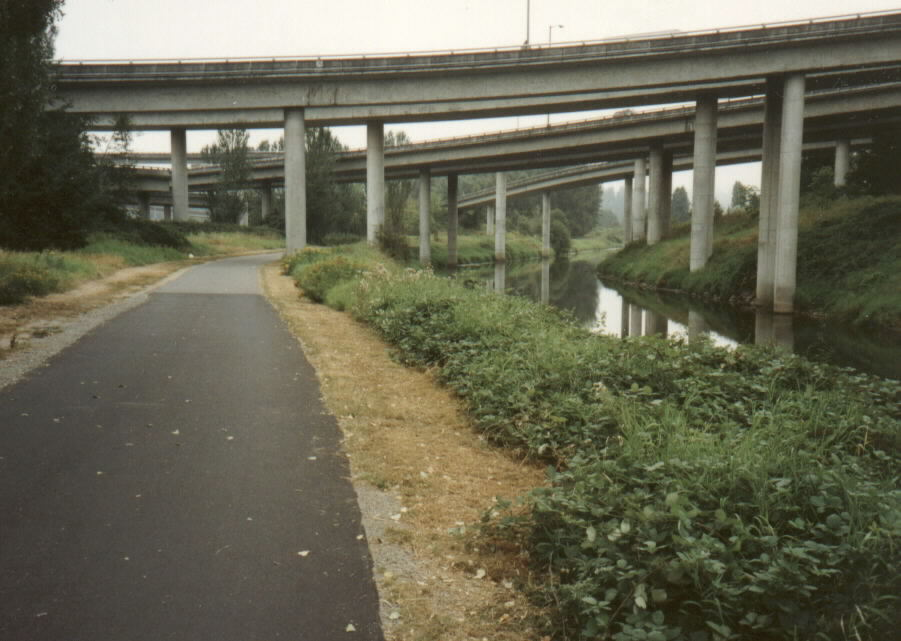
The Sammamish River crossing under Interstate 405 near Woodinville, 1992

The Sammamish continued to flood annually throughout the early and mid-20th century, with dredging by the drainage district yielding only partial success in limiting floods. In 1961, federal funds were appropriated for the U.S. Army Corps of Engineers and King County to begin flood control efforts, clearing wetland and abandoned river channels along the river. They also removed riparian vegetation such as willows, leading to increased water temperatures. Beginning in 1962, the Corps dredged and channelized much of the river, hardening its banks and deepening it by about 5 feet (1.5 m) through its course. Around this time, the Corps upgraded and expanded a weir about 0.5 miles (0.8 km) downstream from the source of the river. A 1,400 feet (430 m) ramp downstream of the weir was added to serve as a transition zone, aimed at limiting the river to a flow of 1,500 cu ft (42,000 L) per second and ensuring a stable height for Lake Sammamish. A notch was added to the structure in 1998 to allow fish and small boats to pass.

==== Development and restoration ====
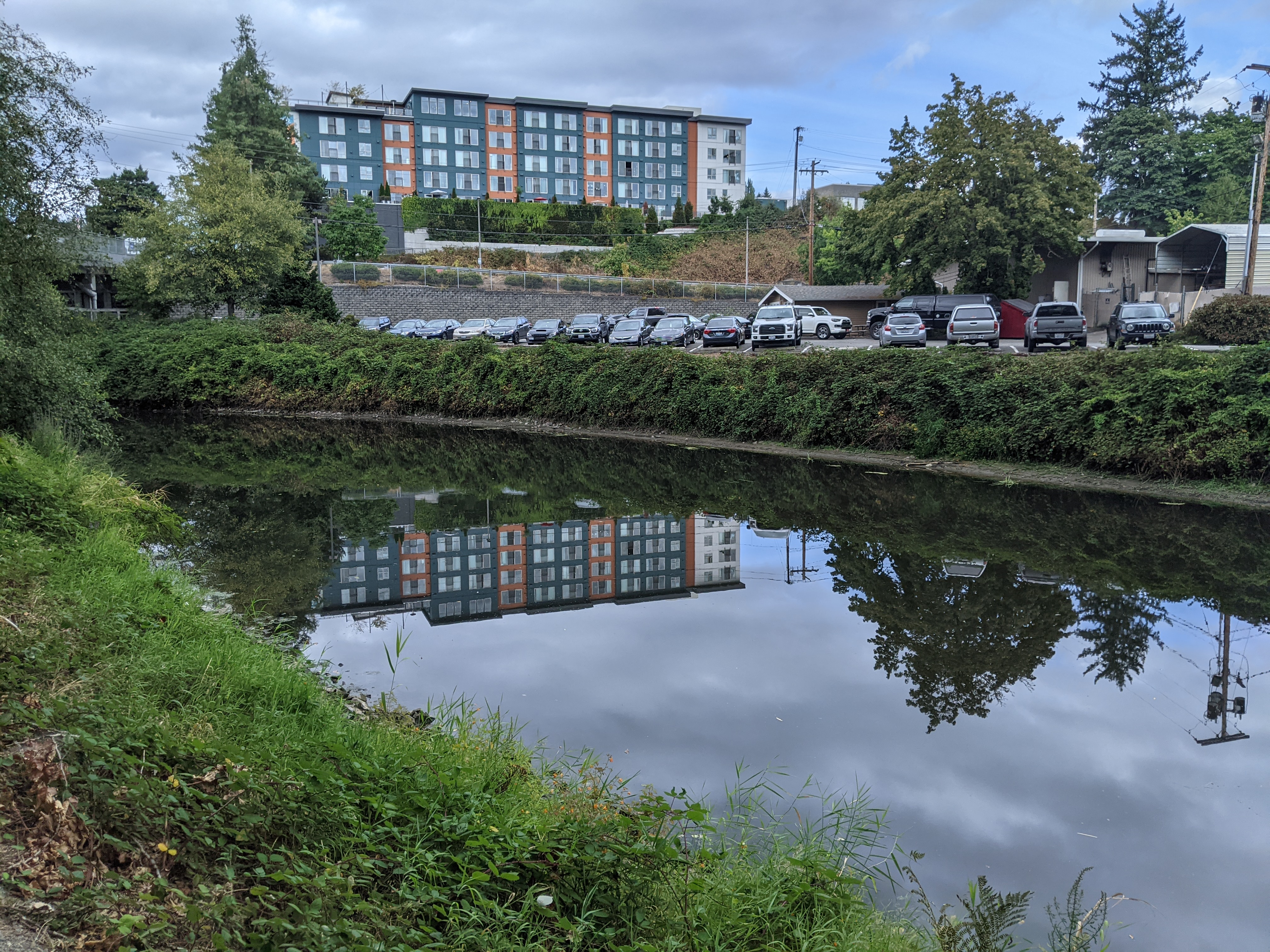
A parking lot and new development seen from the Sammamish River Trail in Bothell

During the mid-20th century, the Sammamish River valley hosted various dairy, poultry, and berry farms. Land development spread through the area in the 1960s, with the food and beverage industry among the primary drivers. In 1985, the county designated 1,000 acres (4.0 km^{2}) as a protected agricultural zone in response to urban encroachment.

Rapid urban development began in and around Redmond during the 1980s and 1990s, boosted by the growth of technology businesses such as Microsoft and Amazon. Redmond's population grew from 11,000 in 1970 to over 65,000 by the early 2020s, with almost twice as many present during the workday. A habitat restoration project in 1994 focused on improving fish and wildlife habitat across three stretches of the river and a tributary stream, while restoration efforts planted 28.6 acres (11.6 ha) of riparian forest along the Sammamish from 2015 to 2025. During this time, about 1.6 acres (0.65 ha) of forest was destroyed along the river for construction work on Interstate 405.

== Notes ==
=== Bibliography ===
- Booth, Derek B.; Haugerud, Ralph A.; Troost, Kathy Goetz (2003). "The Geology of Puget Lowland Rivers". Restoration of Puget Sound Rivers. University of Washington Press. ISBN 9780295982953.
- Carey, Barbara M. (2003). Groundwater/Surface Water Interactions in the Upper Sammamish River: A Preliminary Analysis (PDF) (Report). Washington State Department of Ecology.
- Chatters, James C.; Brown, James W. (2024). "The Age of Marymoor (45KI9) and Its Place in the Cultural Chronology of the Southern Puget Sound Region". Journal of Northwest Anthropology. 58 (1): 26–47.
- DeVries, Paul; Yoder, Clair; Huang, Chiming; Anderson, Glen; Oliver, Karee; Cooksey, Mike (2010). Assessment of Summer Temperatures and Feasibility and Design of Improved Adult Chinook Salmon Thermal Refuge Habitat in the Sammamish River (PDF) (Report). Muckleshoot Indian Tribe.
- Kerwin, John (2001). Salmon and Steelhead Habitat Limiting Factors Report for the Cedar-Sammamish Basin (Water Resources Inventory Area 8) (PDF) (Report). Washington Conservation Commission.
- Mohamedali, Teizeen (2015). Quality Assurance Project Plan: Sammamish River Temperature and Dissolved Oxygen Total Maximum Daily Load Study Design (PDF) (Report). Washington State Department of Ecology.
- King County. "Sammamish River Trail".
- King County Department of Natural Resources and Parks (2005). Sammamish River Water and Sediment Quality Assessment Final Report (PDF) (Report). King County.
- King County Department of Natural Resources and Parks (2022). Sammamish River Valley Groundwater Study: 2002-2020 Assessment (PDF) (Report). King County.
- King County Water and Land Resources Division (December 20, 2022). "Sammamish River History". ArcGIS StoryMaps.
- Ruby, Robert H.; Brown, John A.; Collins, Cary C. (2010). A Guide to the Indian Tribes of the Pacific Northwest. University of Oklahoma Press. ISBN 9780806189505.
- Tetra Tech (2002). Sammamish River Corridor Action Plan (Report). King County.
- Washington State Department of Ecology (1995). Draft Initial Watershed Assessment: Water Resources Inventory 8, Cedar-Sammamish Watershed (PDF) (Report). Washington State Department of Ecology.
- Washington State Department of Ecology (2024). Watershed Restoration and Enhancement Plan: WRIA 8, Cedar-Sammamish Watershed (PDF) (Report). Washington State Department of Ecology.
- Whitely, Peyton (October 21, 1999). "Dredging Over Decades Turned Winding River Into Slow-Flowing Ditch; Project Would Never Be Considered Today". The Seattle Times.
- Williams, R. Walter; Phinney, Lloyd A. (1975). A Catalog of Washington Streams and Salmon Utilization (PDF) (Report). Vol. 1. Washington Department of Fisheries.
- WRIA 8 Salmon Recovery Council (2026). Lake Washington/Cedar/Sammamish Watershed (WRIA 8) 2025 Progress Report (PDF) (Report). WRIA 8 Salmon Recovery Council.
