= Boushey Vineyard =

Vineyard in Washington

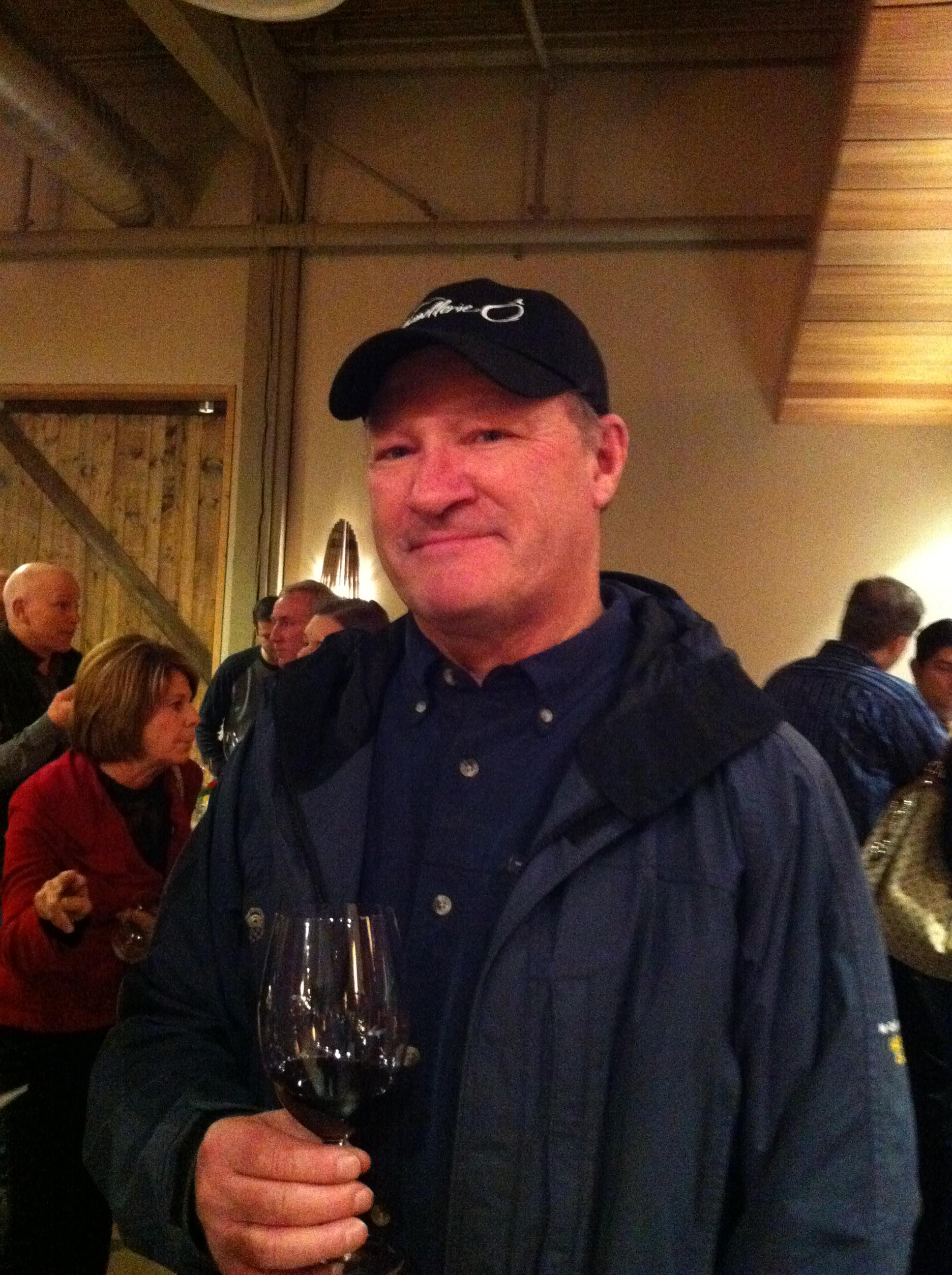
Grape grower Dick Boushey

Boushey Vineyard is a grape-growing estate located in the Yakima Valley AVA, north of Grandview, Washington. Grapes grown in the vineyard have been used to produce some of the most critically acclaimed Washington wines with the name Boushey regularly being featured on vineyard designated wines. Paul Gregutt, wine writer for the Seattle Times and Wine Enthusiast, list Boushey as one of the "top ten" vineyards in the entire state. The vineyard is owned and managed by viticulturist Dick Boushey who was honored in 2002 by the Washington State Wine Commission as Washington's "Grower of the Year" and in 2007 by Wine & Spirits as their "Grower of the Year". After Red Willow Vineyard, which was planted with David Lake and Mike Sauer, Boushey was one of the first Washington wine growers to plant Syrah. Today, Boushey Vineyard is considered by wine experts such as Jon Bonné to be "One of the state's top Syrah spots" with many Washington Syrahs made from Boushey's grape receiving critical acclaim.

== Dick Boushey ==
Dick Boushey, a cherry and apple grower first planted Boushey Vineyard with Cabernet Sauvignon and Merlot in 1980—three years before the Yakima Valley was recognized as an American Viticultural Area. Boushey Vineyard was located in a cooler region of the Yakima Valley and the grapes grown here soon earned distinction for the unique terroir they exhibit that was different from grapes grown in the warmer Red Mountain AVA to the east and Wahluke Slope AVA to the north. At the request of Rhone Ranger winemaker Doug McCrea of McCrea Cellars, Boushey began planting Rhone varietals and was one of the earliest Washington vineyards to grow Syrah.

=== Opposition to the Rattlesnake Hills AVA ===
Boushey Vineyard is located among the Rattlesnake Hills but when part of the Rattlesnake Hills west of his vineyard was proposed as an American Viticultural Area, Dick Boushey was in opposition to the plan. Boushey argued that the area did not have distinctive terroir that would merit an AVA stating "I know of no regional style, specific variety or type of wine that is unique to this proposed area. The granting of this proposal would confuse consumers and undermine the existing Yakima Valley Appellation."

== Vineyard and grape varieties ==
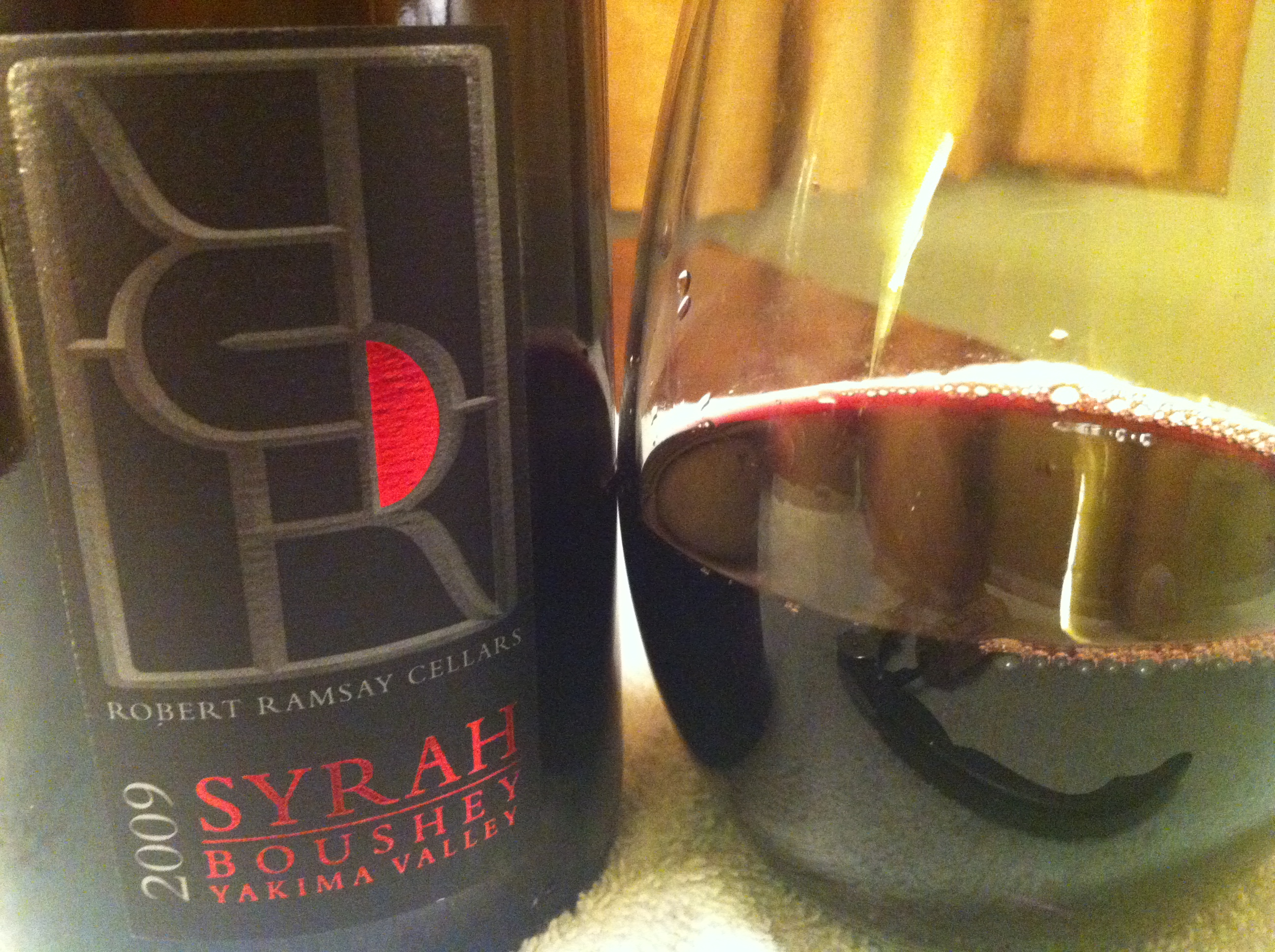
A Syrah made from grapes from Boushey vineyard.

Boushey Vineyard is actually composed of 5 locations, all near each other and Dick Boushey's home in Grandview. Across these locations the elevation varies from 800–1,400 feet (240–430 m) and include a diverse range of vineyard soils. The highest blocks of the Boushey Vineyard feature relatively shallow silt loam overlying fractured basalt. The vineyard blocks at elevations below 1,100 feet (340 m) have thick silt loam soils that overlie layered slack-water deposits of the Missoula floods. The vineyard receives an average of 2600 Growing degree-day a year, putting it on the Winkler scale as a Region II.

Among the grape varieties grown in Boushey Vineyard include Cabernet Sauvignon, Merlot, Cabernet Franc, Petit Verdot, Syrah, Sangiovese, Roussanne, Grenache blanc, Marsanne and Picpoul. The variety most often associated with Boushey is Syrah.

== Wineries ==
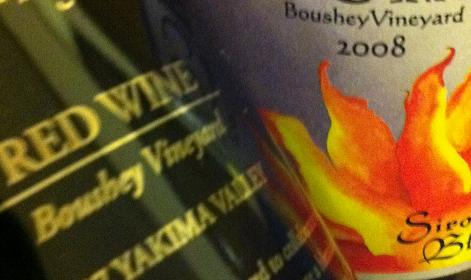
Boushey Vineyard regularly appears on vineyard-designated wines.

Boushey Vineyard grows some of the most highly sought-after grapes in Washington. Dick Boushey works closely with the winemakers who use his grapes, willing to accommodate them on viticultural issues such irrigation, canopy management, vine training and thinning, selling only to a core group of winemakers who produce wines that match the style that is characteristic of his vineyard.

A few of the wineries who use Boushey grapes (including those who produce vineyard-designated wines) include Avennia, Barrage Cellars, Betz Family Winery, The Bunnell Family Cellar, Chinook Wines, DeLille Cellars, Chateau Ste Michelle, Eight Bells Winery, Fidelitas Wines, Gorman Winery, McCrea Cellars, Structure Cellars, Syncline Wine, Three Rivers Winery, Two Vintners, Forgeron Cellars, Ross Andrew Winery, W.T. Vintners and Long Shadows. For Long Shadows, Boushey provides Syrah grapes for Australian winemaker (and former Penfolds Grange head winemaker) John Duval and Sangiovese for Tuscan winemakers Ambrogio & Giovanni Folonari.

== See also ==
- Champoux Vineyard
