= Red Willow Vineyard =

Vineyard in Washington, US

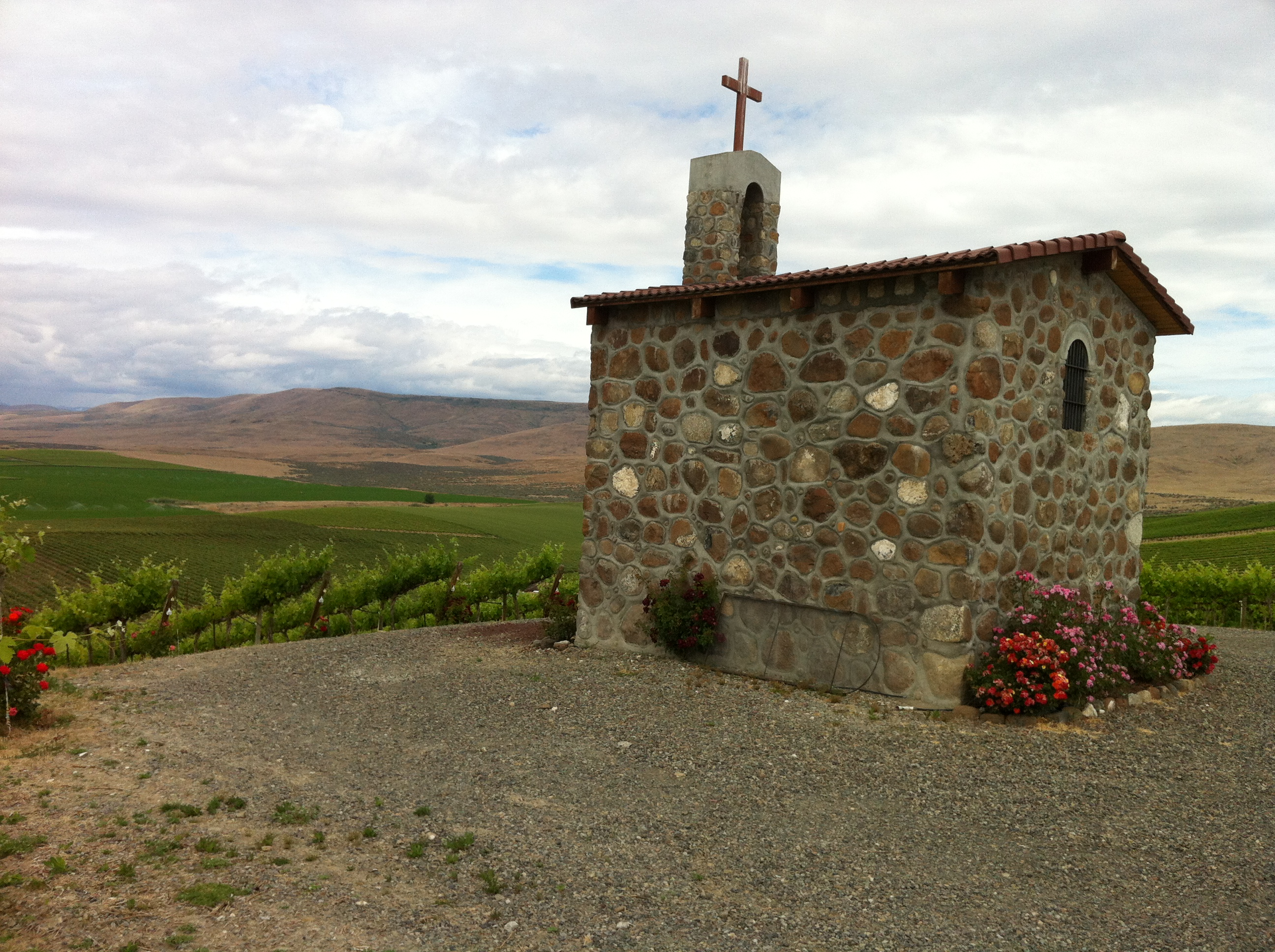
The Chapel and vineyards at Red Willow Vineyards in the Yakima Valley.

Red Willow Vineyard is a grape-growing estate located in the far western end of Yakima Valley AVA, within the Yakama Indian Reservation in Washington, US. Beginning with their relationship with Columbia Winery and Master of Wine David Lake, grapes from Red Willow have been used to produce some of the most critically acclaimed Washington wines with the vineyard's name regularly being featured on vineyard designated wines. Paul Gregutt, wine writer for the Seattle Times and Wine Enthusiast, list Red Willow as one of the "top ten" vineyards in the entire state.

First planted in the 1920s to potatoes and alfalfa by the Stephenson family, Red Willow switched to viticulture in the 1970s when Mike Sauer married into the family and planted 30 acres of Concord. With the urging of Dr. Walter Clore of Washington State University, Sauer began planting experimental blocks of Vitis vinifera. In 1973, Sauer planted 3 acres of Cabernet Sauvignon which, after Otis Vineyard in the lower Rattlesnake Hills and Harrison Hill Vineyard in the Snipes Mountain AVA, is one of the oldest plantings of Cabernet Sauvignon still being used for wine production. From the WSU experimental plantings also came Washington's first commercial planting of Cabernet Franc and through a 30+ year relationship with David Lake and Columbia Winery, Red Willow would pioneer the plantings of many new varieties including Barbera, Malbec, Mourvedre, Nebbiolo, Sangiovese, Tempranillo and Viognier.

== History ==
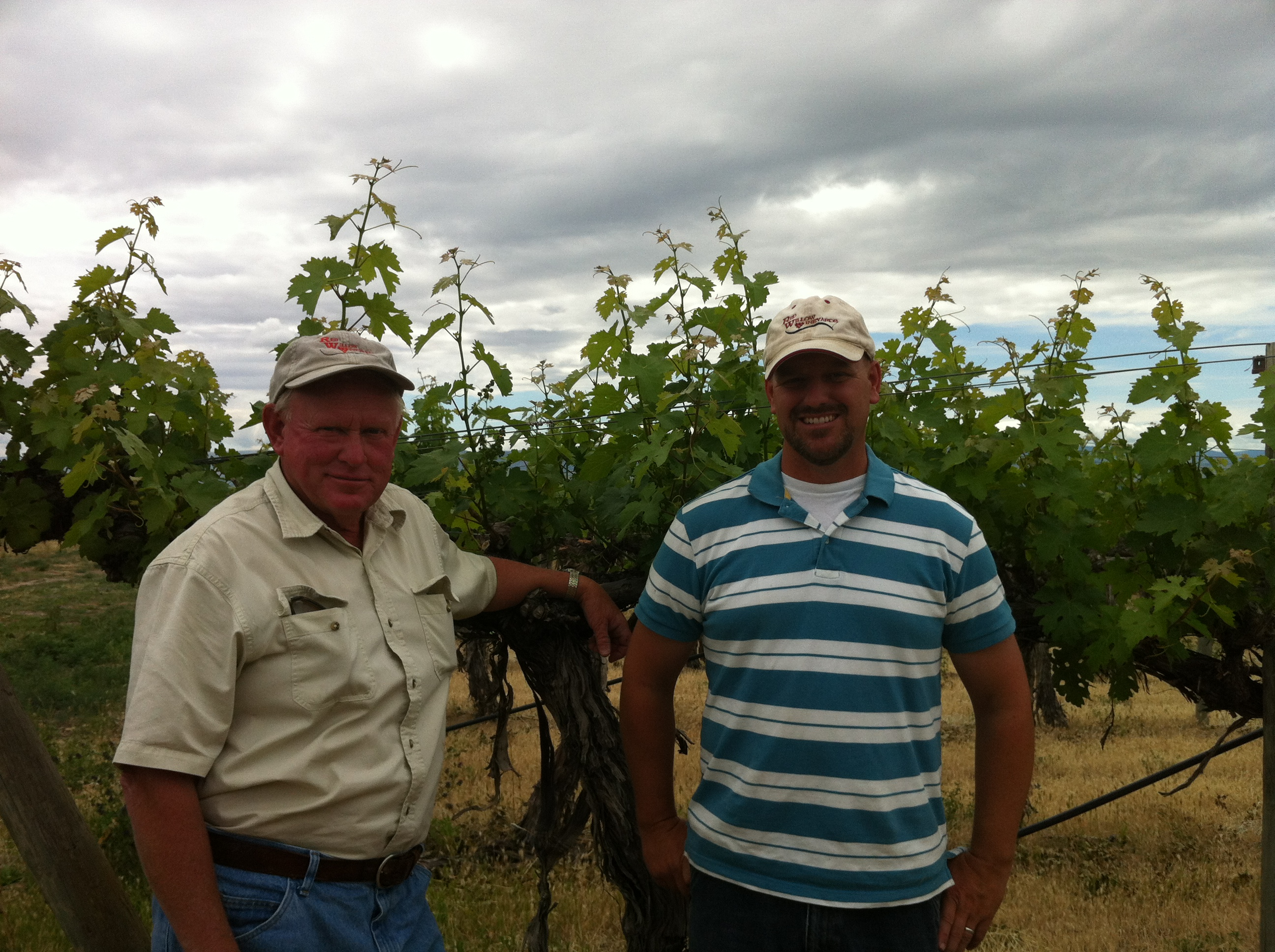
Mike Sauer and his son Jonathan, the 4th generation to be farming Red Willow, standing in front of one of the original 1973 Cabernet Sauvignon plantings.

The land that is today Red Willow Vineyard has had a long history as part of the homeland for the Yakama Nation of the Columbia Plateau. Following a series of tribal wars in the 1850s, the confederate tribes of the Yakama Nation moved to their current reservation south of the present day city of Yakima, Washington. In the 1920s, the Stephenson family purchased parts of what is now Red Willow Vineyard from the Yakama Nation tribe and planted it to alfalfa and potatoes while raising cattle on the higher slopes. The farm was named Red Willow after a dry creek that ran along the Ahtanum Ridge west of Yakima, Washington. The land continued to be a working farm until the late 1960s when Mike Sauer (who had married into the Stephenson family) returned home from college and began planting Concord grapes.

Following the success of the Concord, Sauer branched out and began experimenting with Vitis vinifera including Sémillon and Chenin blanc. These early vinifera plantings didn't survive in the rich-soil that the Concords were planted and soon Sauer began looking at the steep hills with poorer soils. In 1973, when a friend had a buyer back out at the last minutes on Cabernet Sauvignon cuttings, Sauer took the cuttings and planted 3 acres even though he didn't know at the time if Cabernet Sauvignon was a white wine grape or a red wine grape. During this same time, Sauer was working with Dr. Walter Clore of the WSU extension and research facility in Prosser to plant an experimental vineyard of grapes like Chardonnay, Gewürztraminer, Riesling and other varieties to see what kind of grapes could survive the cold Yakima Valley winters and grow to full ripeness.

Like many Washington wineries and vineyards, the 1991 60 Minutes special on the "French paradox" saw a surge of interest for Red Willow—particularly for red wine varieties such as Merlot. Columbia Winery introduced a special "Milestone Merlot" bottling of vineyard designated wine from Red Willow that would become a staple of Columbia's lineup until David Lake's retirement. Eventually the "Merlot boom" would die down and many red varieties were hard hit in the 1996 vintage by a series of arctic blasts that severely reduced the yields of that year. The one exception were the Syrah vines planted at Red Willow and younger Syrah vines planted from Red Willow cuttings on Red Mountain and many other vineyards in the Columbia Valley AVA. These demonstration of the winter hardiness of Syrah, as well as the critical acclaim for Syrahs made from Red Willow and other vineyard, would usher in a period of heighten interest for the variety.

=== Pioneering new grape varieties ===
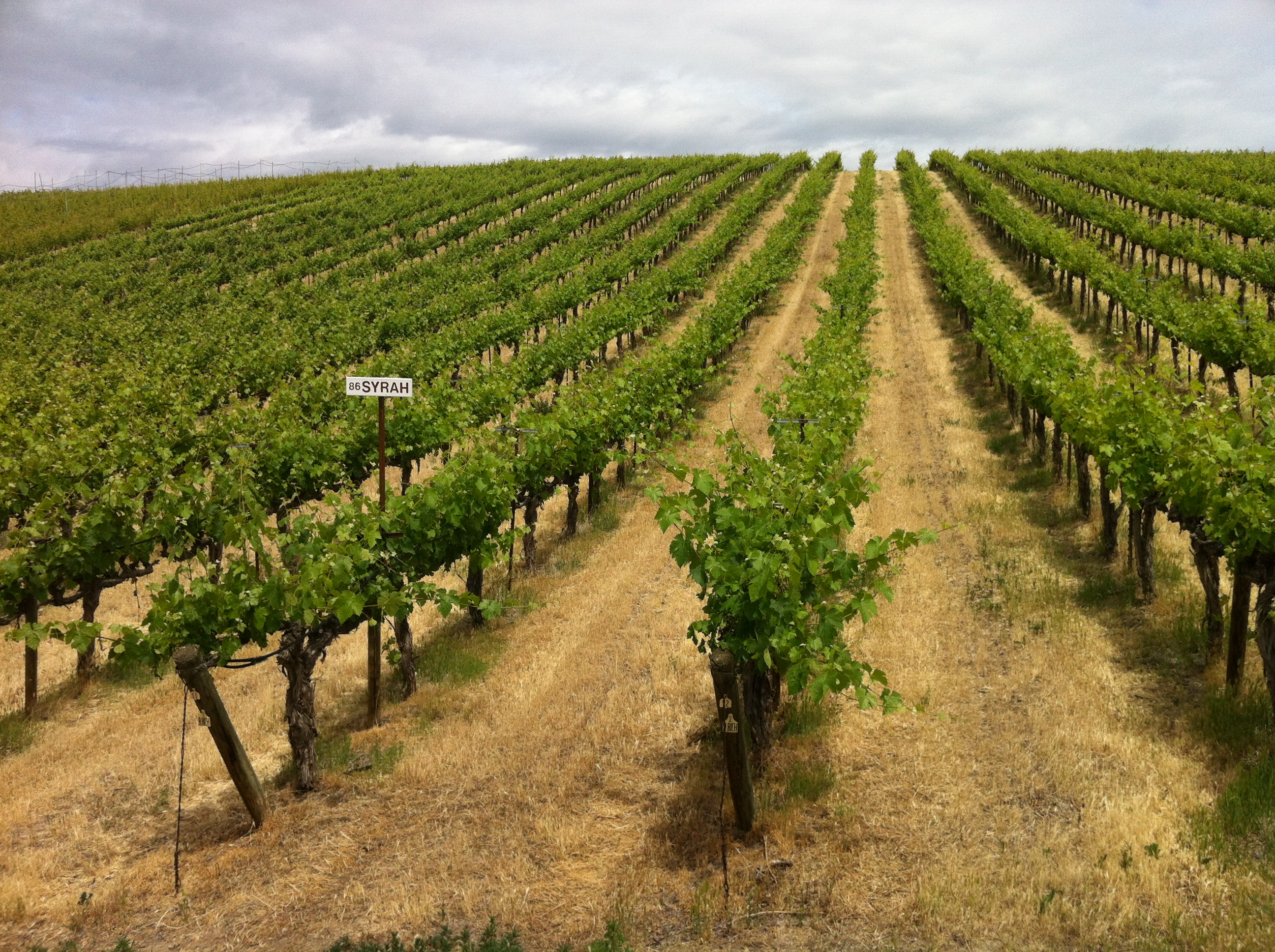
The original 1986 Syrah vines at Red Willow, the first planting of the variety in Washington State.

From Dr. Clore's experimental vineyard, Sauer would plant the first commercial block of Cabernet franc in Washington State. In 1979, Red Willow began a working relationship with Columbia Winery and their Master of Wine winemaker David Lake. The English-born Lake had an interest in making Washington wine from European grapes and encouraged Red Willow to expand their plantings. According to Mike Sauer "David was always very encouraging. If we would grow it, he would make the wine from it." In 1981, Columbia released the first vineyard designated wine to feature Red Willow on the wine label. From the 1983-1991, Red Willow and Columbia winery would pioneer the commercial planting and first varietal wines of many grape varieties including Malbec, Mourvedre, Nebbiolo, Sangiovese, Syrah, Tempranillo and Viognier.

The 1986 planting of Syrah was particularly significant in the history of Washington wine as it was the first planting of a variety that would go on to have much success in the state wine industry. At the urging of David Lake, Mike Sauer received several cuttings from Joseph Phelps Winery, one of the original California Rhone Rangers, and planted them. As a Master of Wine, David Lake had vast knowledge about the growing conditions of many notable wine regions and saw similarities between the hot, steep south-facing slopes of Red Willows and those of the Hermitage and Côte-Rôtie AOC in the northern Rhône Valley. Red Willow, in particular, reminded Lake of the La Chapelle vineyard in Hermitage that belongs to Jaboulet. David Lake and several cellar workers from Columbia came to Red Willow to assist in the planting of the first Syrah vines. Amidst the vines the crew buried several bottles of Hermitage, Côte-Rôtie and other Rhone wines to "inspire" the Syrah vines.

Columbia Winery used the grapes from the 1988 vintage to make the first varietal Syrah in Washington State which went on received critical acclaim from even French Rhône producers. Soon other wineries, such as Boushey Vineyard in the Yakima Valley, were receiving cuttings from Red Willow to plant in their vineyard. By the turn of the 21st century, wine writer Paul Gregutt estimated that at least 100 wineries were making 250-300 different bottlings of Syrah.

=== Modern day and Les Vignes de Marcoux ===
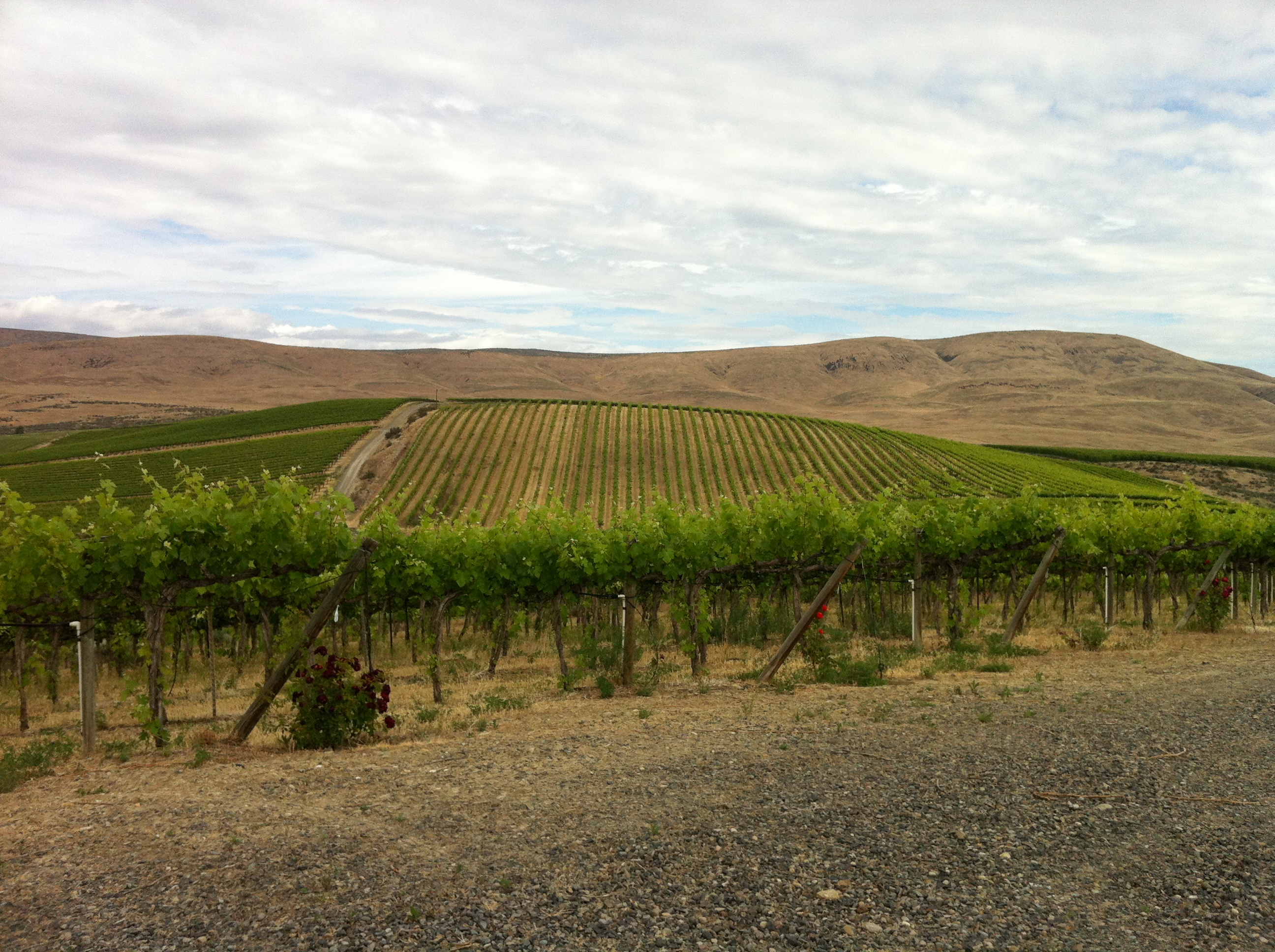
The Ahtanum Ridge in the background behind the vines of Red Willow.

In the 1990s and 2000s, the emphasis of Red Willow has been on exploring new clonal selections and matching clones to terroir. Many of the most recent plantings have been newer clones of Cabernet Sauvignon and Syrah as well as dividing existing plantings of the vineyards into smaller blocks that reflect the same growing and ripening conditions.

In the early 2000s, Sauer planted a second vineyard about 3/4 of a mile west of Red Willow named Les Vignes de Marcoux after his mother's maiden name, Marcoux. This vineyard with it soft rolling hills had a much different topography than the steeper slopes of Red Willow. It was planted to newer clones of some of the Red Willow varieties but also to newer varieties such as Aglianico, Barbera and Carménère.

== Geography and climate ==
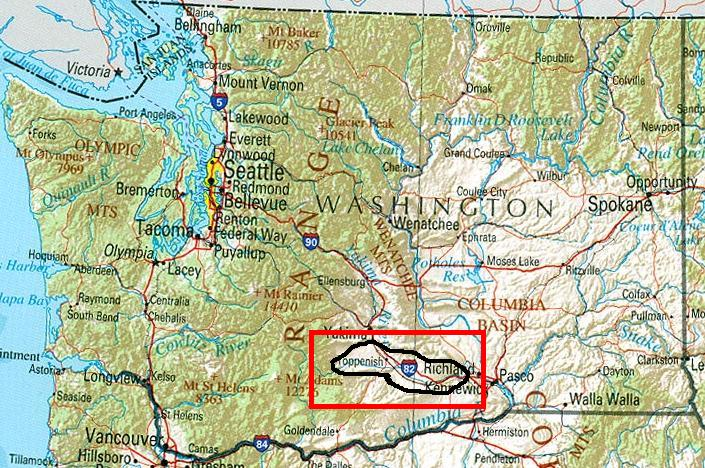
Red Willow is located in the far northwest end of the Yakima Valley AVA.

Red Willow Vineyard is located in the northwest corner of the Yakima Valley on the south slope of the Ahtanum Ridge just south west of the Union Gap within the ridge that connects the flat Yakima Valley to the rest of the Columbia Valley plateau. It is the most northerly and westerly vineyard in the Yakima Valley AVA. The vineyards sit between 1100–1300 feet above the ancient floodplain left over from the cataclysmic Missoula floods that ravaged the area between 15,000-13,000 years ago.

The soil profile of the vineyard is very diverse across the collection of east, west and south-facing slopes. Throughout the vineyard is a mix of calcareous rocks, clay, loam, sand, sandstone and silt. The soils are very well draining and with the arid desert climate of the region that sees only around 6 inches of annual precipitation, irrigation is a must. Located on the far western edge of the Yakima Valley, Red Willow experiences generally warmer climate conditions than the greater Yakima Valley with growing degree day averaging 2796 units since 2003 in contrast to the 2169 GDD units averaged by Yakima Valley vineyards in the sub-appellation of the Rattlesnake Hills AVA.

Still, Red Willow Vineyard is cooler than the warmer growing conditions in other Washington AVAs such as the Wahluke Slope (AVA) and Red Mountain. This allows for longer growing period with harvest at Red Willow often happening up to three weeks later than at sites on Red Mountain. This longer ripening period tends to produce grapes with brighter flavors and more elegant structure than from vineyards on warmer sites.

== Grape varieties ==
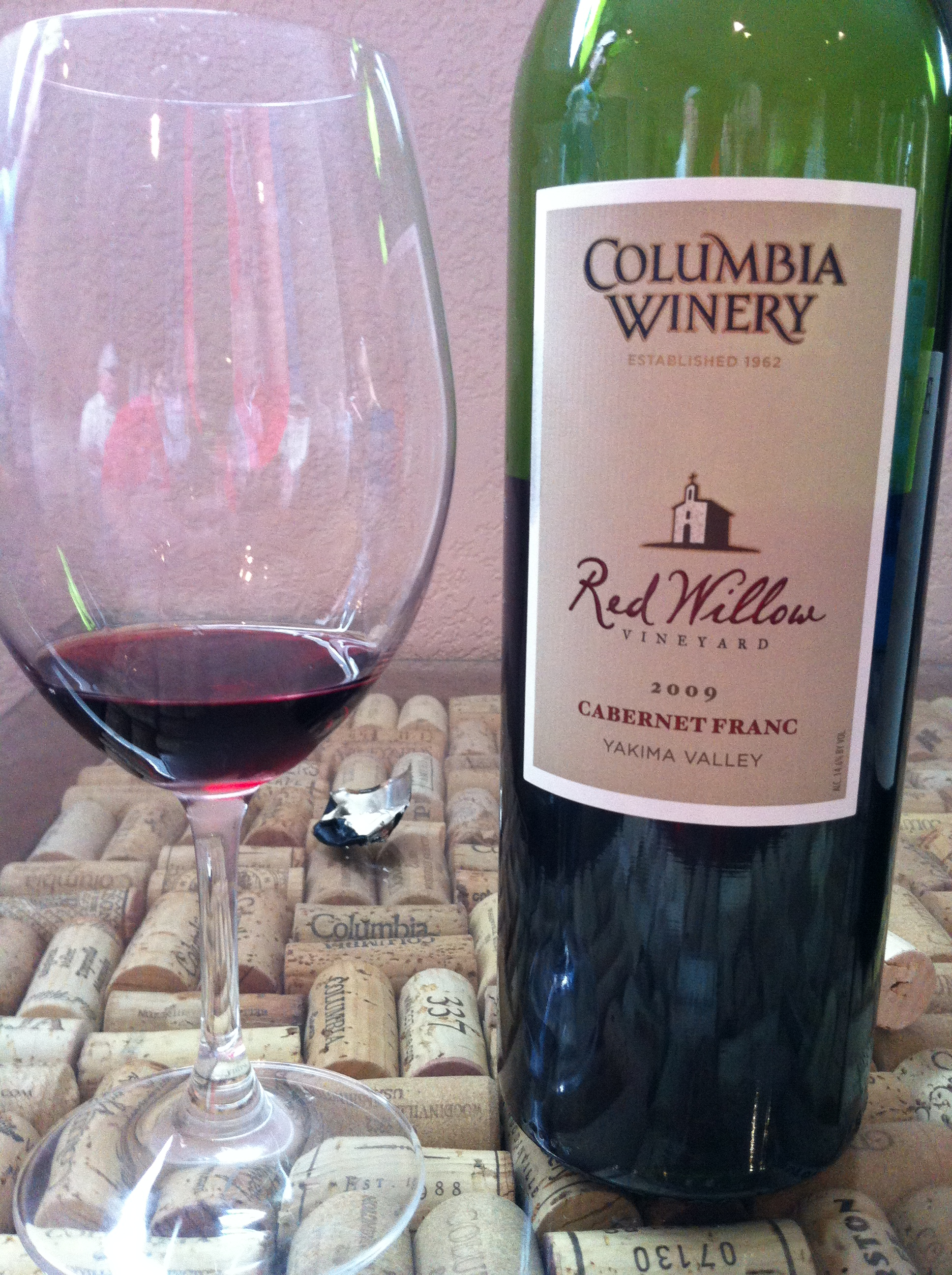
A vineyard designated Cabernet Franc from Columbia Winery made from Red Willow grapes.

Over the years Red Willow has planted many grape varieties, including several that the vineyard pioneered for the state. Among their notable plantings:

- Viognier - first planted in Washington State here in 1983
- Cabernet franc - first planted as an experimental block with Dr. Clore in the 1970s. Commercial planting in 1985. Columbia's 1991 Red Willow Cabernet Franc was the first varietal bottling of this grape variety in Washington.
- Cabernet Sauvignon - First planted in 1973
- Mourvedre - first planted in Washington State here in 1983
- Nebbiolo - first planted in 1985
- Petit Verdot - first planted as an experimental block with Dr. Clore in the 1970s with a commercial planting in 1985 but planting failed to take.
- Syrah - first planted in Washington State here in 1986
- Sangiovese
- Tempranillo
- Merlot
- Lemberger
- Petite Sirah
- Dolcetto
- Barbera
- Riesling

== The Chapel ==
An icon of Red Willow Vineyard is the Monsignor Chapel built by the Sauer family on a hill planted mostly to Syrah in homage to the many chapel vineyards in France—particularly Hermitage in the northern Rhône wine region. As the hill was cleared for cultivation, the stones removed from the hillside were saved to construct the chapel.

== Wineries using Red Willow grapes ==
After having nearly a 30-year exclusive relationship with Columbia Winery, Red Willow began to diversify in the 2000s and today sells its grapes to wineries in Washington state, such as Avennia Winery, Betz Family Winery, Eight Bells Winery, Owen Roe Winery, DeLille Cellars, Gramercy Cellars, and Long Shadow Wineries with many of these producers make vineyard designated bottlings from Red Willow.

== See also ==
- Champoux Vineyard
