= Bethel Heights Vineyard =

Winery in Willamette Valley, Oregon, U.S.

Coordinates: 45.0362°N 123.1535°W

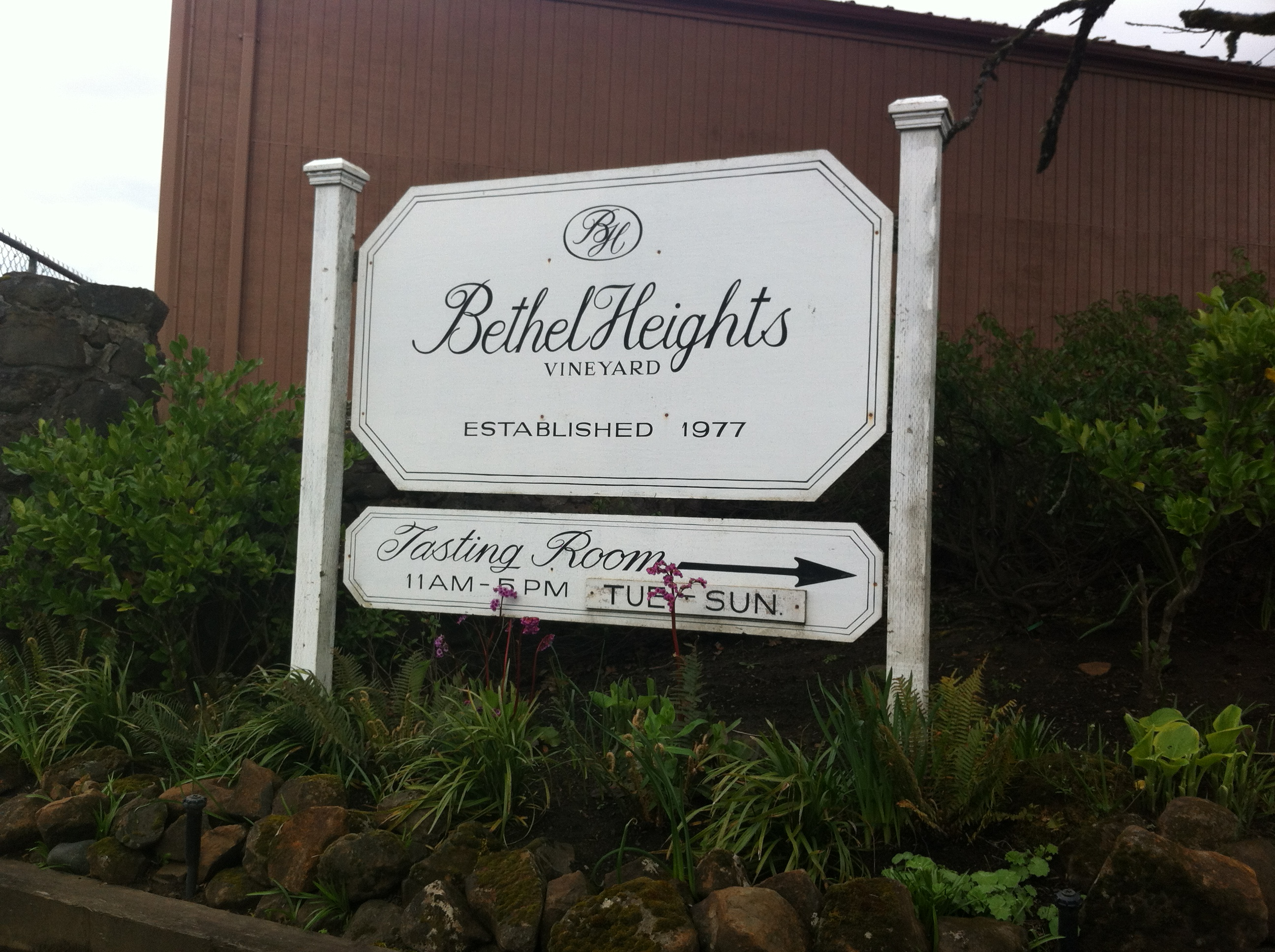
- Location: near Salem, Oregon, USA
- Appellation: Eola-Amity Hills AVA
- Founded: 1977
- Varietals: Pinot noir, Pinot gris, Chardonnay, Pinot blanc, Riesling
- Distribution: national
- Tasting: Open to public
- Website: http://www.bethelheights.com/

Bethel Heights Vineyard is an Oregon winery in the Eola-Amity Hills AVA of the Willamette Valley. Founded in 1977 by twin brothers Ted and Terry Casteel, their wives Pat Dudley and Marilyn Webb, and Pat's sister Barbara Dudley, the vineyard was one of the earliest plantings in the Eola-Amity Hills region. A winery soon followed, with the first estate wines produced in 1984. Bethel Heights specializes in Pinot noir, offering several individual block and vineyard designated bottlings, but also produces wines made from Chardonnay, Pinot gris, Pinot blanc, Riesling, Grüner Veltliner, and Gewürztraminer.

Today, the winery is still owned by members of the Casteel-Dudley-Webb families. The winery has earned a reputation in the region as a pioneer in "sensible and sustainable" viticulture, with Ted Casteel being one of the co-founders of the Low Input Viticulture and Enology (LIVE) certification program in the state of Oregon. In 1997, Bethel Heights was one of the first vineyards in Oregon to be certified Salmon-Safe, and it is a member of the Oregon Certified Sustainable Wine (OCSW). In 2007, it was among the first Oregon wineries to join the Oregon Global Warming Commission and pledged to go carbon neutral by 2010.

== History ==
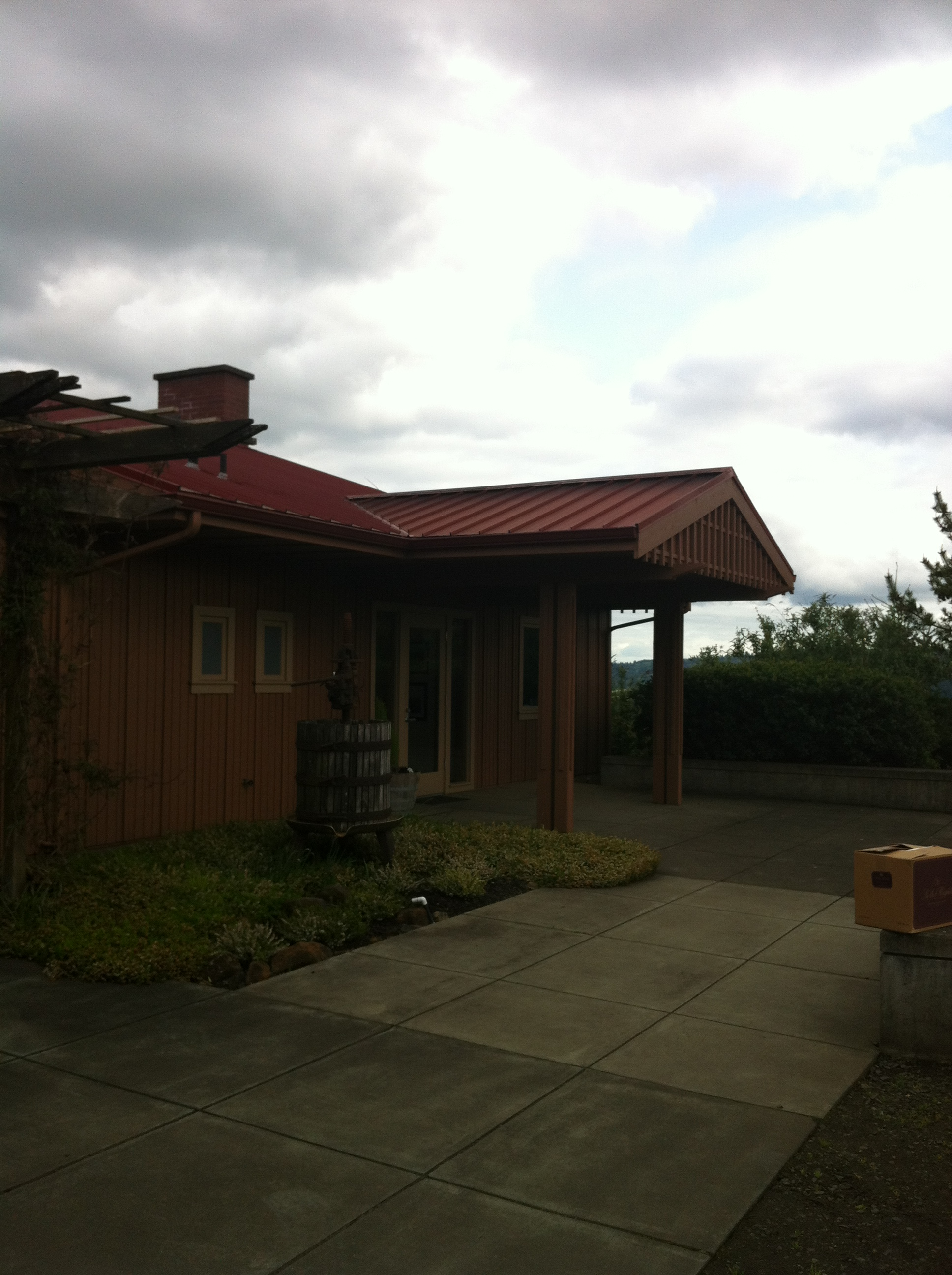
After years of grape growing, a winery was built on the estate in 1984.

Hearing about the growing Oregon wine industry and the work of pioneering winemakers making Pinot noir, the Casteel brothers and their wives sold their houses in Seattle, Washington and purchased land that was slated to become a trailer park in the Eola Hills northwest of the city of Salem, Oregon. The land was deemed "not suitable for farming," but the Casteels found the south-facing slope with good exposure and shallow, well-drained soils to be ideal for viticulture, so they purchased the land and planted 14 acres (5.7 ha) of Pinot noir vines in 1977. The Casteels named the area Bethel Heights after the unincorporated area of Bethel, Polk County, Oregon where the estate is located.

Over the years, the Casteels expanded and planted more acres to Pinot noir and other varieties such as Chardonnay and Pinot blanc. In 1984, a winery was built on the estate and they began producing wine under the Bethel Heights label with Terry Casteel taking over the main winemaking duties. By 1992, the winery operation had grown enough that the vineyard stopped selling fruit to other wineries and began using all of the estate grapes for the Bethel Heights label.

Many of Ted and Terry Casteel's children have followed in their parents' footsteps and are working in the winery. In 2007, Terry and Marilyn's son Ben Casteel took over head winemaking duties, as Terry's sense of smell declined due to the advancement of Parkinson. Ted and Pat's daughter Mimi was the general manager and viticulturist until 2016, when she left Bethel Heights to focus on her own vineyard, Hope Well. Today, the winery is still owned by members of the Casteel-Dudley-Webb families.

== Vineyards ==
Bethel Heights Vineyard is a 75-acre (30 ha) site located on the west slope of the Eola Hills just northwest of Salem in the shadow of Mount Jefferson. The grapevines are planted on south facing slopes at elevations between 480 and 620 feet above sea level. The estate has a diverse soil profile with soils at the 300 feet elevation being among some of the oldest soils in the Willamette Valley including sandstone and marine sediment that was laid over 35 million years ago when what is today Oregon was still part of the Pacific Ocean. At 500 feet elevation, the soil is much younger with red clay and volcanic soils from previous eruptions in the Cascade Range.

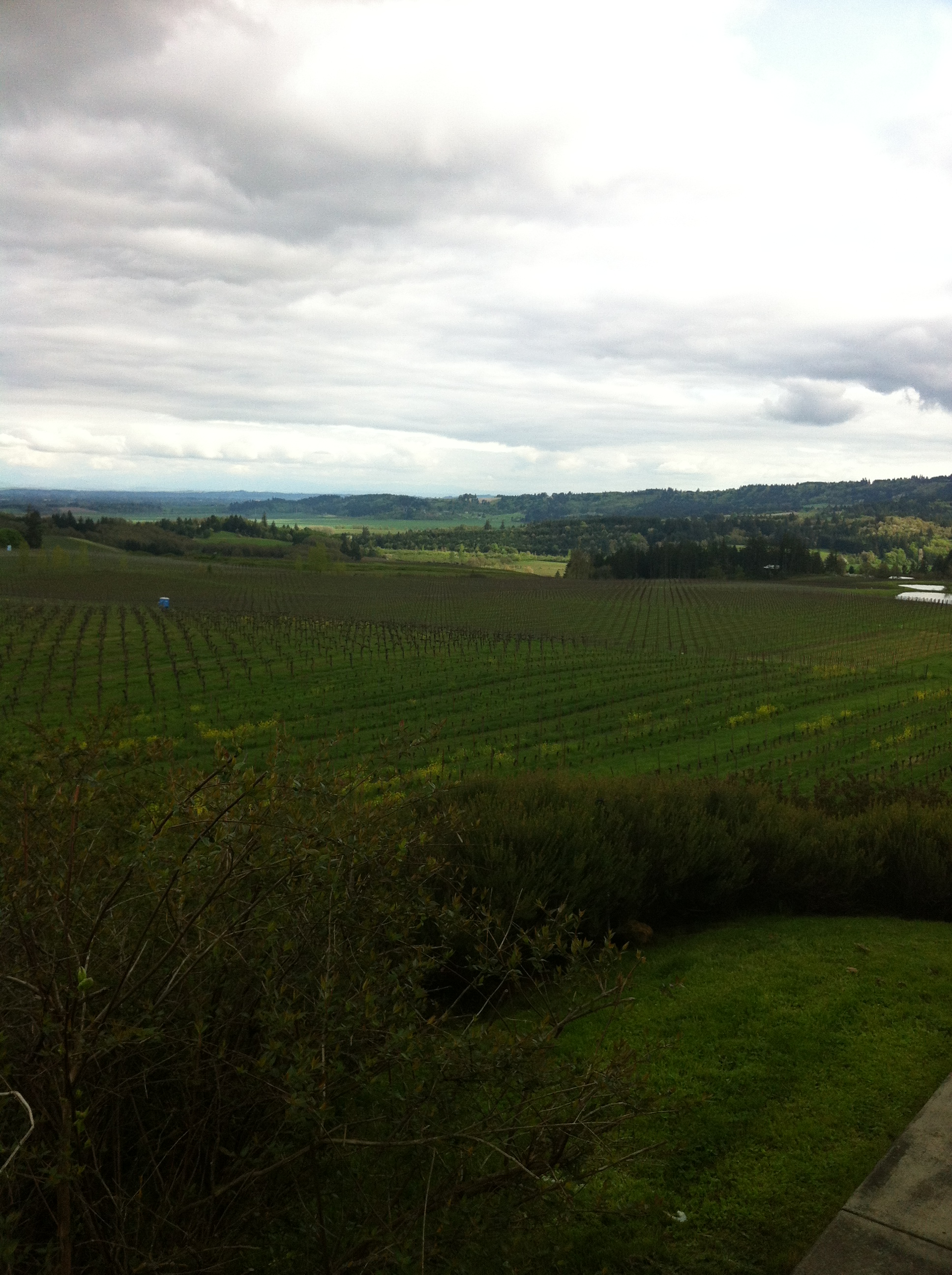
One of the Bethel Heights estate vineyards and the Eola-Amity Hills AVA as scene from the tasting room.

As of 2008, Bethel Heights had 50 acres (20 ha) planted with 37 acres (15 ha) dedicated exclusively to Pinot noir that is partitioned into individual blocks. These include:

- West Block - 6 acres (2.4 ha) planted with UC-Davis (UCD) Pinot noir clone 2A and 23 that planted on its own (non-grafted) rootstock in 1977
- Flat, South and Southeast Blocks - 16.3 acres (6.6 ha) planted with UCD 4 on its own rootstock in 1979
- Shed Block - 2.2 acres (0.89 ha) of Dijon Pinot noir clone 777 grafted onto 20-yr-old Chardonnay rootstock in 2000.
- Additional plantings include 5.5 acres (2.2 ha) planted with Dijon 114 and 115 on grafted rootstock in 1994 and 1996 and 6.5 acres planted with UCD 4, Dijon 115 and 777 in 2002. In 1999, Bethel Heights acquired the land just south of the main estate vineyard and began planting 20 acres of what is now known as Justice Vineyard. While considered an estate vineyard, some fruit from Justice is sold to other wineries. In addition to Pinot noir, Bethel Heights grows on their own estate Chardonnay from Wente and Dijon 76 clones as well as Pinot blanc and Pinot gris.

Bethel Heights first started as a vineyard selling its grape to other winemakers and soon got a reputation for the high quality of their Pinot noirs. In 1983, California wine producer Randall Grahm of Bonny Doon Vineyard even purchased grapes from Bethel Heights to produce an Oregon style Pinot noir that wine critic Anthony Dias Blue reviewed favorably. As the winery operation grew, Bethel Heights stopped selling its estate fruit to other wineries in 1992 and in by 1995 they were sourcing grapes (including Riesling, Pinot gris, Grüner Veltliner, and Gewürztraminer) from several well-known and well-respected vineyards throughout the Willamette Valley. These include:

- Seven Springs Vineyard - located on the eastern ridge of the Hills near Salem
- Elton Vineyard - located on the eastern slope of the Eola Hills west of Hopewell, Oregon
- Freedom Hill Vineyard - located northwest of the town of Monmouth, Oregon in the foothills of the Pacific Coast Range
- Nysa Vineyard - located in the Dundee Hills AVA
- Jessie James Vineyard - located on Walnut Hill near Amity, Oregon

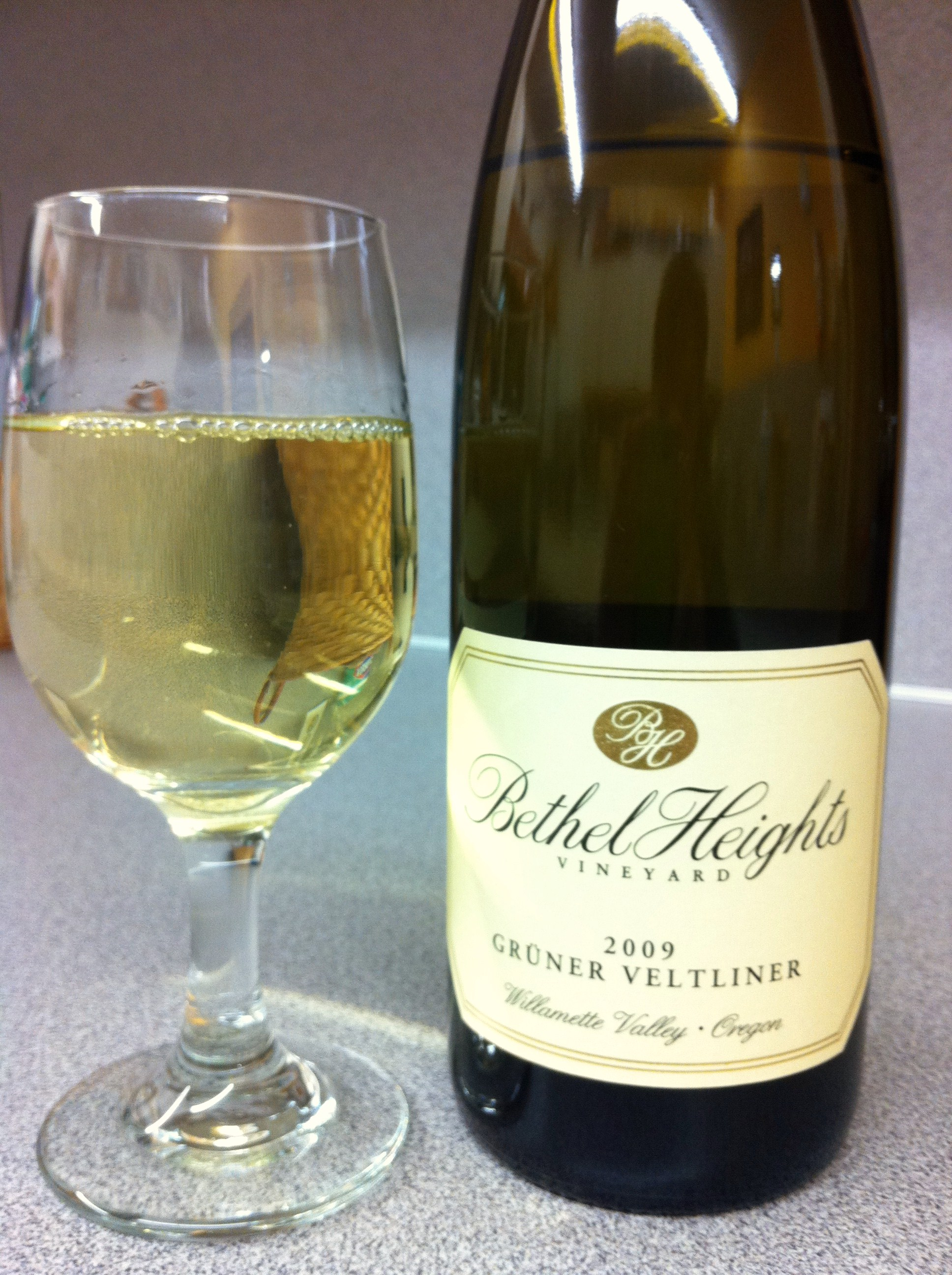
A Grüner Veltliner made by Bethel Heights

With several vineyards and designated blocks, Bethel Heights has adopted the Burgundian practice of producing several different bottlings of Pinot noirs from the individual blocks and vineyards. Terry Casteel noted to Wine Spectator that they do this because the grapes from the different blocks "...have distinct personalities, and they're complete wines." Casteel also notes that the reputation of a vineyard is enhanced by vineyard designated wine more than they would be going into a wine with a more generic Oregon wine or Willamette Valley wine label.

=== Sustainability ===
The winery has earned a reputation in the Oregon wine industry as a pioneer in "sensible and sustainable" viticulture with co-founder and vineyard manager Ted Casteel leading the efforts to create the Low Input Viticulture and Enology (LIVE) certification program. At the vineyard, Casteel and his daughter and viticulturist Mimi Casteel utilize elements of both organic and biodynamic viticulture practices that minimizes the use of synthetic chemicals in the vineyard. This includes using sulfur sprays (similar to the Bordeaux mixture) until post-bloom. Later in the season they do use some synthetic products for reliability and to lessen the overall environmental impact of fuel, emission and labor cost that repeated organic spraying would require.

In 1997, Bethel Heights was one of the first vineyards in Oregon to be certified Salmon-Safe and they are a member of the Oregon Certified Sustainable Wine (OCSW) with their wines carrying the OCSW logo since 2008. Under these criteria Bethel Heights commits itself to producing wine that is "... made using environmentally responsible agricultural practices and responsible winemaking practices, and those are verified by an independent, third-party certifying agency." In 2007, they were among the first Oregon wineries to join the Oregon Global Warming Commission and pledged to go carbon neutral by 2010. To further these efforts, the winery installed solar panels in their vineyards which supplies about 40% of their energy needs.

== People ==
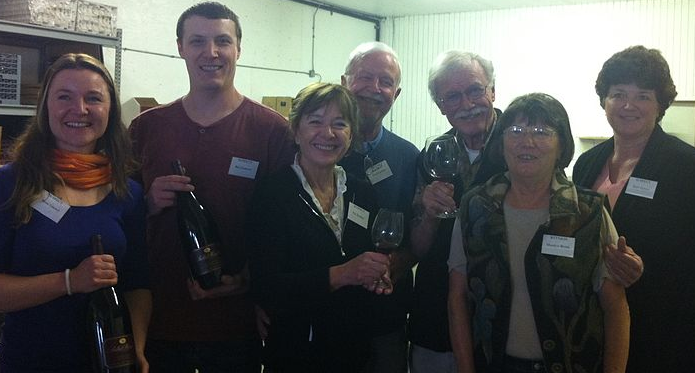
The Bethel Heights team. From left to right are Mimi Casteel, Ben Casteel, Pat Dudley, Ted Casteel, Terry Casteel, Marilyn Webb and Kate Crowe.

Twin brothers Ted and Terry Casteel founded Bethel Heights with their partners and other family members in 1997. The Casteel brothers graduated from Whitworth University in Spokane, Washington with Ted going on to teach European History at the University of Michigan-Dearborn and Terry working as a clinical psychologist in Seattle. Soon after the Casteel purchased the vineyard, Ted went to study viticulture at the University of California-Davis while Terry did apprentice work at various Willamette Valley wineries. In 2010, Terry Castel was honored by Salud! for his contribution to the Oregon Pinot wine industry. Ted has become an industry leader when it comes to sustainable viticulture, co-founding the Low Input Viticulture and Enology (LIVE) certification program in Oregon.

Ted's wife, Pat Dudley is the president and marketing director for Bethel Heights. A graduate of Stanford University and Duquesne University, she was one of the co-founders of Oregon's Pinot Camp and is a former executive director of International Pinot Noir Celebration. Terry's wife, Marilyn Webb is the chief financial officer and celebrated chef who created "Marilyn's Kitchen" which designs recipes and meals that pair with Pinot noir and other Oregon wines. The second generation of the Casteel-Dudley-Webb family includes winemaker Ben Casteel, who learned winemaking in Burgundy and at Rex Hill Vineyards in Oregon and Mimi Casteel, a botanist and viticulturist. Jon Casteel, son of Terry and Marilyn, apprenticed at wineries in New Zealand and Oregon and today co-owns and runs Casteel Custom Bottling-a mobile bottling line that serves several wineries in the Willamette.

=== Influence on other winemakers ===
In its 35 years, Bethel Heights has also employed winemakers who have gone on to work at other notable wineries including Master of Wine David Lake, long time winemaker at Columbia Winery in Washington State, Véronique Drouhin from the notable Burgundian wine family of Maison Joseph Drouhin and winemaker at Domaine Drouhin in Oregon, and Gary Horner, head winemaker for Erath Winery in the Dundee Hills AVA who began his winemaking career on the bottling line of Bethel Heights.
