= Woodinville Subdivision =

Railway line in Washington State

The Woodinville Subdivision was a railroad line that was formerly owned by BNSF Railway. It takes its name from one of its original end points in Woodinville, Washington, United States. The line extended approximately 42 miles (68 km) in east King County and Snohomish County. The line's ownership was transferred in a deal involving King County and the Port of Seattle. After BNSF discontinuation of service, the section from Snohomish to Woodinville was owned by GNP and later by Eastside Community Rail (ECYR) who contracted with Ballard Terminal Railroad Company to operate Eastside Freight Railroad. As of 2024, the line that was being operated by Eastside Freight railroad is now officially railbanked as decided by the Surface Transportation Board. The section in Renton is still in use with access to the Boeing Plant.

== Route ==
The line was completed more than a century ago, between 1887 and 1904 by the Seattle, Lake Shore and Eastern Railway and by Northern Pacific Railroad. The northern section between present day Woodinville and Snohomish was completed in 1888 and the section between Renton and Woodinville known as "The Belt Line" was completed in 1904. By 1902 Northern Pacific Railroad held all interest in the line it (later became part of the Burlington Northern Railroad and then the Burlington Northern and Santa Fe). The route begins in the area of Renton and Tukwila, at a place called Black River Junction. The rails run north along the eastern shore of Lake Washington through Bellevue and several smaller cities before reaching its northern terminus in the small rural city of Snohomish.

The railroad is mostly single tracked with a few passing sidings to allow trains to pass each other and spurs for local industries. It is a former Northern Pacific branch line. The route also includes a branch line from Woodinville to downtown Redmond; this is a remnant from which the tracks have been removed off a former Northern Pacific line to North Bend via Issaquah where the tracks have also been removed.

A major feature of the railroad is the spectacular Wilburton Trestle, which was originally constructed in 1904. It was the longest wooden trestle in use in the Northwest until 2008. In June 2008, work commenced on the widening of I-405 south of Bellevue. As a result, the line was severed at the point at which it crosses the southbound lanes, just south of the railroad trestle. Currently there are no plans to reinstate the track now that the widening project has been completed.

== Uses ==
The line was primarily used for local freight traffic. Boeing uses the line to deliver 737 fuselages to its Renton plant from its supplier Spirit AeroSystems in Wichita, Kansas. Trains for the Boeing plant at Renton traveled through Seattle and entered the factory from the south. A bridge north of Renton depot was replaced in order to accommodate the width of the Boeing 737 fuselages transported by rail.

The line was also used to serve as a bypass during outages for the only other north–south rail route between the Cascade Mountains and Puget Sound, the Seattle/Scenic Subdivision, which runs through downtown Seattle and along Puget Sound. It was one of several corridors considered for potential commuter rail passenger service or reuse by another transit mode by the Central Puget Sound Regional Transit Authority (now Sound Transit) in the 1990s.

The line was also used by trains whose loads were too bulky to fit through the century-old Great Northern Tunnel that runs underneath downtown Seattle. However, its numerous sharp curves and bends, at-grade street crossings, and poor rail condition required trains to reduce speeds to no more than 30 mph (48 km/h) when being used as a bypass. After a rainstorm washed out part of the Seattle line in 1997, a freight train derailed navigating the line as such.

Until 2007, the line was also used by the Spirit of Washington Dinner Train, a tourist attraction. The Spirit of Washington's contract to use the railroad ended on July 31, 2007, and efforts to renew it have been rejected by both BNSF Railroad and King County.

== Sale and dismantling ==
In 2003, BNSF announced that it was looking to sell the line because of declining freight revenues and rising maintenance costs. The Port of Seattle purchased the right of way in 2008 for conversion to public-access rail trail. In 2012 the City of Kirkland purchased the portion of the line running within the city limits, intending to convert to a trail. The Ballard Terminal Railroad's federal lawsuit to stop Kirkland's trail plans was dismissed in Seattle on May 9, 2013. In January, 2015, the 5.75-mile (9.25 km) Kirkland portion of the Eastside Rail Corridor, with compacted gravel surfacing, opened for pedestrians and bicyclists as the Cross Kirkland Corridor.

Snohomish County acquired the right of way from Snohomish to the King County line at Woodinville in 2016. Snohomish county plans to continue with rail and trail in this part of the corridor.
