= Spirit of Washington Dinner Train =

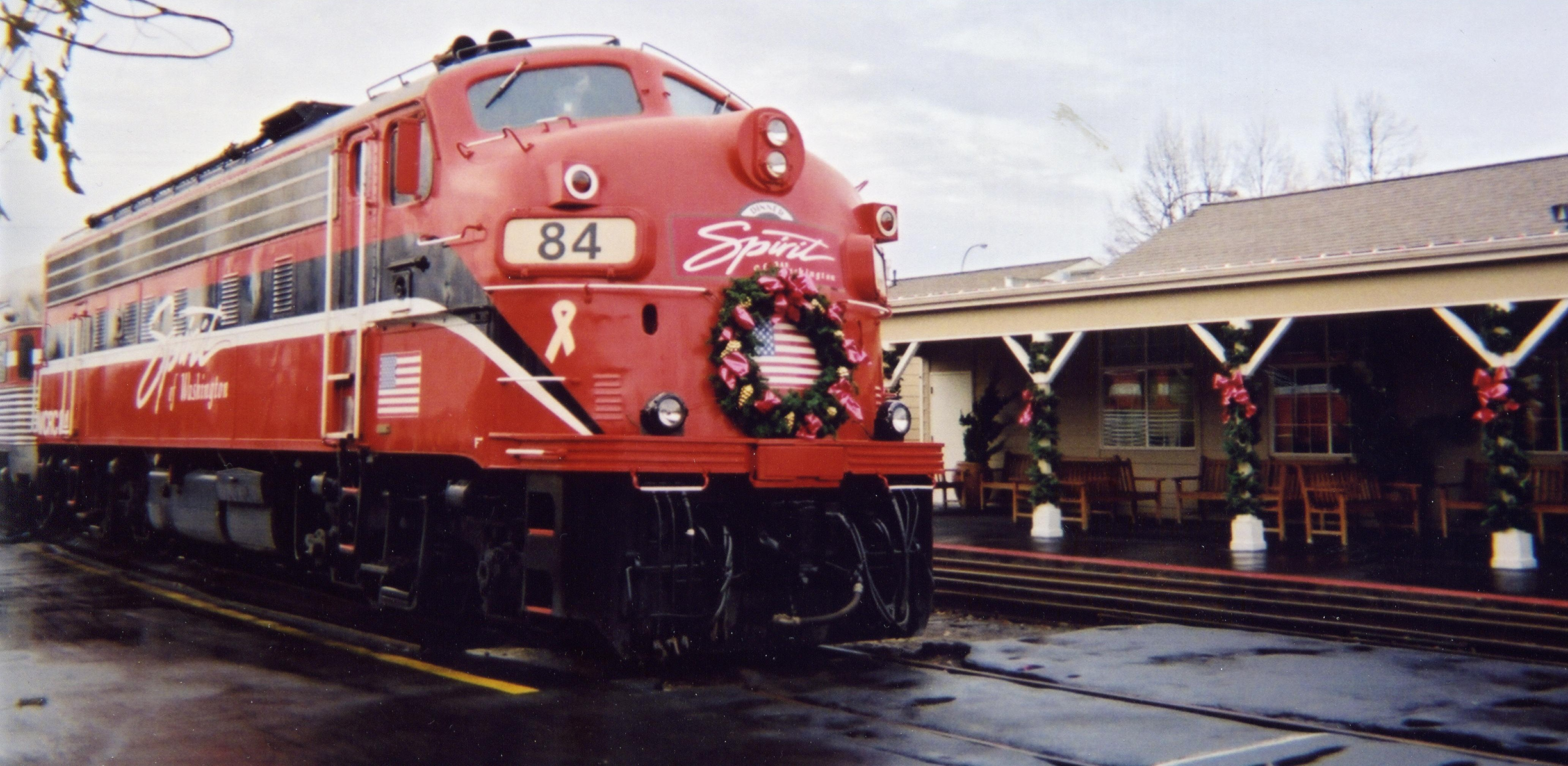
The Spirit of Washington Dinner Train during the Holiday Season

The Spirit of Washington dinner train was a dinner train that operated for 15 years from Renton, Washington, with trips heading to Woodinville and back, and then for three months out of Tacoma, with trips heading from Tacoma to Lake Kapowsin near Mount Rainier. On October 29, 2007, the operators of the dinner train announced they would be shutting down the Tacoma route due to poor ridership.

== History ==
The Spirit of Washington dinner train operated for 15 years out of Renton on the Woodinville Subdivision starting in the summer of 1993, with trips heading from a depot in Renton to the Columbia Winery in Woodinville and back. Before this, it ran from shortly after 1986 to 1993 between Yakima and Ellensburg. In the summer of 2007, the train was forced to change starting locations when the owners of the Woodinville Subdivision, BNSF Railway, would not extend their contract. BNSF allowed King County to move forward with improvements on I-405, which broke the connection between Woodinville and Renton.

Although the operators had wished to move the train to run between Woodinville and Snohomish, negotiations broke down, causing the train to relocate to Tacoma. It operated from August 3, 2007, until October 28 with Tacoma as the starting point. It serviced central Pierce County, on the line going from Tacoma to Lake Kapowsin near Mount Rainier and back.

== Cancellation ==
Due to poor ticket sales after the move to Tacoma, the owners decided to pull the pilot project and close the train down. It was stored in Clark County, Washington. The owners have suggested they would like to see a dinner train go between Vancouver, Washington, and Mount St. Helens, or to go between Woodinville and Snohomish again. Much of the equipment passed through Iowa Pacific Holdings which subsequently went bankrupt, its successor being Progressive Rail. The rolling stock was used on Progressive's Santa Cruz and Monterey Bay Railway in Watsonville, California until that was discontinued.

The Wilburton Trestle (which the train used to use) is scheduled to become a walking/bike access in 2026.
