= DeLille Cellars =

Winery in Washington state, U.S.

Coordinates: 47°43′54″N 122°8′29″W

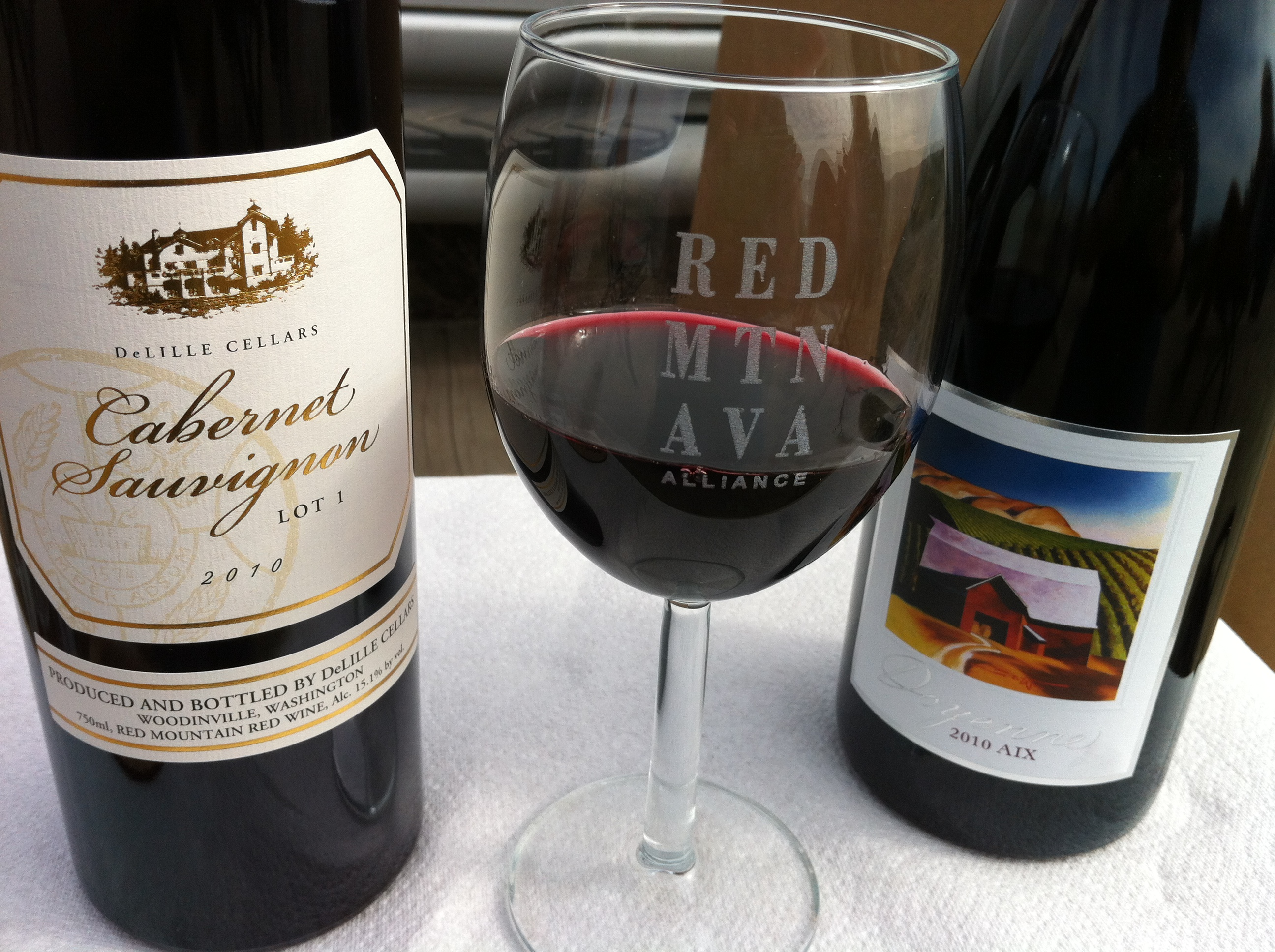
Wines from DeLille Cellars

DeLille Cellars is a winery in Woodinville, Washington, USA. The tasting room is located in the Hollywood District of Woodinville, at the former Redhook Brewery. DeLille Cellars specializes in wines using the Bordeaux grape varieties: Cabernet Sauvignon, Merlot, Cabernet Franc, and Petit Verdot. In 2000, DeLille won The New York Times Wine Today.com "Winery of the Year" award. It is one of Washington state's premier cult wines.

== History ==
The winery was founded in 1992 by Jay Soloff, winemaker Chris Upchurch, and Charles and Greg Lill. For the few first years, Master of wine David Lake served as consulting enologist.

In March 2019, DeLille Cellars moved all production and offices to the old Redhook Brewery site in Woodinville, with a new tasting room set to open in Fall 2019.

== Wines ==
DeLille Cellars has a portfolio of over a dozen Bordeaux and Rhône style blends.

Grand Ciel Cabernet Sauvignon, Chaleur Estate, D2, Harrison Hill, Four Flags Cabernet Sauvignon and Chaleur Blanc are the Bordeaux style labels. Rhone-style blends include Signature Syrah, Rhône-styled Syrah, produced from grapes grown in Boushey Vineyard, Métier (a Châteauneuf-du-Pape style red, and Doyenne (a Syrah and Cabernet Sauvignon blend. DeLille Cellars also makes a Roussanne and a traditional Rosé.

The winery sources its grapes primarily in the Red Mountain AVA in Eastern Washington and utilizes 100% French oak barrels. The winery has an estate vineyard on Red Mountain, Grand Ciel Vineyard.

At the 2001 San Francisco International Wine Competition, DeLille Cellars won "Best in Show" in the Premium red blend category for its 1998 Yakima Valley D2.

== See also ==
- Woodinville wine country
