= Walter Clore =

American iticulturist (1911–2003)

Walter J. Clore (July 1, 1911 – February 3, 2003) was a pioneer in wine growing and agricultural research in Washington state and has been formally recognized by the Washington State Legislature as the "Father of Washington Wine". Among his contributions to wine growing in Washington state was his extensive research into what areas of the state that premium wine grapes (particularly Vitis vinifera) would most thrive in.

== Early life ==
Born in Tecumseh, Oklahoma, Clore studied botany and agriculture in high school in Tulsa before attending Oklahoma Agricultural and Mechanical College (Today known as Oklahoma State University). While majoring in horticulture, Walter Clore also lettered in football as a lineman and was president of the agricultural fraternity Alpha Gamma Rho and elected to honorary membership to another agricultural fraternity Alpha Zeta. In the summers, he did survey work in Ohio and Indiana for the United States Department of Agriculture.

== Research and work ==
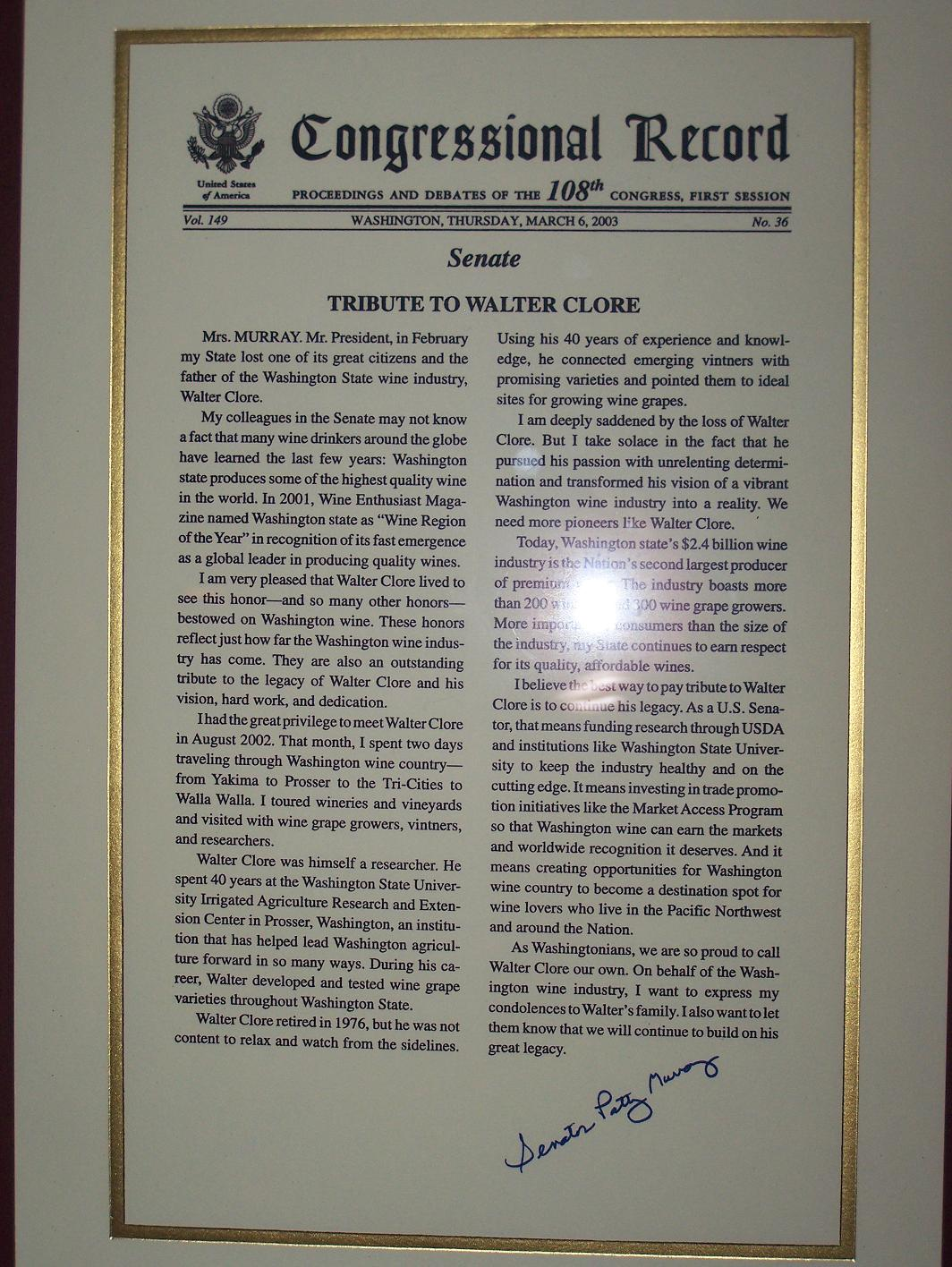
Congressional record from March, 2003 paying tribute to Dr. Clore and signed by Sen. Patty Murray.

In 1934, Walter Clore married Irene Welsh and accepted a horticultural fellowship at Washington State College (now Washington State University) in Pullman, Washington. One of his first studies there was to measure the effect of "Bordeaux Sprays" (a sulfur and lime based mixture) on the photosynthesis of red and golden delicious apples. In 1937, Clore became assistant horticulturist at the Irrigation Branch Experiment Station (now known as the Irrigated Agriculture Research and Extension Center) in Prosser. There he oversaw the experimental plantings of nearly 20 Vitis labrusca hybrids and 7 Vitis vinifera grape varieties. In the years that follow, under Clore's direction the plantings at the Experiment Station would expand to include 45 hybrids, 71 Vitis vinifera, and 10 interspecies Vitis hybrid rootstock. By 1974, Clore had overseen the plantings of 312 grape varieties.

His work laid the foundation for the rebirth of the Washington State Wine industry as it conclusively proved that premium quality vinifera wine grapes could be grown in the rich volcanic soil and warm climate of the Columbia River Valley. His test of trellis designs helped to promote the widespread adoption of modern mechanical harvesting techniques.

In recognition of his contributions, Clore's legacy continues through the Walter Clore Wine and Culinary Center in Prosser, Washington, which aims to educate the public about Washington wine and celebrate Clore's life and achievements.

== Awards and recognition ==
- 1967 "Mr. Asparagus" given by the Washington Asparagus Growers Association for his pioneering work in diversifying asparagus varieties as part of harvest management.
- 1977 "Man of the Year" by the Washington State Grape Society
- 1988 Governor's Award for his service to the Washington Wine Industry
- 1990 Award of Service from the Gamma Sigma Delta Honor Society of Agriculture
- 1992 "Alec Bayless Prize" for viticultural contributions to the wine industry
- 1993 Washington State University establishes the Walter J. Clore Scholarship for students in agriculture and home economics
- 1995 Merit Award from the American Society for Enology and Viticulture
- 2001, the Washington State Legislature passes a resolution to officially recognize him as the "Father of the Washington Wine Industry"
- 2001 Columbia Crest winery introduces the 1999 Walter Clore Private Reserve Bordeaux style blend in his honor. The winery has continued to honor him with additional wines in this series.
- 2014 The Walter Clore Wine and Culinary Center in Prosser, WA opens its doors after a decade of vision and hard work. The non-profit center honors Dr. Clore's legacy through tastings of featured wines from the state's 14 AVAs, interactive displays showcasing the history of wine and agriculture in Washington, and educational wine and culinary classes and experiences aimed at increasing consumers' knowledge and enjoyment of Washington wine and food. The location was chosen to reflect Dr. Clore's impact and how his work positioned Prosser as the birthplace of Washington wine.

== See also ==
- Washington wine
- List of wine personalities
