= Woodinville wine country =

Coordinates: 47.73449°N 122.14187°W

Woodinville wine country is an area of Western Washington situated around the city of Woodinville, approximately 30 minutes to an hour driving time from downtown Seattle (depending on traffic). The area is home to more than 130 wineries and tasting rooms, including several of the state's notable wineries, such as Chateau Ste. Michelle, Columbia Winery, Novelty Hill Januik, Silver Lake, Matthews Winery, and Tenor Wines. While located within the Puget Sound AVA area, the majority of wineries in Woodinville wine country source their grapes from Eastern Washington American Viticultural Areas like Columbia Valley and Yakima Valley. In addition to making wine, several of the wineries in Woodinville wine country are open for tours and tastings, with Chateau Ste. Michelle also having a regular summer concert series at its amphitheater. Woodinville Village, currently under development, will showcase some of the smaller wineries in the area that are not normally open to the public.

State Route 202 runs through the heart of Woodinville wine country.

== History ==
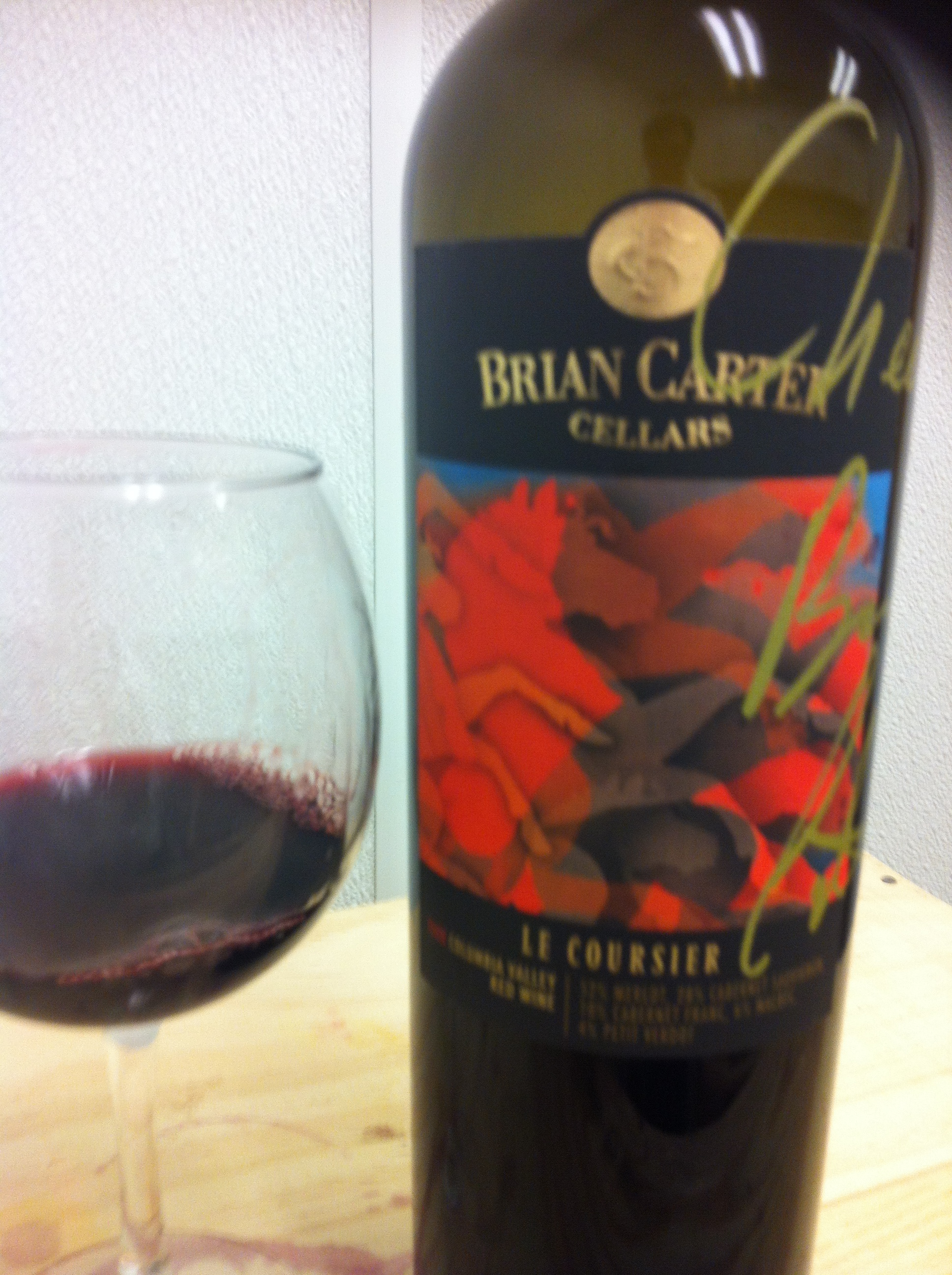
Bottle of Brian Carter wine, signed by the winemaker himself, a longtime resident of Woodinville wine country.

The Woodinville area developed as a farming and logging community along the Sammamish River Valley in the 1880s. Its close location to the major metropolitan area of Seattle as well as its natural wooded landscape and surroundings made it an inviting area for wineries to develop, with its first winery, Chateau Ste. Michelle, opening up in 1976. In 1988, Columbia Winery opened up across the street.

Chateau Ste. Michelle's decision to build in Woodinville was a catalyst for the development of this wine country. Founded in 1934, a group of investors bought the winery in 1974 and wanted to move the bulk of the sales and marketing operation to the western side of the Cascade Range where the majority of the state's population resides. The winery then split up its wine making facilities, bringing the white wine production to Woodinville. This decision was also facilitated by the difficult commute through the mountain passes to Eastern Washington during the winter months, after the grapes have been harvested and the wine needs to be monitored and observed for the development of wine faults. Today the winery and tasting room host over 200,000 visitors a year.

== Notable residents ==
Woodinville wine country is home to two Masters of wine, Joel Butler and Robert Betz. Within the United States, there are currently only 25 holders of this title. Until his death in 2009, Master of Wine David Lake also contributed to Woodinville wines.

== Events ==
Although many of the individual wineries host a number of events throughout the year, there are some annual events which involve multiple wineries.

The Passport to Woodinville event was held once a year, usually in April, from 2002 to 2014, and provided the public with an opportunity to sample many of the area wineries for a single tasting fee. Participants received a passport filled with labels and information, a glass, and the opportunity to tour many local wineries, some of which were not regularly open to the public. 2014 was the last year for Passport, dubbed "Passport: Last Call".

Passport was criticized for limiting people to visiting all of the wineries in a single weekend, which often led to public intoxication and an under-appreciation of the subtle differences in wine flavors. It also put a huge burden on wine tasting rooms, because of the crowds of people swarming the tasting rooms all at once.

In 2016, Passport to Woodinville was reinstated as a year-round event, rather than a single event on a particular weekend. For a yearly Passport fee of around $50–60, the buyer is granted a free tasting at all participating wineries listed in a red life-sized Passport book, which is stamped or signed by each winery to indicate that a free tasting has been redeemed. The new Passport is good at any participating winery during the entire year, except during busy weekends at a small number of select wineries. Because it is distributed year-round instead of concentrated in a single weekend, the new Passport to Woodinville has approximately twice as many participating wineries as the old one (around 60 vs 30).

The Saint Nicholas Day Open House is a similar event typically held during the first weekend in December.

== See also ==
- Washington wine
- Wine tourism
- Redhook Ale Brewery
