= Wilburton Trestle =

Former rail trestle in Bellevue, Washington

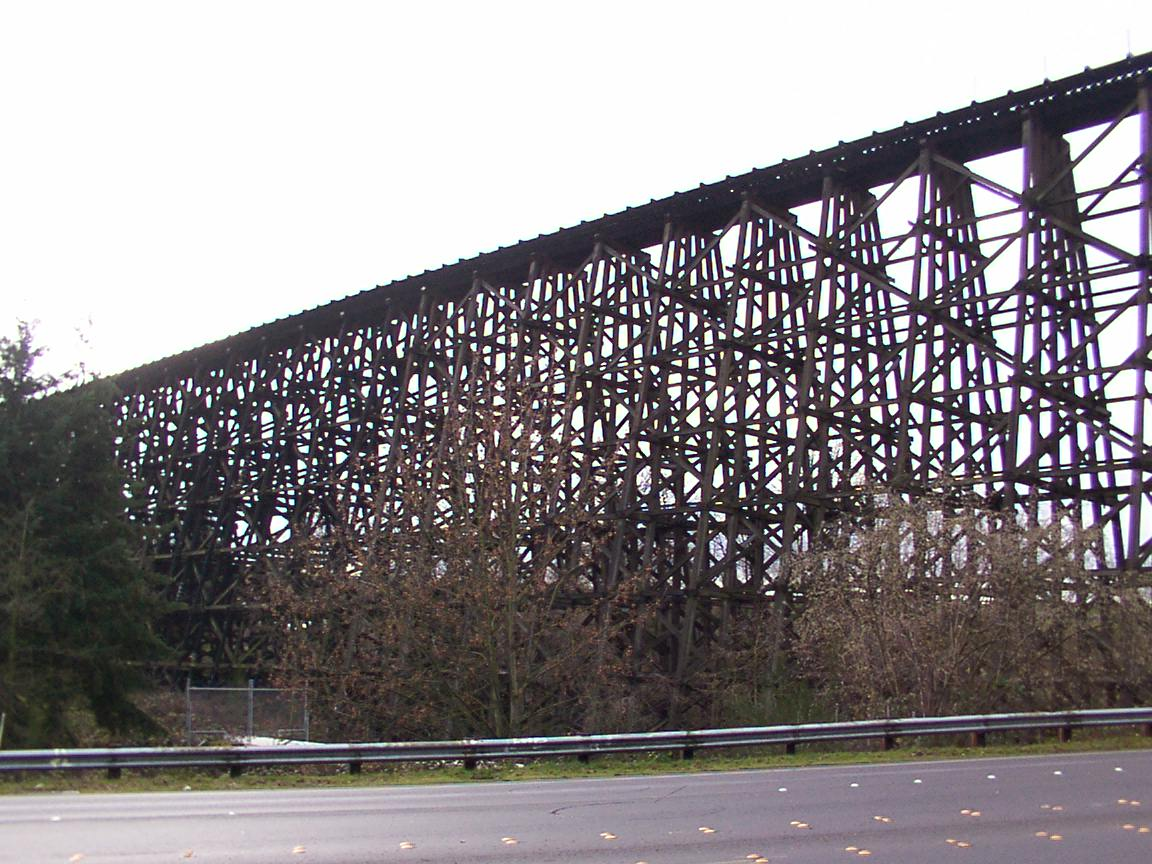
- Wilburton Trestle from the east
- Coordinates: 47.602647°N 122.181208°W
- Carries: Eastrail
- Crosses: Mercer Slough
- Locale: Bellevue, Washington, U.S.
- Maintained by: King County Department of Natural Resources and Parks

Characteristics
- Total length: 975 feet (297 m)
- Height: 102 feet (31 m)

History
- Opened: 1904

Location
- Interactive map of Wilburton Trestle

The Wilburton Trestle is a historic wooden railway trestle in Bellevue, Washington. Measuring 102 feet (31 m) high and 975 feet (297 m) long, it is the longest wooden trestle in the Pacific Northwest.

The trestle carried a single track of a former Northern Pacific branch line over a valley that used to be an extension of Lake Washington. The line ran approximately 40 miles (64 km) from Renton in the south to Snohomish in the north. Before the abandonment of the rail line by BNSF, freight trains ran six days a week, including those carrying Boeing's aircraft fuselages to its assembly plant in Renton from the Spring of 2001 until February 2008. It was also used daily by the popular Spirit of Washington Dinner Train, but this service ceased at the end of July 2007.

The trestle was originally completed in 1904 as part of the Northern Pacific Railway's Lake Washington Belt Line from Black River Junction (south of Seattle) to Woodinville. It was subsequently rebuilt four separate times, in 1913, 1924, 1934, and 1943, due to deterioration of the timber. In 1973, a road, the Lake Hills Connector, was cut through the trestle, replacing a short section with concrete piers and steel deck girders.

Wilburton Trestle saw its last regularly scheduled daily-except-Sunday passenger trains (Northern Pacific Nos. 445-446) on July 19, 1922. The train schedule was ended during a national railway strike and never resumed. Several Casey Jones excursion trains crossed the trestle in the 1950s and 1960s. The Spirit of Washington dinner train operated between Renton and Woodinville from May 1992 to July 31, 2007. The last train over the trestle was a BNSF freight carrying Boeing 737 fuselages to Renton, on February 26, 2008. In May 2008 BNSF sold the railway line to the Port of Seattle, which in turn later sold it to King County.

The trestle is a distinctive landmark noticed by travelers on Interstate 405 through Bellevue. While it is believed that this is the trestle pictured in the 1963 Elvis Presley movie It Happened at the World's Fair, further evidence indicates that that trestle was over the White River between Enumclaw and Buckley.

Wilburton Trestle should not be confused with Wilburton Tunnel, which was a tunnel for the southbound lanes of I-405 under the railroad. The tunnel was located about a quarter mile south of the trestle prior to its demolition on August 16, 2008 for freeway improvement and widening.

The trestle is planned to be rehabilitated with deck repairs and seismic upgrades to prepare for its use on the Eastrail pedestrian and bicycle trail network. Construction began in 2024 and is scheduled to be completed in 2027; it is estimated to cost $37 million with funding provided by a county levy, state carbon credits, and grants from Amazon and Kaiser Permanente.
