= Matthews Winery =

- Location: 16116 140th Pl NE, Woodinville, Washington, United States
- Coordinates: 47°44′37.72″N 122°8′44.43″W
- Wine region: Columbia Valley AVA
- Founded: 1993
- Varietals: Bordeaux grape varietals, Cabernet Sauvignon, Merlot, Cabernet Franc, Petit Verdot
- Website: matthewswinery.com

Matthews Winery is a winery near Woodinville, Washington, USA. It specializes in wines using the Bordeaux grape varietals: Cabernet Sauvignon, Merlot, Cabernet Franc, and Petit Verdot.

In 2016, the Matthews Claret made Wine Spectator's Top 100 List as the 27th best wine in the world.

== History ==
The winery was founded in 1993 by Matthew Loso. Loso served as head winemaker and owner until 2008, when Cliff and Diane Otis acquired the winery. Alex Stewart has been the Head Winemaker at the winery since 2021.

== Wines ==
Matthews makes two white wines — the Sauvignon Blanc and the Reserve Sauvignon Blanc. It also produces four separate Bordeaux-style red blends — the Claret, the Merlot, the Cabernet Sauvignon, and the Reserve Claret.
