= David Lake (winemaker) =

American winemaker

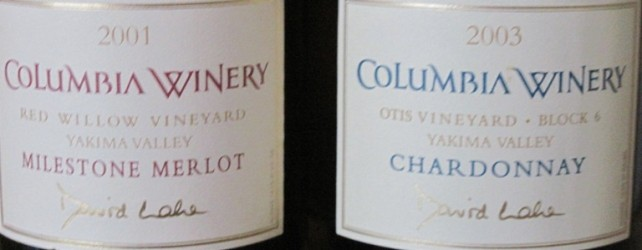
David Lake's signature was featured on his premium wines produced at Columbia.

David Lake (1943 – October 5, 2009) was a Washington winemaker and Master of Wine. Born in England to Canadian parents, Lake started in the wine industry working for a British wholesaler. In 1975 he earned his Master of Wine certification before traveling to the United States to enroll into the enology program of University of California-Davis. In 1978 he accepted a position of enologist with the Washington winery Associated Vintners (later renamed Columbia Winery) where he soon rose to the position of chief winemaker. Among Lake's accomplishments was releasing Washington's first single vineyard designated wines and making the states first Cabernet franc, Syrah and Pinot gris wines. He was the first US winemaker to hold a Master of Wine accreditation.

== Career ==
After working in the British wholesale wine industry, David Lake earned his Master of Wine accreditation in 1975. He moved to the west coast of the United States where he enrolled in the enology program at the University of California, Davis. Upon completion of his studies, Lake spent a brief time in the Dundee Hills AVA of Oregon working for Eyrie Vineyards under winemaker David Lett. He also worked briefly in the Eola-Amity Hills AVA for Bethel Heights Vineyard and Amity Vineyards. From there he joined the Woodinville-based winery of Associated Vintners (soon to be known as Columbia Winery). In the early 1980s, Lake pioneered the practice of producing vineyard designated wines when he released Cabernet Sauvignon from the Yakima Valley vineyards of Otis, Red Willow and Sagemoor. Working with Mike Sauer, owner and lead viticulturalist of the Red Willow Vineyard, Lake encouraged the plantings of the first Syrah vines in Washington. Noting similarities between the Red Willow vineyard and the La Chapelle vineyard of the Hermitage AOC in Rhone, Lake arranged for Syrah cuttings to be imported into the state and produced Washington's first Syrah in 1988. By 2009, Syrah would grow to be the third most widely planted red wine grape variety in Washington State.

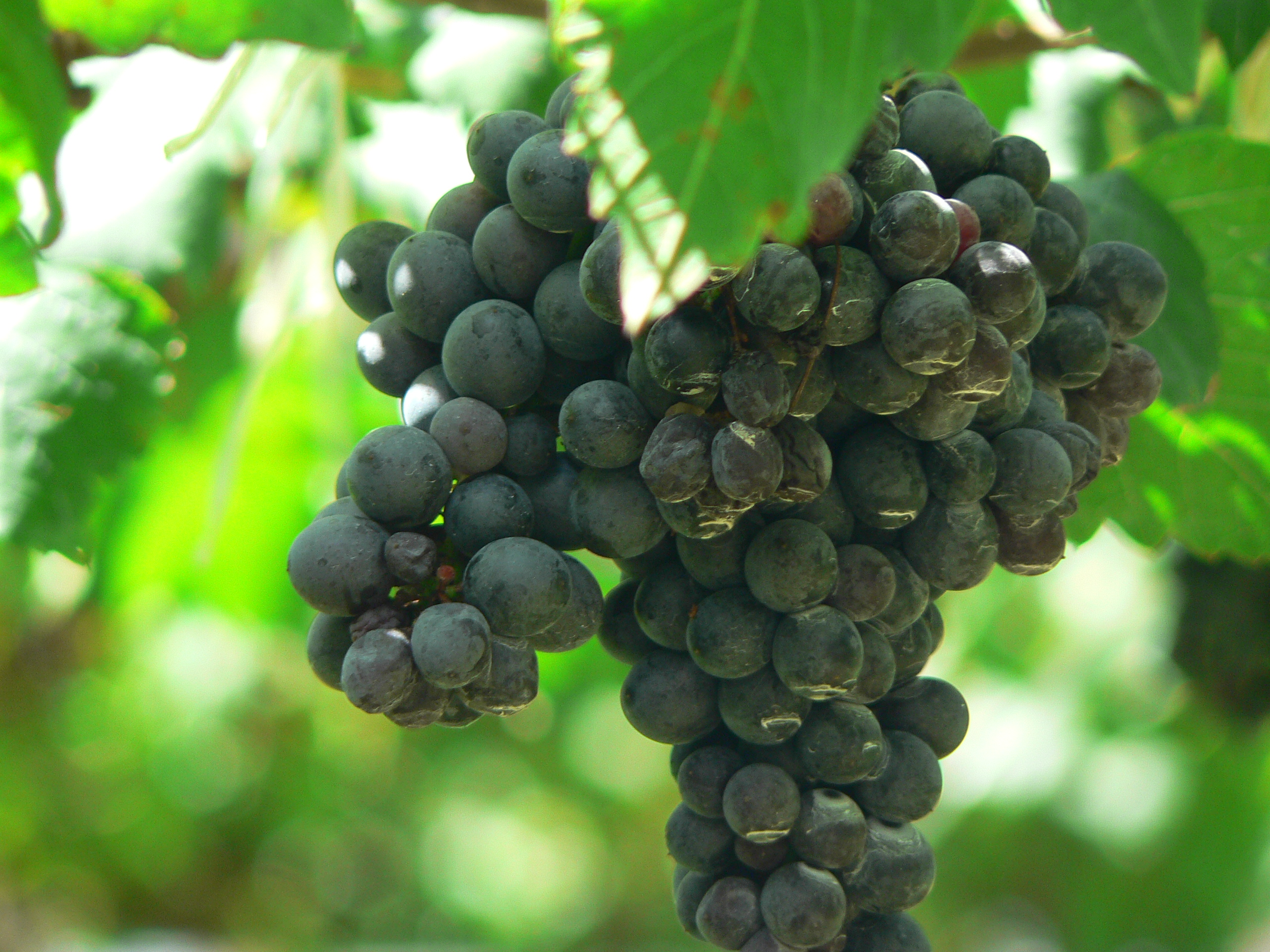
David Lake pioneered the first plantings of Syrah in Washington State.

Through his career, David Lake would promote or pioneer Washington production of a wide range of grape varieties including Merlot, Viognier, Pinot gris and Cabernet franc. Among his many accomplishments, he was the first in Washington to blend Merlot and Cabernet Franc in a style similar to the Right bank of Bordeaux. David Lake's winemaking style was often described by wine experts, such as writer Paul Gregutt, as "European"-producing wines with moderate oak influence and alcohol levels.

== Illness and death ==
Following the 2005 vintage, David Lake began to experience a variety of health problems, including back issues that required surgery, that prompted his retirement from Columbia Winery. After battles with heart disease and cancer, Lake collapsed in his Issaquah, Washington home on October 5, 2009 and died hours later.
