= Woodinville, Washington =

Woodinville
- City
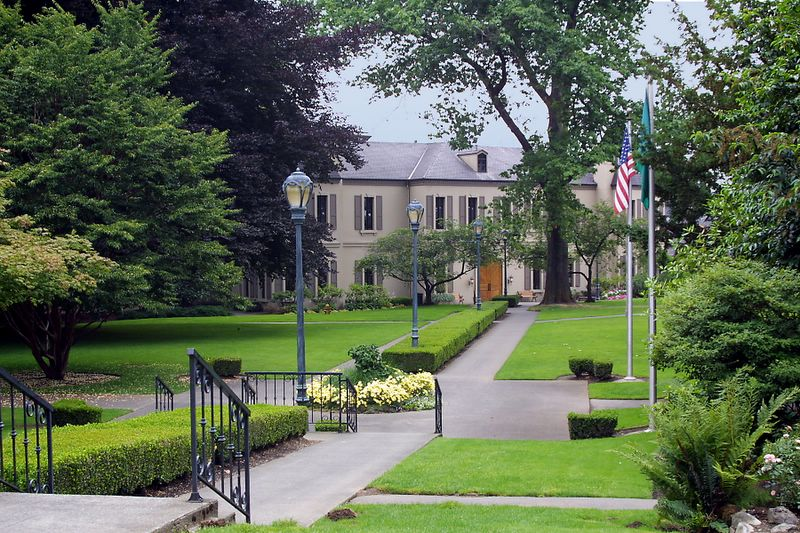
- Chateau Ste. Michelle winery in Woodinville

- Logo
- Interactive location map of Woodinville
- Coordinates: 47°45′09″N 122°08′35″W
- Country: United States
- State: Washington
- County: King
- Platted: 1890
- Incorporated: March 31, 1993

Government
  - Type: Council–manager
  - Mayor: Sarah Arndt

Area
  - Total: 5.63 sq mi (14.58 km^{2})
  - Land: 5.61 sq mi (14.54 km^{2})
  - Water: 0.015 sq mi (0.04 km^{2})
- Elevation: 174 ft (53 m)

Population (2020)
  - Total: 13,069
  - Estimate (2022): 13,261
  - Density: 2,362.2/sq mi (912.06/km^{2})
- Time zone: UTC-8 (Pacific (PST))
  - Summer (DST): UTC-7 (PDT)
- ZIP Code: 98072 and 98077
- Area code: 425
- FIPS code: 53-79590
- GNIS feature ID: 2412298
- Website: www.woodinville.gov

Woodinville is a city in King County, Washington, United States. The population was 13,069 at the 2020 census. It is a part of the Seattle metropolitan area and is east of Bothell. Woodinville has waterfront parks on the Sammamish River, a winery district, and industrial areas along State Route 522.

== History ==
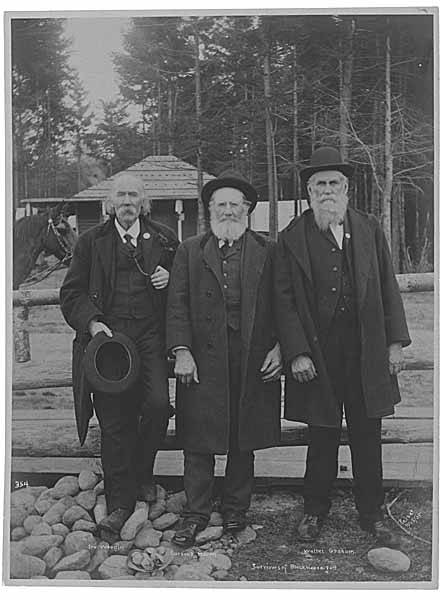
Ira Woodin (left) with Carson D. Boren and Walter Graham (for whom the Graham Hill area is named) in 1905

The area along the Sammamish River, including modern-day Woodinville, is the historic territory of the indigenous Sammamish people. Other Coast Salish peoples also occupied and used the lands in the area, including a Duwamish subgroup known as the "willow people".

In 1871, Ira Woodin and his wife Susan moved from Seattle and traveled up the Sammamish River where they built a cabin. They planned to log timber and farm cattle. A town gradually developed around them. Their cabin served as its first school and post office, with Susan Woodin appointed as postmaster. Woodin and his son-in-law Thomas Sanders set up the first general store.

Like other nearby towns, Woodinville began as a logging community and became a farming center in the early decades of the 20th century. After World War II, it developed as a suburb of Seattle. In 1969, rock bands including Led Zeppelin and The Guess Who performed at the Seattle Pop Festival at Woodinville's Gold Creek Park.

The community sought either incorporation as a city or annexation by neighboring Bothell in the 1970s to improve services. A later attempt by Bothell to annex portions of Woodinville in 1985 was halted but inspired an incorporation campaign. The residents of Woodinville voted for incorporation on May 19, 1992, the third attempt at becoming a city; a previous attempt had been rejected by a margin of 14 votes. Woodinville was officially incorporated on March 27, 1993.

In the late 1990s, Woodinville attempted to annex the adjacent community of Grace in Snohomish County. The county's government and the State Boundary Review Board rejected the proposal, citing the loss of tax revenue and legal issues with providing policing due to Woodinville's contracts with the King County Sheriff's Office. The area was also considered for a branch campus of the University of Washington that was ultimately built in Bothell.

== Geography ==
Woodinville is located east of Bothell and northeast of Kirkland in northern King County. According to the United States Census Bureau, the city has a total area of 5.62 square miles (14.56 km^{2}), of which, 5.60 square miles (14.50 km^{2}) is land and 0.02 square miles (0.05 km^{2}) is water.

=== Neighborhoods ===
The city government has defined eleven geographic neighborhoods within the Woodinville city limits:

- East Wellington
- Lower West Ridge
- North Industrial – a mix of light industry and commercial developments east of Highway 522, extending towards the former community of Grace
- Reinwood Leota
- Tourist District
- Town Center
- Upper West Ridge
- Valley Industrial
- Wedge
- West Wellington
- Woodinville Heights

== Demographics ==
Historical population
Census	Pop.	Note	%±
1990	7,479		—
2000	9,194		22.9%
2010	10,938		19.0%
2020	13,069		19.5%
2022 (est.)	13,261		1.5%
U.S. Decennial Census; 1960 1970 1980 1990; 2000 2010

Woodinville first appeared as a census designated place in the 1990 U.S. census. Prior to the 2000 U.S. census, the majority was incorporated into the city of Woodinville and part was used to form the CDP of Cottage Lake.

=== 2020 census ===
As of the 2020 census, Woodinville had a population of 13,069. The median age was 38.9 years. 21.6% of residents were under the age of 18 and 14.2% of residents were 65 years of age or older. For every 100 females there were 95.0 males, and for every 100 females age 18 and over there were 92.7 males age 18 and over.

100.0% of residents lived in urban areas, while 0.0% lived in rural areas.

There were 5,468 households in Woodinville, of which 30.2% had children under the age of 18 living in them. Of all households, 51.4% were married-couple households, 17.1% were households with a male householder and no spouse or partner present, and 25.0% were households with a female householder and no spouse or partner present. About 29.7% of all households were made up of individuals and 11.2% had someone living alone who was 65 years of age or older.

There were 5,895 housing units, of which 7.2% were vacant. The homeowner vacancy rate was 0.9% and the rental vacancy rate was 12.6%.

Racial composition as of the 2020 census
Race	Number	Percent
White	8,816	67.5%
Black or African American	231	1.8%
American Indian and Alaska Native	64	0.5%
Asian	2,065	15.8%
Native Hawaiian and Other Pacific Islander	16	0.1%
Some other race	440	3.4%
Two or more races	1,437	11.0%
Hispanic or Latino (of any race)	1,136	8.7%

=== 2010 census ===
As of the 2010 census, there were 10,938 people, 4,478 households, and 2,827 families residing in the city. The population density was 1,953.2 inhabitants per square mile (754.1/km^{2}). There were 4,996 housing units at an average density of 892.1 per square mile (344.4/km^{2}). The racial makeup of the city was 80.2% White, 1.4% African American, 0.4% Native American, 11.2% Asian, 0.2% Pacific Islander, 2.6% from other races, and 4.0% from two or more races. Hispanic or Latino of any race were 7.3% of the population.

There were 4,478 households, of which 32.2% had children under the age of 18 living with them, 51.9% were married couples living together, 8.2% had a female householder with no husband present, 3.0% had a male householder with no wife present, and 36.9% were non-families. 30.2% of all households were made up of individuals, and 10.4% had someone living alone who was 65 years of age or older. The average household size was 2.43 and the average family size was 3.07.

The median age in the city was 38.9 years. 23.7% of residents were under the age of 18; 7.1% were between the ages of 18 and 24; 29.4% were from 25 to 44; 28.7% were from 45 to 64; and 11.1% were 65 years of age or older. The gender makeup of the city was 48.7% male and 51.3% female.

=== 2000 census ===
The median income for a household in the city in 2000 was $68,114, and the median income for a family was $81,251. Males had a median income of $53,214 versus $35,404 for females. The per capita income for the city was $31,458. 4.4% of the population and 2.7% of families were below the poverty line. 4.7% of those under the age of 18 and 1.9% of those 65 and older were living below the poverty line.

Based on per capita income, one of the more reliable measures of affluence, Woodinville ranked 34th of 522 areas in the state of Washington to be ranked by the 2000 Census.

== Economy ==
Woodinville's economy is a mix of light industrial, retail, and tourism. The city and the surrounding area has approximately 130 wineries and tasting rooms that showcase wines from grapes grown in Eastern Washington. The wineries in the "Woodinville wine country" include Chateau Ste. Michelle, which also hosts a summer concert series, DeLille Cellars, and Matthews Winery.

From 1992 to 2007, the Spirit of Washington Dinner Train traveled from Renton to the Columbia Winery in Woodinville. The service was moved to Tacoma and later ceased operations. At the time of the shutdown, the operator had proposed extending the dinner train service north from Woodinville to Snohomish.

== Arts and culture ==
Civic events include Celebrate Woodinville Summer Concerts and Festival, and Celebrate Woodinville Winterfest.

=== City landmarks ===
The City of Woodinville has designated the following landmarks:

Landmark	Built	Listed	Address	Photo
Hollywood Farm	1910	1983	14111 NE 145th Street	
Hollywood Schoolhouse	1912	1992	14810 NE 145th Street	
Woodinville School	1936	2001	17301 133rd Avenue NE	

== Government ==
Presidential elections results
Year	Republican	Democratic	Third Parties
2020	26.79% 2,034	70.03% 5,317	3.17% 241

=== Police ===
Woodinville contracts with the King County Sheriff's Office for law enforcement services. Deputies assigned to Woodinville wear city uniforms and drive patrol cars marked with the city logo. There are currently nine patrol officers, one school resource officer, one sergeant and one chief assigned full-time to the city.

== Education ==
Most of Woodinville is served by the Northshore School District; however, the extreme southwestern portions of the city lie within the Lake Washington School District. To serve the city, Northshore School District has one high school (Woodinville High School), two middle schools, and six elementary schools. Lake Washington School District has two elementary schools that serve some Woodinville neighborhoods.

In addition to public schools, the city has several private schools and alternative education options, including a Montessori school, a branch of the Bellevue Christian School, and the Chrysalis School.

== Infrastructure ==
=== Transportation ===
The Woodinville Subdivision, a spur railroad operated by BNSF Railway, was used for freight and occasional passenger use until it was decommissioned in 2008. The Spirit of Washington Dinner Train, serving the Columbia Winery, ran until July 31, 2007. The railroad was acquired by the Port of Seattle in 2009 and sold to various local governments for use as a regional pedestrian and cyclist trail, known as the Eastside Rail Corridor or Eastrail. The corridor was also proposed for use by a commuter rail service to connect Woodinville to Bellevue and other Eastside destinations, but was determined to be too costly.

Woodinville is served by King County Metro and Sound Transit Express buses with a hub at a park-and-ride lot in downtown.

== Notable people ==
- Alicia Barker, soccer player
- Ethan Bartlow, soccer player
- Bruce Bochte, former first baseman and left fielder for the Seattle Mariners and Oakland Athletics.
- Brooke Butler, film and television actress
- Paul Christensen, soccer player
- Michael Conforto, professional baseball player
- J.P. Crawford, shortstop for the Seattle Mariners
- Andre Dillard, professional American football player
- Bud Ericksen, American football player and former Bothell mayor
- Anu Garg, author and speaker
- Caleb Hamilton, professional baseball player
- Alma Mana'o, soccer player who represented the American Samoa women's national team
- Peg Phillips, actress (most well-known for Northern Exposure) and founder of the Woodinville Repertory Theatre
- Richard Sanders, actor and writer best known for playing news director Les Nessman on WKRP in Cincinnati.
- Kelly Tanner, racing driver
- Cooper Tomlinson, writer and actor, most known for his role as Ian in Obsession
- Marques Tuiasosopo, former NFL quarterback and assistant college football coach
- Marah Wagner, professional hockey player
- Marc Wilson, former NFL quarterback previously lived in Woodinville
- Nancy Wilson, musician and guitarist of the band Heart

== See also ==
- Woodinville wine country
- Paradise Lake (Washington)
