= Chateau Ste. Michelle =

American winery

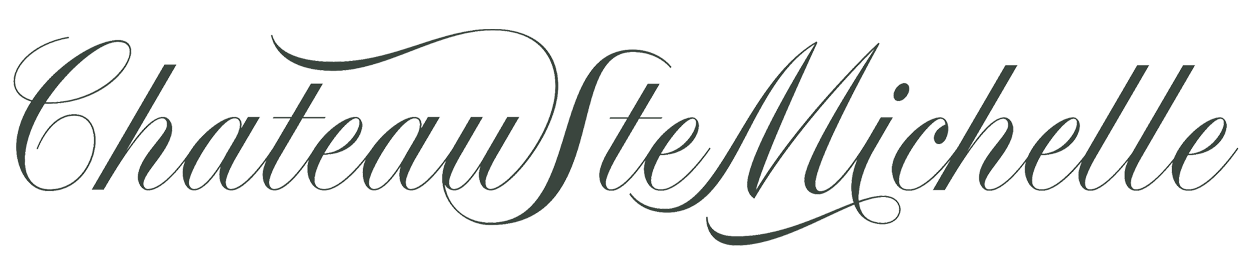
- Location: Woodinville, Washington, United States
- Coordinates: 47°43′43.74″N 122°9′0.42″W
- Appellation: Columbia Valley AVA
- Formerly: American Wine Company
- Founded: 1954; 72 years ago
- Key people: Bob Bertheau, winemaker
- Parent company: Wyckoff family
- Cases/yr: >2,000,000
- Known for: Eroica Riesling
- Varietals: Cabernet Sauvignon, Malbec, Merlot, Syrah, Chardonnay, Chenin blanc, Pinot gris, Riesling, Sauvignon blanc, Gewurztraminer
- Distribution: International
- Tasting: Open to the public
- Website: ste-michelle.com

Chateau Ste. Michelle is a winery in Woodinville, Washington, United States, 20 miles (32 km) east of Seattle. It is the state's oldest winery and produces Chardonnay, Cabernet, Merlot, and Riesling, and has winemaking partnerships with two vintners: Col Solare is an alliance with Tuscany's Piero Antinori and Eroica Riesling is a partnership with the Mosel's Ernst Loosen. Chateau Ste. Michelle was selected as Wine Enthusiast magazine's 2004 American Winery of the Year. It was owned by Altria (formerly known as Phillip Morris), and then sold to the private equity firm Sycamore Partners in 2021, who sold it to the Wyckoff family in December, 2025.

== History ==
Chateau Ste. Michelle is the oldest winery in Washington state. It was founded as the American Wine Company, a 1954 merger of the National Wine Company (NAWICO), founded in 1934, and the Pomerelle Wine Company. (For years, there was a large neon sign advertising NAWICO in Seattle's Wallingford neighborhood.) The French-style chateau is located on 118 acres (48 ha) of land with mature trees that once belonged to lumber baron Frederick Stimson, who used it as a hunting retreat and rural working farm called the Hollywood Farm. Chateau Ste. Michelle acquired the property in 1976; it was added to the National Register of Historic Places in 1978.

Over the years, many Washington winemakers have gotten their start working for Chateau Ste. Michelle, these include Kay Simon of Chinook Wines, which she co-founded with her husband Clay Mackey who also worked as a vineyard manager for Chateau Ste. Michelle.

Ste. Michelle Wine Estates was sold to Sycamore Partners, a private equity firm, in 2021 for $1.2 billion. Under their new ownership, the company moved its wine production out of the Woodinville property, which it briefly put up for sale in 2022 before cancelling plans. In 2024, Chateau Ste. Michelle proposed a redevelopment of its Woodinville property that would include 90 single-family homes, a 120-room hotel, a new music venue, and stores. The redevelopment would require a revised zoning designation, which remains industrial use, from the city government. The music venue is planned to accommodate up to 5,800 total spectators, including 4,300 in seats, and would require an additional 1,322 parking stalls.

=== 2025 acquisition by Wyckoff family ===
In December 2025, it was announced that Washington’s Wyckoff family had acquired Ste. Michelle Wine Estates from Sycamore Partners. The sale included all of Ste. Michelle’s wine brands, production facilities, and vineyards in Washington State. The acquisition marked the first time in more than fifty years that Ste. Michelle has returned to local ownership.

== Wines ==
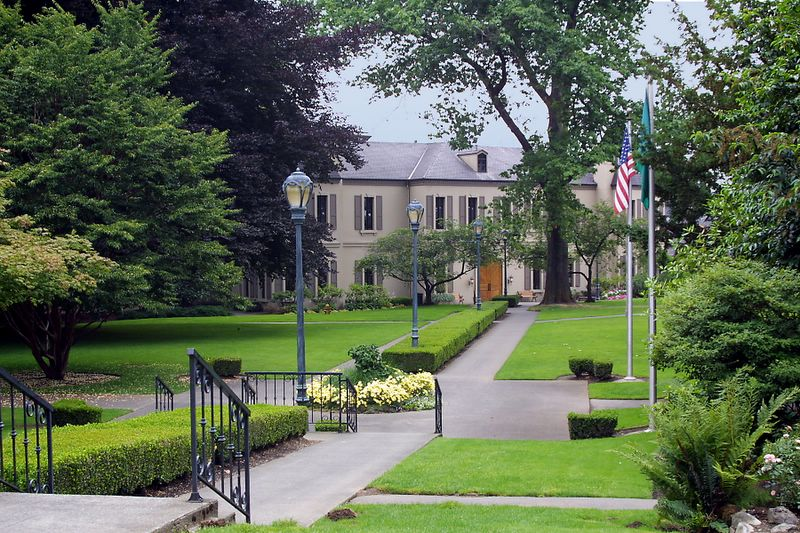
The grounds of Chateau Ste. Michelle in Woodinville wine country.

Chateau Ste. Michelle produces over 600,000 cases of Riesling wine per year. The winery owns several estate vineyards in Eastern Washington including the Canoe Ridge vineyard in the Horse Heaven Hills AVA, the Cold Creek vineyard and Indian Wells vineyards in the Columbia Valley AVA.

With the 2022 harvest, Chateau Ste. Michelle moved its white wine production from Woodinville to its facilities in eastern Washington to reduce freight trips and use of diesel fuel.

== Activities ==
On the grounds of the winery is an amphitheater where outdoor concerts are performed in the summer.

== See also ==
- Woodinville wine country
