= Columbia Winery =

Winery in Washington state, US

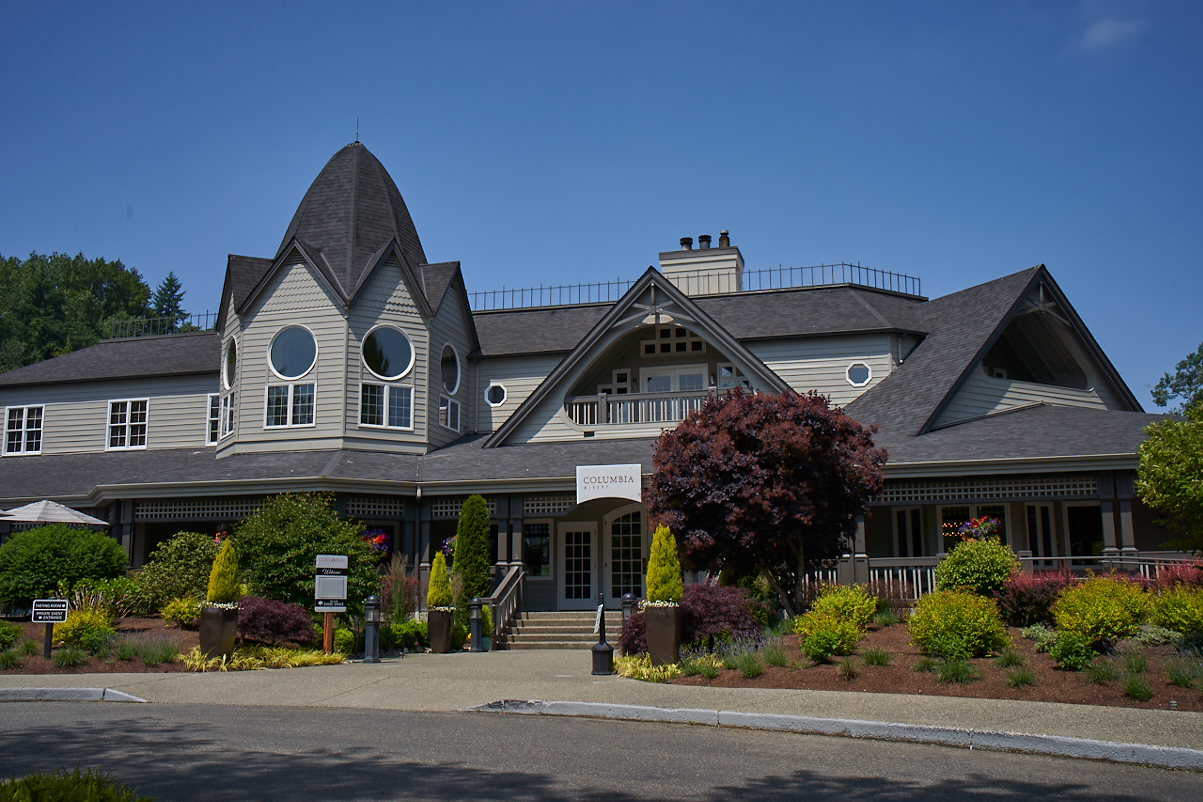
- Location: Woodinville, Washington, United States
- Appellation: Columbia Valley AVA
- Formerly: Associated Vintners
- Founded: 1964
- Parent company: E & J Gallo Winery
- Varietals: Cabernet Franc, Pinot gris, Syrah, Cabernet Sauvignon, Malbec, Merlot, Sangiovese, Viognier, Chardonnay
- Distribution: National
- Tasting: Open Daily
- Website: www.columbiawinery.com

Columbia Winery is a Washington state winery formerly located in Woodinville, Washington. The winery is currently owned by E & J Gallo Winery. The winery was founded in 1962 as Associated Vinters by several former professors at the University of Washington. In 1979, the winery hired David Lake as head winemaker and under his stewardship, Columbia Winery was the first winery in the state of the Washington to produce varietal wines of Cabernet Franc, Pinot gris and Syrah. In 1983, the winery released wines under its current name. In 1988, the winery moved to its former location in Woodinville wine country. Due to failing health, David Lake retired from Columbia in 2006. In 2006, Kerry Norton (formerly of Covey Run Winery was hired as Director of Winemaking. In June 2008, Columbia Winery (along with Covey Run Winery and other Constellation Brands wines) were sold by Constellation Brands to newly formed Ascentia Wine Estates, which in turn sold Columbia to Gallo in 2012. The Woodinville tasting room closed at the end of 2022.

== Vineyards ==
Columbia Winery harvests grapes from several vineyards in Eastern Washington including:

- Red Willow Vineyard-Yakima Valley AVA. At 1,300 feet (400 m) above sea level, this is the highest vineyard in the Yakima Valley. Planted with Cabernet Franc, Cabernet Sauvignon, Malbec, Merlot, Sangiovese, Syrah, and Viognier.
- Otis Vineyard-Rattlesnake Hills AVA. First vineyard in Washington state planted with Pinot gris, and home to the oldest currently producing Cabernet Sauvignon vines.
- Wyckoff Vineyards-Rattlesnake Hills AVA. Planted with Chardonnay.

== See also ==
- Washington wine
