= Vineyard designated wine =

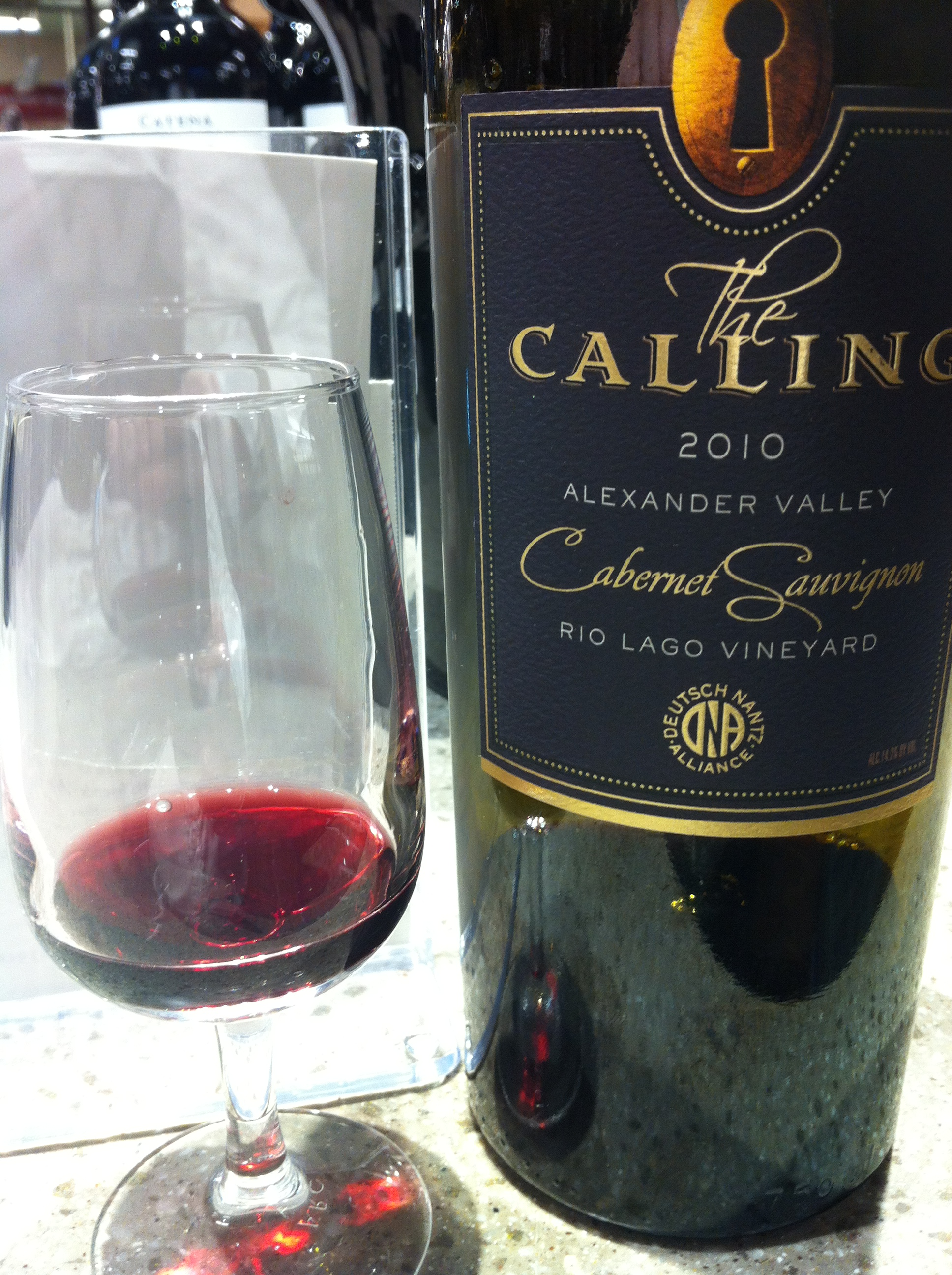
A vineyard designated Cabernet Sauvignon from the Rio Lago Vineyard in the Alexander Valley region of Sonoma Valley, California.

A vineyard designated wine is a wine produced from the product of a single vineyard with that vineyard's name appearing on the wine label.

Throughout the history of winemaking and viticulture, the differences in quality between one plot of land and another have been observed with the boundaries of these vineyard generally well demarcated. In Burgundy, the vineyards of the area are classified with the highest quality vineyards receiving the ranking of Grand cru. The names of these vineyards, such as Montrachet, will often appear on the wine label of Burgundy wines in bolder, more prominent print than even the name of the producer.

In the United States, the appearance of vineyards name on wine labels is a relatively recent phenomenon with one of the first vineyard designated premium wines in California being the 1966 vintage Heitz Martha's Vineyard Cabernet Sauvignon. Later examples include the 1975 Robert Young Vineyard Chardonnay from the Sonoma wine estate of Chateau St. Jean. On the East Coast, Unionville Vineyards produces single vineyard wines, primarily Chardonnay. Under US wine laws, if the name of vineyard appears on the label at least 95% of the grapes used to make the wine must come from that vineyard.
