= Yellow Lake =

Yellow Lake may refer to:

- Yellow Lake (Michigan), a lake
- Yellow Lake (New York), a lake
- Yellow Lake (Sammamish, Washington), a lake
- Yellow Lake, Wisconsin, an unincorporated community
- Yellow Lake (Wisconsin), a lake
- Taal Volcano Main Crater Lake, historically known as Yellow Lake
