= 2020–2022 Taal Volcano eruptions =

Volcanic eruptions in the Philippines

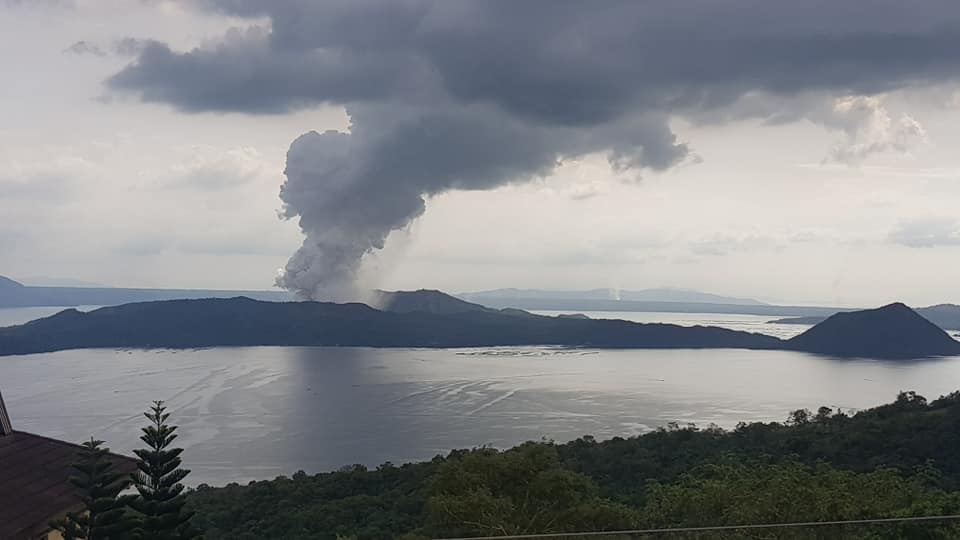
- The January 12, 2020 eruption
- Volcano: Taal Volcano
- Date: January 12, 2020 – March 31, 2022 (2 years, 2 months, 2 weeks and 5 days): First eruption: January 12–22, 2020; Second eruption: July 1–9, 2021; Third eruption: November 15–22, 2021; Fourth eruption: March 26–31, 2022
- Type: Phreatomagmatic, Phreatic, Plinian
- Location: Batangas, Calabarzon, Philippines; 14°00′38″N 120°59′52″E
- VEI: 4 (January 2020 eruption); 3 (July 2021 – March 2022 eruptions)
- Impact: 39 dead (only 1 direct, 38 indirect)

Maps
- Map of Batangas highlighting the areas under the 14-kilometer radius danger zone

Taal Volcano in Batangas, Philippines began to erupt on January 12, 2020, when a phreatomagmatic eruption from its main crater spewed ashes over Calabarzon, Metro Manila, and some parts of Central Luzon and Ilocos Region, resulting in the suspension of school classes, work schedules, and flights in the area, as well as temporarily drying up Taal Main Crater Lake and destroying Vulcan Point, an Island surrounded by the lake. The Philippine Institute of Volcanology and Seismology (PHIVOLCS) subsequently issued an Alert Level 4, indicating "that a hazardous explosive eruption is possible within hours to days." Volcanic activity continued into 2021, when smaller eruptions occurred in July 2021. On March 26, 2022, a short-lived phreatomagmatic eruption was recorded by PHIVOLCS raising the status from Alert level 2 to Alert level 3.

== Volcanic activity ==
=== 2020 eruption ===
Phreatic activity leading up to the first explosive event captured at the main crater of Taal Volcano. Video taken from the installed IP camera of PHIVOLCS monitoring Taal Volcano

The volcano erupted on the afternoon of January 12, 2020, 43 years after its previous eruption in 1977. According to PHIVOLCS director Dr. Renato Solidum, seismic swarms began at 11 am and were later followed by a phreatic eruption from Volcano Island Main Crater at around 1 pm Philippine Standard Time (UTC+8). Loud rumbling sounds were also felt and heard from the volcano island. By 2:30 pm, PHIVOLCS raised the alert status to Alert Level 2, although PHIVOLCS through its Taal Volcano Observatory had advised residents of Volcano Island to evacuate at around 1 pm. Stronger explosions began around 3 pm that spewed an ash column exceeding a kilometer high, prompting PHIVOLCS to upgrade the alert status to Alert Level 3 by 4 pm. Furthermore, PHIVOLCS Director Renato Solidum Jr. confirmed that there was a magmatic intrusion that was driving the volcano's unrest. PHIVOLCS advised evacuation of the towns of Balete, San Nicolas, and Talisay in Batangas and other towns within the shores of Taal Lake. By 7:30 pm, PHIVOLCS upgraded the alert status to Alert Level 4 after volcanic activities intensified as "continuous eruption generated a tall 10 to 15 kilometres (6.2 to 9.3 mi) steam-laden tephra column with frequent volcanic lightning that rained wet ashfall on the general north as far as Quezon City and Caloocan." Ashfall from the volcano were also experienced in Cavite and Laguna, and reached as far as Metro Manila and Pampanga.

Explosion seen from the Tagaytay City viewdeck. Part of this full video.

On January 13, PHIVOLCS reported that the activity on its main crater had transitioned into lava fountaining between 2:48 am to 4:28 am. A lava fountain was recorded at 3:20 am. The Department of Environment and Natural Resources (DENR) presented a study that the air quality index of cities in Metro Manila had worsened; Mandaluyong had the highest amount of inhalable coarse particulate matter (PM_{10}) with 118, followed by Las Piñas (108) and Taguig (104), all of which were "considered unhealthy for sensitive groups" with respiratory issues. Meanwhile, the cities with the least amount of PM_{10} were San Juan and Malabon, both with "good" amounts of 22 and 28 respectively. These were followed by "moderate/fair" amounts of PM_{10} in Pasig (55), Parañaque (62) and Makati (63).

By January 15, PHIVOLCS reported that the slightly acidic lake which filled the main crater prior to the eruption had dried up, which was after confirmed by European satellite observations.

=== 2021 ===
Eruption of Taal Volcano on July 1, 2021

In February 2021, after over a year of the 2020 eruption, the Batangas provincial government ordered residents from Taal Volcano Island to be preemptively evacuated due to the volcano's increasing activity. On March 9, PHIVOLCS raised the volcano's alert level to number 2 and said that it is showing signs of an "increased unrest".

In late June, localities near the volcano experienced volcanic smog or vog caused by the volcano's emission of sulfur dioxide, amounting to 14,326 tonnes on June 28. The vog was confirmed to have reached as far as the Central Luzon region.

On July 1, the volcano erupted at around 3:16 p.m. local time and lasted for five minutes, and the alert level was raised from level 2 to level 3. The volcano had several smaller eruptions later that day. On July 4, PHIVOLCS reported Taal Volcano's highest sulfur dioxide emission on record. By July 7, the volcano had a short-lived phreatomagmatic eruption occurred in the Main Crater at 5:18 a.m. local time and generated a grayish plume that rose 300 meters high before drifting southeast. This was followed by a phreatomagmatic burst and weak eruption at 8:47 a.m. for seven minutes, which generated another 300-meter-high plume. Two more phreatomagmatic events were recorded by PHIVOLCS at 9:15 a.m. and 9:26 a.m., lasting for two minutes and five minutes. Another phreatomagmatic burst occurred at 11:56 a.m., which generated a 200-meter-high dark gray plume. Six short-lived phreatomagmatic eruptions were recorded in Taal on Wednesday alone, the latest being at 9:41 p.m., the report added, citing Paolo Reniva of the Taal Volcano Observatory. Also on July 8, another short-lived phreatomagmatic eruption occurred in the Main Crater at 6:47 am local time and generated a 200-meter grayish plume. This was followed by three more phreatomagmatic bursts at 6:06 p.m., 9:21 p.m. and 9:50 p.m. On July 9, another phreatomagmatic burst occurred at 2:59 a.m. On July 23, PHIVOLCS lowered the alert level status from Alert Level 3 to Level 2.

After several months of continued unrest, series of 2 short-lived phreatomagmatic eruptions were recorded on several thermal webcams nearby at 1:46 a.m. and at 2:54 a.m. on November 17, 2021. There is also a chance there was another short-lived eruption a few days prior to the eruptions on the 17th.

=== 2022 ===
Video in crater from March 26, 2022, eruption

Between January 29 and 30, 2022, the volcano had nine phreatomagmatic bursts on its main crater.

On March 26, PHIVOLCS raised the volcano's alert level status to Alert Level 3 due to a short lived-phreatomagmatic eruption with the evacuation of around 1,100 residents around the area and surrounding towns. Two phreatomagmatic events were recorded in which it emitted toxic plumes of 800 meters and 400 meters. Locals have then reported an explosion near the crater around 1:00 pm (Philippine Time) with subsequent spurs of ashes around the lake. High level toxic emissions have been recorded as well as 14 volcanic earthquakes and 10 volcanic tremors within the day. The next day on March 27, volcanic activities were relatively tranquil with almost no recorded earthquakes although sulfur dioxide emission still measured at 1,140 tonnes.

On April 9, PHIVOLCS downgraded again the alert level status from Level 3 to Level 2.

== Seismic activity ==
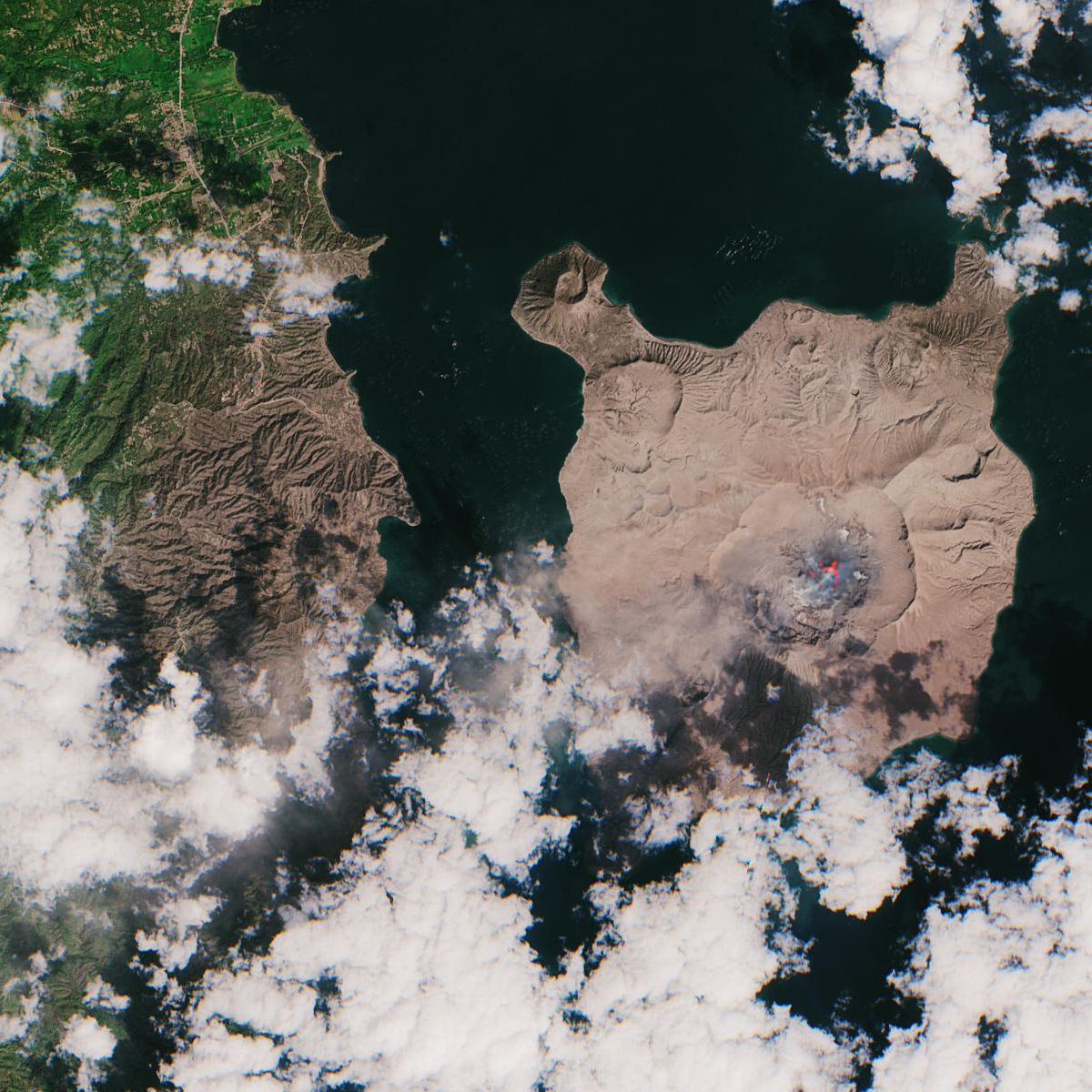
Copernicus Sentinel-2 image of Taal Volcano on January 23, 2020, showing magmatic activity and the ash-blanketed towns of Agoncillo and Laurel.

On February 13, 2020, the National Disaster Risk Reduction and Management Council (NDRRMC) and the Philippine Institute of Volcanology and Seismology (PHIVOLCS) have reported a total of 2,484 volcano tectonic earthquakes on the vicinity of the volcano since the eruption, 176 of which were felt. The strongest were a series of M_{w}4.1 magnitude earthquakes originating 6 kilometers (3.7 mi) northwest of Agoncillo, Batangas, which were recorded at least thrice: at 11:56 pm on January 12, 3:11 am on January 13, and 6:35 am later that day. As a result, an Intensity III ("weak") on the PHIVOLCS Earthquake Intensity Scale was felt in Tagaytay and an Intensity II ("slightly felt") was felt in Malabon. Between 11:39 pm on January 13, 2020, and 5:50 am the following day, PHIVOLCS reported a total of 44 earthquakes in the towns of Calaca, Laurel, Lemery, Mataasnakahoy, San Luis, Taal and Talisay in Batangas, and Alfonso in Cavite; among the strongest were a magnitude M_{w} 3.6 in Taal, which was felt at an Intensity III in Tagaytay, and a magnitude M_{w} 3.9 originating 7 kilometres (4.3 mi) northeast of Talisay at 2:05 am, measuring an Intensity IV ("moderately strong") in Tagaytay and Intensity II in Malabon and Pasay.

As a result of these constant earthquakes, numerous fissures or cracks appeared across different barangays in the Batangas towns of Agoncillo, Lemery, San Nicolas, and Talisay, the towns within the 14-kilometer radius danger zone of Taal. A fissure also transected the road connecting Agoncillo to Laurel. On January 15, PHIVOLCS reported that the water in Main Crater Lake on Volcano Island had drained; the lake measured 1.9 kilometers wide and 4 metres (13 ft) above sea level. Portions of the Pansipit River had also drained as a result of "the ground deformation caused by an upward movement of the magma"; it was the same process that caused the series of earthquakes. PHIVOLCS have also hinted at the possible existence of underwater fissures in Taal Lake into which the water may have drained.

By January 27, from 5 am until January 28, only 3 volcanic earthquakes were plotted by the Philippine Seismic Network with magnitudes 1.5 to 2.2, with no felt event. However as recorded by the Taal Volcano Network, 92 earthquakes were detected in the past 24 hours. Four of them are low frequency events, which are "caused by cracks resonating as magma and gases move toward the surface".

== Impact ==
=== Casualties ===
A total of 39 people died as a result of this eruption of Taal, although only one reported case was directly caused by the eruption on January 12, 2020. According to the Manila Bulletin, people either perished because they refused to follow the evacuation order or decided to return to their homes, or died in the evacuation centers of heart attacks caused by anxiety. One person died in a collision along the South Luzon Expressway in Calamba, Laguna during "zero visibility" conditions caused by ashfall. On February 15, 2020, a body of a man was recovered under mud and ash at Taal Volcano Island.

=== Economic ===
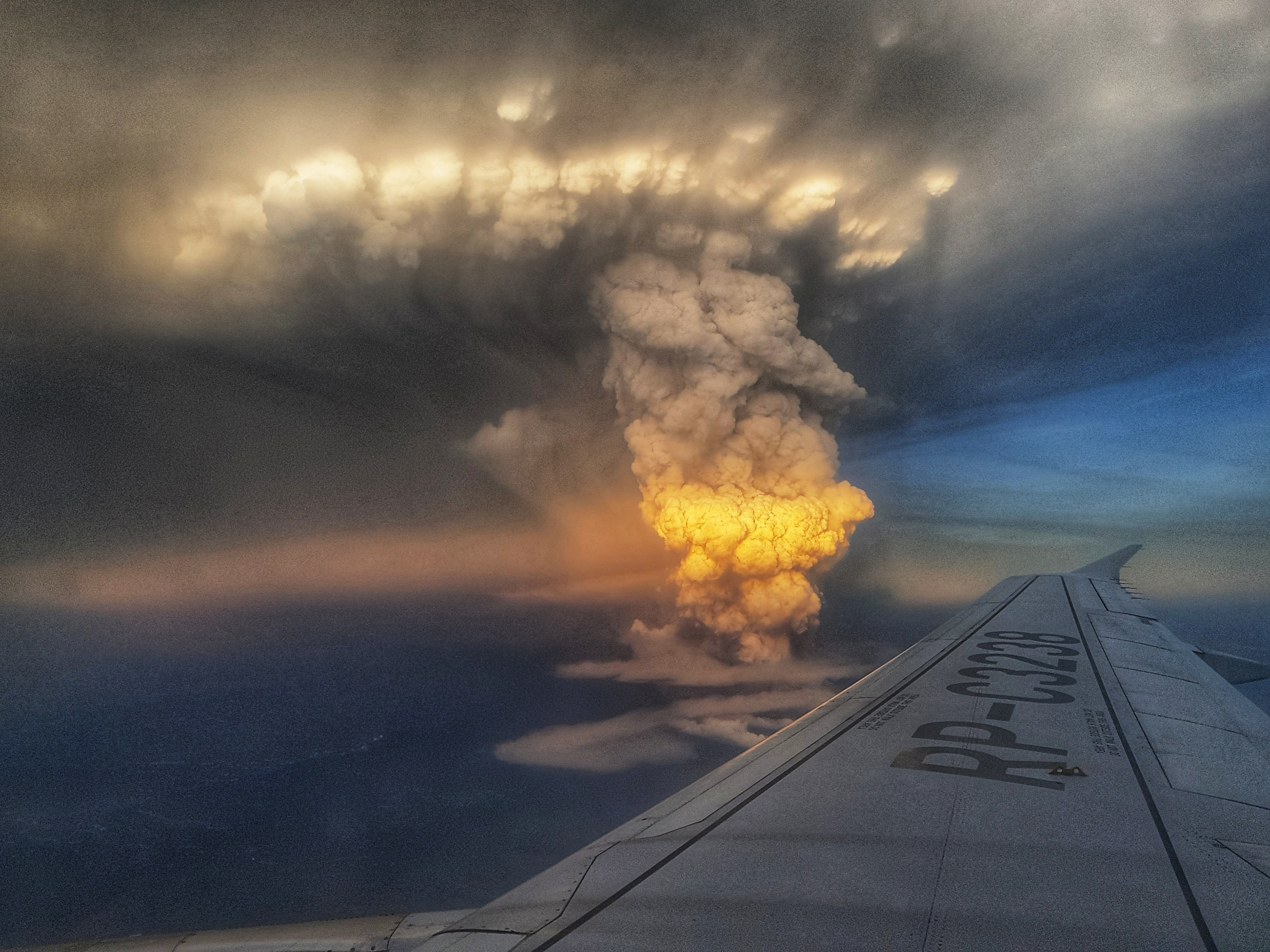
View of the eruption from an airplane

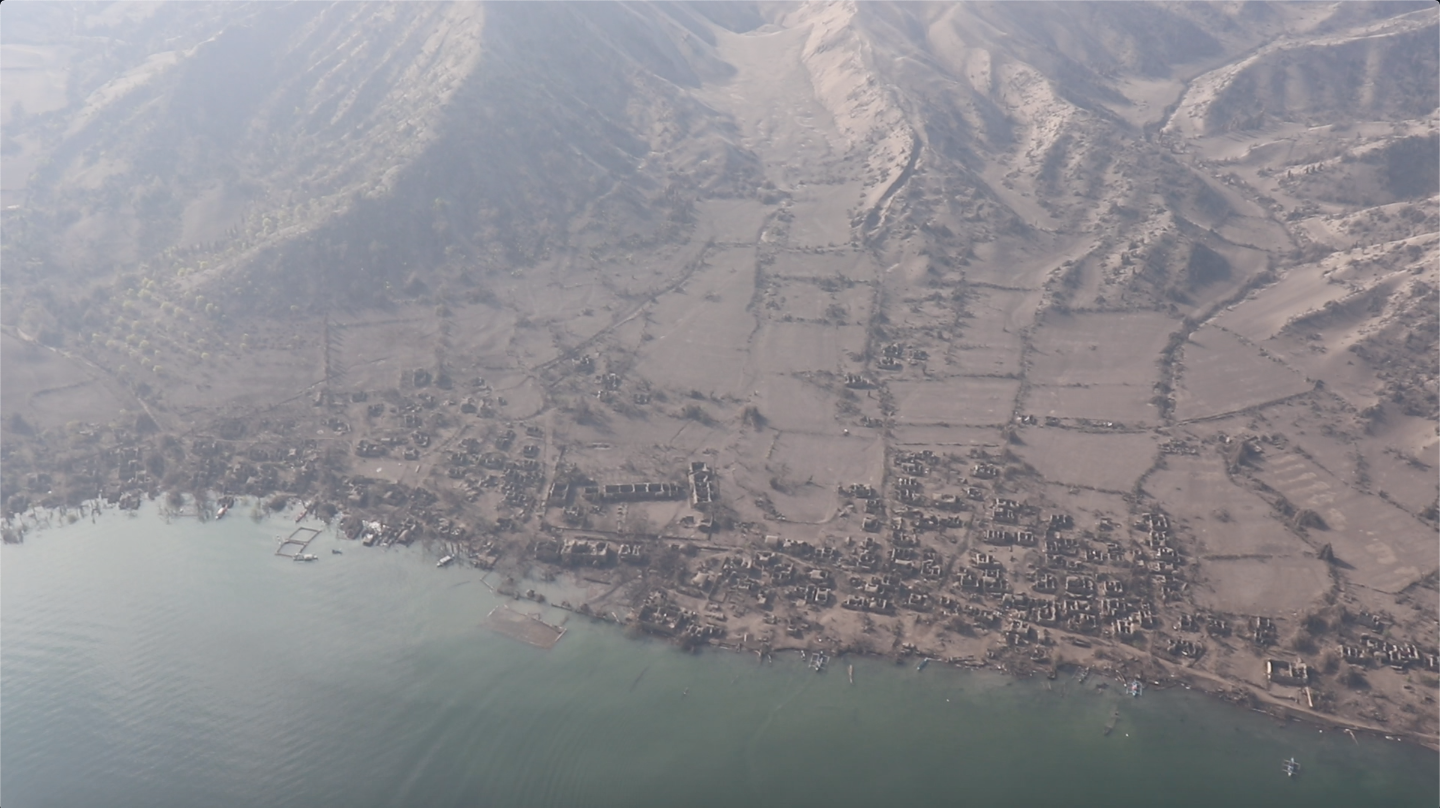
Houses at a portion of the Taal Volcano island destroyed by ashfall.

Demand for N95 masks increased rapidly during the eruption and later, the COVID-19 pandemic (after the Philippines' first case was reported on January 30), with some stores inflating its prices to ₱200 ($3.95) a piece from the standard ₱25–40 ($0.49–0.79). The Department of Trade and Industry (DTI) dispatched teams to monitor and observe the movement of retail prices in the market and warned businesses against raising prices for higher profit margins. After DTI inspection, Trade Undersecretary Ruth Castelo commented that some medical establishments were selling 'fake' N95 masks, some of which are not medical-grade, and could still let in large foreign air particulates. Due to the outcome of surprise inspections and consumer complaints, DTI has imposed notices of violation to 12 of the 17 stores that were inspected in Bambang, Manila, citing that these businesses will be charged with administrative and criminal cases for violating the Consumer Act. Manila Mayor Isko Moreno threatened to revoke the permits of medical supply chains in the city involved in the price hike of face masks. Mercury Drug, a major pharmaceutical chain, pledged to replenish supply for the masks where prices would remain steady and that it would not hoard the supply. The Department of Health imposed price controls on health-related goods, including face masks, to protect consumers from profiteering and hoarding. The DOH mandates that the prices of N95 masks, in particular, should range between ₱45–105 ($0.89–2.07).

The Philippine Stock Exchange suspended trading following the eruption on January 13.

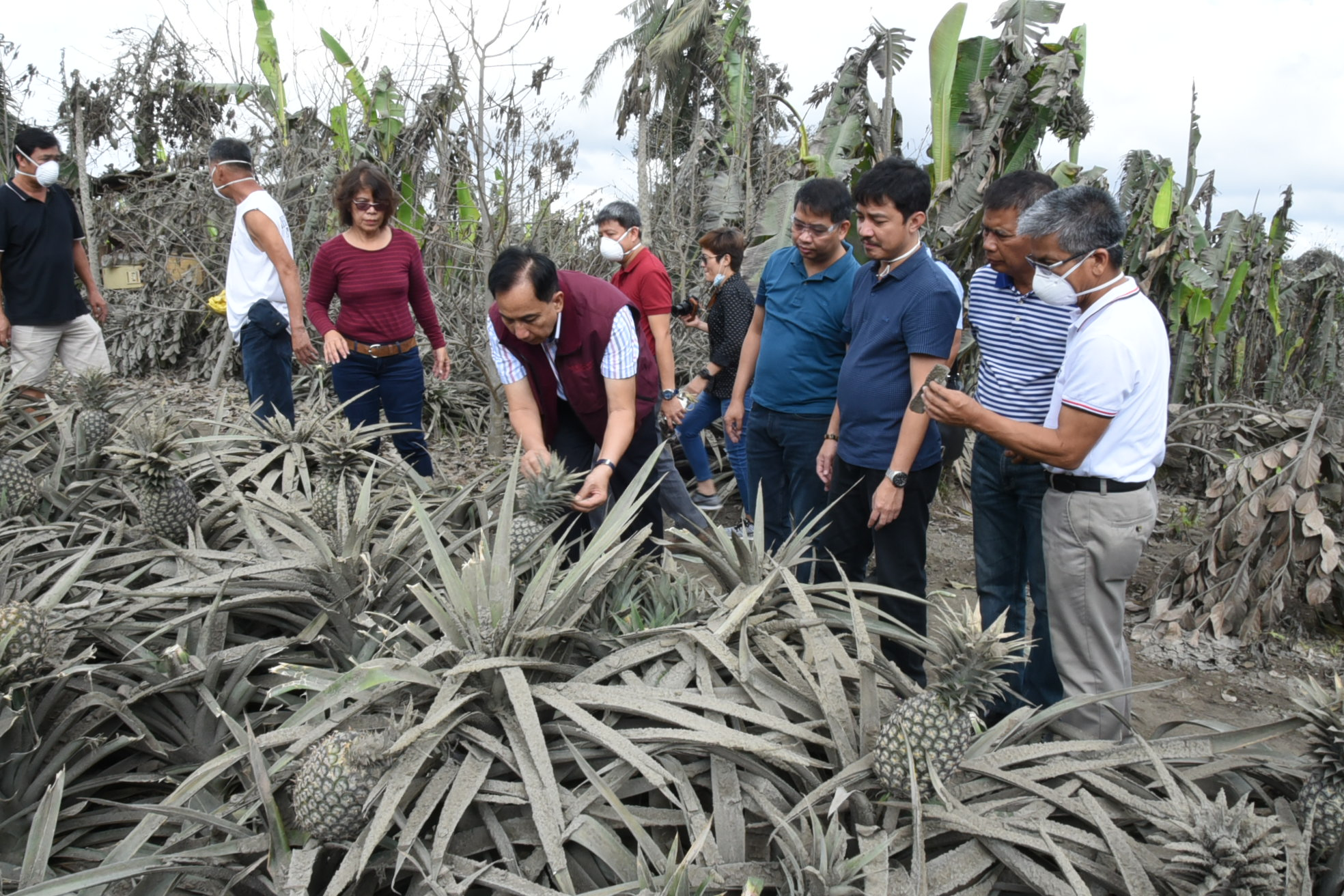
Agriculture Secretary William Dar inspecting ash-covered pineapple plants on January 18, 2020

The Department of Agriculture (DA) reported that the damage to crops caused by the eruption are estimated to be ₱3.06 billion ($60.1 million), covering 2,722 hectares (27.22 km^{2}) that includes 1,967 animals. Fisheries in the Taal Lake, consisting of about 6,000 fish cages to capture a total of 15,033 metric tons of fish, suffered losses of ₱1.6 billion ($31.4 million). Kapeng barako and Coffea liberica crops, major products of Batangas and Cavite, have damages worth at least ₱360.5 million ($7.08 million) for 8,240 metric tons and 748 hectares (1,850 acres) of land. Pineapple plantations in the Cavite towns of Amadeo, Silang and General Trias lost 21,079 metric tons of pineapple worth ₱527.25 million ($10.4 million). Rice crops in 308 hectares (760 acres) of fields across Calabarzon were lost, amounting to ₱5.6 million ($109,985), while 5,329 metric tons of corn placed losses at ₱88.9 million ($1.7 million). The Philippine Crop Insurance Corporation reassured around 1,200 farmers and fishermen in Batangas that they are insured of a three-year zero-interest survival and recovery loan worth ₱25,000 ($494.13) each, to be provided by the Mount Carmel Rural Bank. The DA plans to distribute materials and mechanisms for crop and livestock intervention worth ₱160 million ($3.1 million), which includes 5,000 coffea mother plants and 1,000 cocoa bean seedlings from the Bureau of Plant Industry, to 17 local government units in Batangas. The Philippine Carabao Center and National Dairy Authority delivered 1 tonne (15,000,000 gr) of corn silages and 1.5 tonnes (23,000,000 gr) of rice straws, a total of 2.5 tonnes (39,000,000 gr) of dietary fiber, to Batangas.

A brickworks in Biñan, Laguna used the ash spewed from Taal to manufacture hollow blocks and bricks. Through a combination of ash, sand, cement and discarded plastic waste, around 5,000 bricks were manufactured a day and used to rebuild houses and other buildings that were damaged by the eruption. Biñan Mayor Arman Dimaguila formally instructed residents in the city to help gather ashes and deliver it to the local brickworks.

PhilPost announced on January 16 that it would suspend delivery and acceptance of mail in Batangas towns near the Taal Volcano which falls within the "danger zone".

=== Health ===
The Department of Health advised the public to remain indoors and minimize outdoor activities. They also advised the public to refrain from purchasing and consuming freshwater fish from the Taal Lake, such as tilapia and Sardinella tawilis, as these may have been affected by the sulfur from the eruption.

Agriculture Secretary William Dar clarified that fruits and vegetables filled with ash, including the Coffea liberica fruits that are homegrown in Batangas and Cavite, are safely consumable upon cleansing.

=== Air traffic ===
NASA animation of the volcanic plume released by Taal from January 12–13, 2020, using data from JMA's Himawari 8 satellite. The eruption disrupted several flights to and from the Luzon island.

On January 12, 2020, the Manila International Airport Authority (MIAA) suspended all flights to and from all terminals of Ninoy Aquino International Airport (NAIA) in Manila following the eruption due to the various hazardous effects of volcanic ash on flight safety. The MIAA recorded that at least 516 flights from and to NAIA were suspended, with about 80,000 passengers affected. On January 13, operations at NAIA resumed partially from 10 am onwards, although many flights still remained canceled or delayed. A number of international flights bound for NAIA were diverted to either Clark International Airport in Angeles City, Mactan–Cebu International Airport, Haneda Airport in Tokyo, Hong Kong International Airport, or Antonio B. Won Pat International Airport in Guam. By January 14, 604 flights were canceled according to the NDRRMC. However, by January 15, 537 of those flights had resumed operations.

The Civil Aviation Authority of the Philippines advised the Luzon International Premiere Airport Development Corporation to suspend flights at Clark International Airport as reports indicate that ash could reach the area. On January 13, only ten flights were reported to have been canceled, while nine flights were delayed.

At Mactan–Cebu International Airport (MCIA), only 25 domestic flights (all bound for NAIA) and one international flight were canceled, all of which were on January 14. However, the MCIA had to accommodate five international flights bound for NAIA that were diverted. The GMR–Megawide Cebu Airport Corporation (GMCAC), the operator of the MCIA, requested that all diverted flights should be accommodated on a "first-come, first-serve basis" depending on the availability of aircraft parking bays. Aside from hotel bookings, passengers of the diverted flights were given small food packs. MCIA provided passengers with free bus services for inter-airport transfers and city hotel transfers. Retail stores and food concessionaires at the airport terminals immediately restocked their supply and offered discounts for passengers, available from January 12 to 14.

=== Sports ===
Collegiate leagues, the University Athletic Association of the Philippines (UAAP) and the National Collegiate Athletic Association (NCAA) postponed games to be held in Metro Manila on January 13, 2020, due to ash fall. The junior basketball and junior football ties were to be held by the UAAP and volleyball games for the NCAA. The AFC Champions League match between Ceres–Negros and Shan United scheduled for January 14, 2020, at the Rizal Memorial Stadium in Manila was threatened to be postponed due to ash fall the day before but match officials decided that game should push through.

== Response ==
=== Local response ===
==== 2020 ====
On January 13, 2020, the provincial board of Batangas declared the province under a state of calamity following the eruption, ordering the evacuation of residents within a radius of 14 kilometres (8.7 mi) from the volcano. The United Nations Office for the Coordination of Humanitarian Affairs issued a situation report stating that an estimated number of 459,300 people are within the 14-kilometer danger zone; charity organization Save the Children estimated that 21,000 of those are children. According to the NDRRMC situational report for January 18, 2020, a total of 16,174 families or 70,413 individuals are taking shelter in 300 evacuation centers. These evacuation centers consist of over 140 schools across Batangas, Cavite and Laguna, according to the Department of Education (DepEd). A total of 96,061 people were affected and electricity was cut in seven municipalities and cities across Batangas and Cavite. The Talisay–Tagaytay Road in Calabarzon was temporarily closed because of the evacuation of the residents. The Department of Social Welfare and Development (DSWD) also stated that there are 5,000 family food packs and sleeping kits on the way for distribution to the evacuation centers. The DSWD and the Department of Health (DOH) handed a combined total of ₱4.9 million (US$96,656) worth of assistance to the affected residents in Calabarzon. On January 15, 2020, Cavite Governor Jonvic Remulla declared the province under a state of calamity.

A state of calamity was declared in the whole Calabarzon region via Proclamation No. 906 which was signed by President Rodrigo Duterte on February 21. The declaration is set to last for one year unless lifted.

Interior Secretary Eduardo Año directed the governors, mayors and local chief executives of Central Luzon, the National Capital Region and Southern Tagalog to convene their disaster risk reduction and management councils and instantly activate their incident management teams, network operations centers and other disaster response teams. The Department of the Interior and Local Government tasked the Philippine National Police (PNP) to deploy their disaster incident management task forces, reactionary standby forces and search and rescue units to the affected areas, while the Bureau of Fire Protection were tasked to assist the PNP and local government units in the mandatory evacuation of affected residents. Año also urged the public to donate basic necessities to the victims through the local government units. The Metropolitan Manila Development Authority, Philippine Air Force and Philippine Navy personnel have been dispatched to help the victims of the Taal volcano eruption.

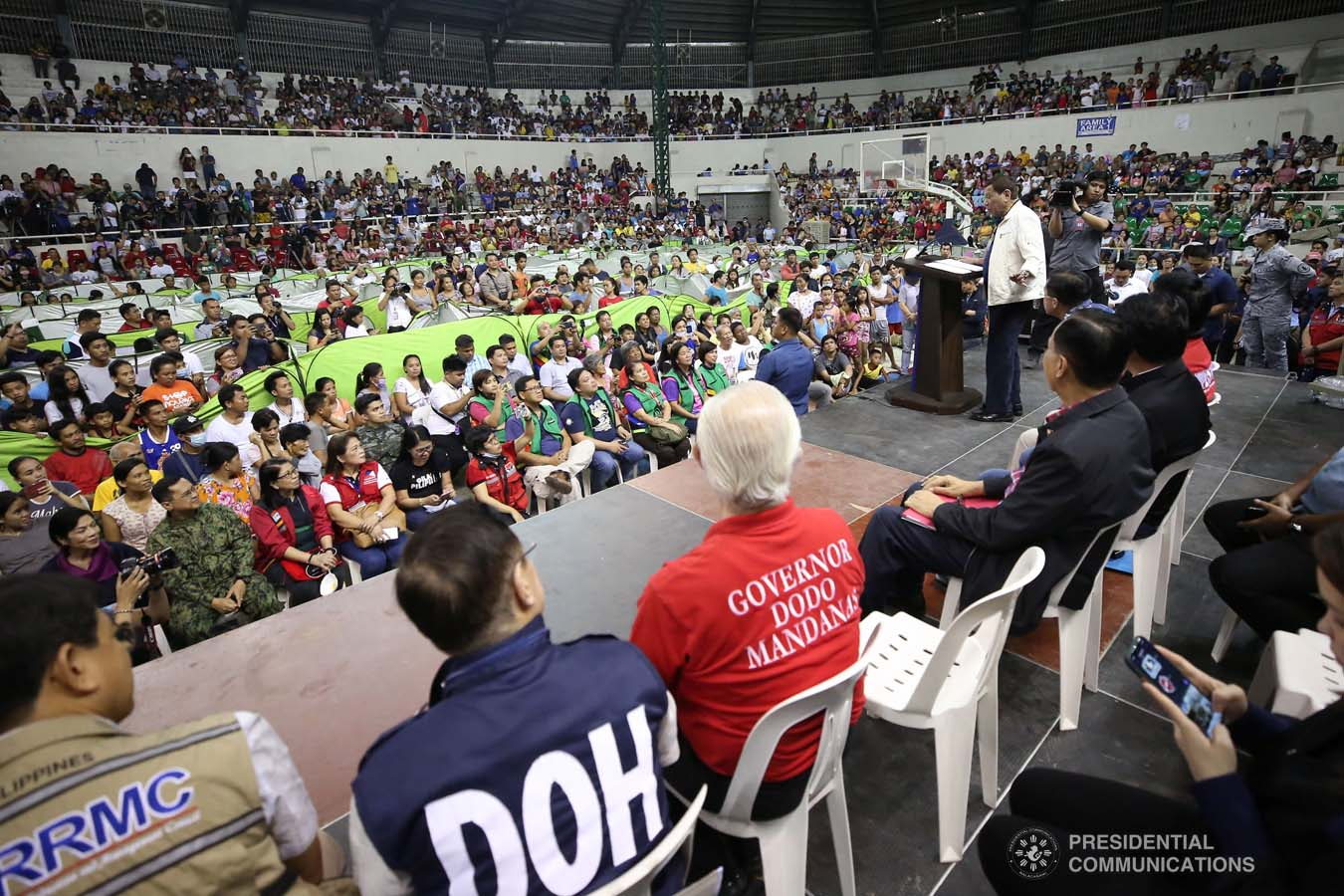
President Rodrigo Duterte addresses evacuees in Batangas City, January 14, 2020

President Rodrigo Duterte, who was in Davao City during the eruption, ordered Executive Secretary Salvador Medialdea to suspend classes and government work in Calabarzon, Central Luzon and Metro Manila. President Duterte flew to Manila on the morning of January 13 and continued with his scheduled activities there. Duterte visited evacuees in Batangas City on January 14, 2020, and pledged to provide financial assistance worth ₱130 million ($2.6 million) to the affected residents. He approved the recommendation of Defense Secretary Delfin Lorenzana to prohibit individuals from visiting or inhabiting the Taal island, declaring it a "no man's land". While addressing evacuees in Batangas City, President Duterte also pushed for the construction of additional evacuation centers to be built "simultaneously" in disaster-prone areas during his administration. Concurrently, Vice President Leni Robredo visited the municipalities of Santa Teresita and San Jose, and the city of Santo Tomas in Batangas, where she helped distribute food packs and face masks to the affected residents. Robredo stressed the lack of medicines, toilets, toiletries and sleeping mats being provided to them, other than food and water. She also requested local officials to prepare an inventory of the damage.

The Smart and Globe telephone companies offered free calls, internet services and charging stations for those affected. Water concessionaire Manila Water, in cooperation with Batangas Provincial Disaster Risk Reduction and Management Office, sent a convoy of 30 water tankers to various evacuation centers in Batangas. The company is also sending an initial 2,000 five-gallon units of bottled water. Meralco, the country's leading power distributor, assembled solar-powered mobile charging stations at various evacuation centers across Cavite.

Following the eruption, several members of the Philippine Senate called for more action from government institutions in assisting the victims. Joel Villanueva urged the Department of Labor and Employment to issue an advisory that would guide private firms in the affected areas on deciding whether their operations should continue, considering the health and safety of its employees. Villanueva called on employers and designated safety officers to assess the safety conditions of the workplaces. Imee Marcos urged the DOH and the Barangay Health Volunteers to prioritize providing clinical audits to all evacuees for them to easily access medical health care. Francis Pangilinan urged the Department of Agriculture to provide long-term funding assistance and initiate alternative livelihood programs for the affected farmers and farmworkers. Pangilinan also urged the establishment of refuge areas for the pets of evacuees, as well as rescued stray animals from the affected areas. Nancy Binay and Risa Hontiveros called on the DOH and DSWD to include N95 masks, the prescribed mask for cases of volcanic ash, and other protective equipment in the provision of relief goods. Hontiveros also urged the DOH to provide mental health services, such as access to therapists, to victims who may have been traumatized by the disaster. On January 16, Cavite-based Senator Bong Revilla participated in the distribution of relief goods in several towns of his home province, which had been placed under a state of calamity. Some senators also proposed for additional measures to be implemented in the wake of the eruption. Senate President Tito Sotto proposed cloud seeding as a method to clear the fallen ash and debris. Officials from PHIVOLCS and PAGASA, however, rejected the proposal fearing that cloud seeding may result in acid rain or lahars. Sherwin Gatchalian urged the Philippine Congress to pass an additional budget of ₱10 billion ($196.4 million) to the nation's existing calamity budget, as at least ₱35 billion ($687.9 million) is at stake from the damages caused by the eruption.

In the Philippine House of Representatives, House Speaker Alan Peter Cayetano (Pateros–Taguig) directed Leyte 4th district representative Lucy Torres-Gomez, chairperson of the House Committee on Disaster Management, to collaborate with other relevant committees, government agencies and urban planning experts in composing a short-term and long-term comprehensive rehabilitation plan for the affected areas. Cavite 4th district representative Elpidio Barzaga Jr. filed House Resolution 643, ordering the House to conduct an investigation on the lack of warning from PHIVOLCS regarding the imminent eruption. Barzaga stated that PHIVOLCS had issued an Alert Level 1 on Taal Volcano (indicating a "slight increase in volcanic activity") since March 2019, but he claimed that it failed to properly disseminate information to the public. The resolution also probes the presence of permanent settlements in the Taal island, despite the PHIVOLCS having already declared the island a "permanent danger zone". House Majority Leader Martin Romualdez (Leyte 1st district), however, defended PHIVOLCS by implying the difficulty in predicting the occurrence of volcanic eruptions. Romualdez added that the House allotted to PHIVOLCS an additional ₱221.4 million ($4.3 million) in order to reform "the country's monitoring and warning program for volcanic eruption."

Senator Grace Poe and Albay 2nd district representative Joey Salceda pushed Congress to immediately pass the Department of Disaster Resilience (DDR) Bill to create the said department, an executive department responsible for disaster response and emergency management. Poe illustrated that the DDR would place the existing NDRRMC under its organizational structure and create three new bureaus (disaster resiliency, disaster preparation and response, and knowledge management and dissemination). Salceda criticized the government's current system of disaster response mobilization that requires a "time consuming and confusing" inter-agency coordination, adding that the creation of the DDR would resolve these issues by "unifying the different functions" to ensure the efficiency of disaster relief goods and personnel.

Several provinces have contributed humanitarian aid to the affected residents. The provincial government of Pampanga has sent aid, totaling in 8,500 food packs, plus teams of medical personnel, social workers, and search and rescue personnel for deployment. In addition, city governments across Metro Manila have also contributed aid, ranging from in-kind donations, toiletries, food packs, N95 masks and others. Other local governments soon pitched help, including the provincial governments of Quirino and Bulacan, which donated food packs and medical supplies. Meanwhile, farmers and traders in the provinces of Benguet and Nueva Vizcaya donated vegetables to the Taal victims. The autonomous regional government of Bangsamoro also sent ₱2 million-worth of food and non-food items as aid.

The fanbase of pop singer Sarah Geronimo organized a charity public event at Luneta Park in Manila on January 18 where attendees participated in a flash mob of the viral "Tala" dance challenge. The proceeds for participating in the event would be forwarded to the Philippine Red Cross for donations to the eruption victims.

The University of the Philippines will open its own map data of the volcano from 2014 to 2017 through its UP Training Center for Applied Geodesy and Photogrammetry to the public to speed up the rehabilitation of the affected areas.

In October 2020, the National Housing Authority (Philippines) (NHA) revealed that the Department of Budget and Management has not yet allotted a budget to the agency for the relocation of displaced residents, though to compensate the NHA has opened its inventory of 10,000 available housing units in Batangas, Cavite and Laguna to the evacuees.

==== 2021 ====
As the result of 2021 eruption, over 4,000 residents from three barangays near the volcano in the province's municipality of Laurel voluntarily left their homes that night and were subsequently sheltered, 16 kilometers away from the area.

Some evacuees were brought to Nasugbu while the others in Alfonso, Cavite, where the latter will conduct a COVID-19 antigen test for the individuals in their area. Meanwhile, the NDRRMC reported that 1,282 individuals from nearby municipalities of the province flee from their towns and are in evacuation shelters on July 2, 2021. The Department of Social Welfare and Development (DSWD) have prepared over ₱1.4 million (US$28,419) worth of food packs and ₱11 million (US$223,297) in non-food items for the evacuees. The Southern Luzon Command of the AFP were also dispatched in Batangas to aid the Calabarzon Regional Disaster Risk Reduction and Management Council (RDRRMC) and local government units (LGUs) in the area, while the Calabarzon police forces were on alert since July 2 due to the volcano's activity.

==== 2022 ====
The PHIVOLCS advised the evacuation of high risk areas, such as the Volcano Island, which have been considered as a permanent danger zone, the barangays of Bilibinwang and Banyaga in the town of Agoncillo, and the barangays of Boso-boso, Gulod and eastern Bugaan East in the town of Laurel. The NDRRMC reported that at least 9,000 individuals from municipalities of the province of Batangas are evacuated.

=== International response ===
The Philippine government, while it said that it would accept any international aid, has stated that it will not actively seek for foreign aid believing that it still has the capability to deal with the Taal Volcano eruption.

The China Coast Guard donated 600 pieces of N95 masks, food packs, and other relief goods to evacuees in Batangas through the Philippine Coast Guard.

The United States Agency for International Development and its Volcano Disaster Assistance Program, through the U.S. Embassy in the Philippines, is providing thermographic cameras and remote technical support to assist the Philippine government in monitoring Taal's volcanic activity. South Korea has also pledged US$200,000 in humanitarian aid through the Philippine Red Cross. The Singapore Red Cross on their part relayed about S$67,000-worth of humanitarian aid to support the operations of their Philippine counterpart. The Emirates Red Crescent also sent a delegation to the Philippines to assist on the relief operations.

American comedian Dave Chappelle, who visited Manila during the eruption, donated ₱1 million ($19,671) to the relief efforts for the eruption victims through the Rayomar Outreach Foundation.

The European Union, through its Acute Large Emergency Response Tool (ALERT), has donated ₱42 million (€750 thousand) in humanitarian aid which includes emergency shelter, psychosocial support services including child protection services and essential household items.

== See also ==
- List of large volcanic eruptions in the 21st century
