= Hydrothermal circulation =

Circulation of water driven by heat exchange

Hydrothermal circulation in its most general sense is the circulation of hot water (Ancient Greek ὕδωρ, water, and θέρμη, heat). Hydrothermal circulation occurs most often in the vicinity of sources of heat within the Earth's crust. In general, this occurs near volcanic activity, but can occur in the shallow to mid crust along deeply penetrating fault irregularities or in the deep crust related to the intrusion of granite, or as the result of orogeny or metamorphism. Hydrothermal circulation often results in hydrothermal mineral deposits.

== Seafloor hydrothermal circulation ==
Hydrothermal circulation in the oceans is the passage of the water through mid-oceanic ridge systems.

The term includes both the circulation of the well-known, high-temperature vent waters near the ridge crests, and the much-lower-temperature, diffuse flow of water through sediments and buried basalts further from the ridge crests. The former circulation type is sometimes termed "active", and the latter "passive". In both cases, the principle is the same: Cold, dense seawater sinks into the basalt of the seafloor and is heated at depth whereupon it rises back to the rock-ocean water interface due to its lesser density. The heat source for the active vents is the newly formed basalt, and, for the highest temperature vents, the underlying magma chamber. The heat source for the passive vents is the still-cooling older basalts. Heat flow studies of the seafloor suggest that basalts within the oceanic crust take millions of years to completely cool as they continue to support passive hydrothermal circulation systems.

Hydrothermal vents are locations on the seafloor where hydrothermal fluids mix into the overlying ocean. Perhaps the best-known vent forms are the naturally occurring chimneys referred to as black smokers.

== Volcanic and magma related hydrothermal circulation ==
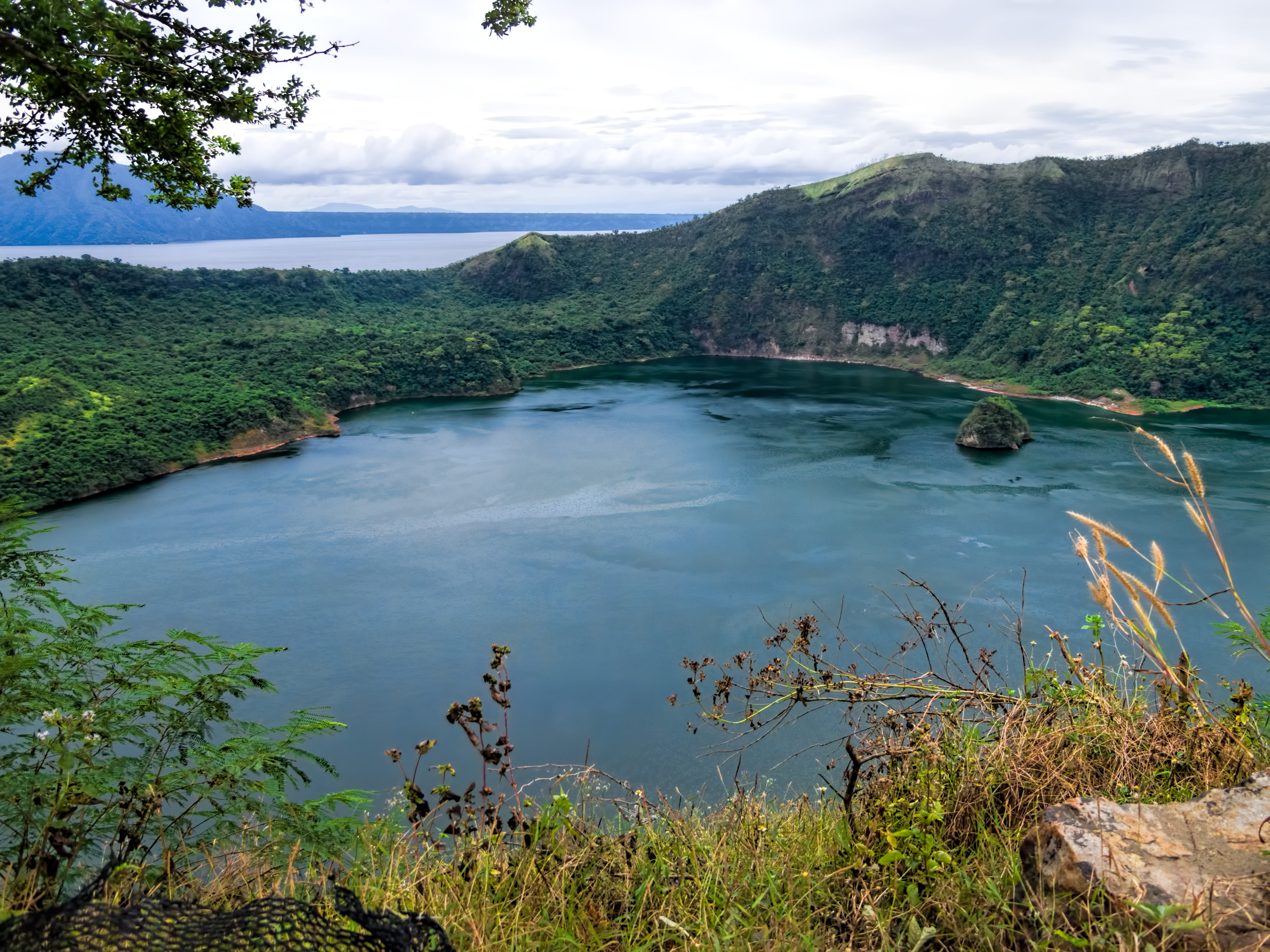
Taal Volcano Main Crater Lake, where hydrothermal circulating convection cells exist

Hydrothermal circulation is not limited to ocean ridge environments. Hydrothermal circulating convection cells can exist in any place an anomalous source of heat, such as an intruding magma or volcanic vent, comes into contact with the groundwater system where permeability allows flow. This convection can manifest as hydrothermal explosions, geysers, and hot springs, although this is not always the case.

Hydrothermal circulation above magma bodies has been intensively studied in the context of geothermal projects where many deep wells are drilled into the system to produce and subsequently re-inject the hydrothermal fluids. The detailed data sets available from this work show the long term persistence of these systems, the development of fluid circulation patterns, histories that can be influenced by renewed magmatism, fault movement, or changes associated with hydrothermal brecciation and eruption sometimes followed by massive cold water invasion. Less direct but as intensive study has focused on the minerals deposited especially in the upper parts of hydrothermal circulation systems.

Understanding volcanic and magma-related hydrothermal circulation means studying hydrothermal explosions, geysers, hot springs, and other related systems and their interactions with associated surface water and groundwater bodies. A good environment to observe this phenomenon is in volcanogenic lakes where hot springs and geysers are commonly present. The convection systems in these lakes work through cold lake water percolating downward through the permeable lake bed, mixing with groundwater heated by magma or residual heat, and rising to form thermal springs at discharge points.

The existence of hydrothermal convection cells and hot springs or geysers in these environments depends not only on the presence of a colder water body and geothermal heat but also strongly depends on a no-flow boundary at the water table. These systems can develop their own boundaries. For example the water level represents a fluid pressure condition that leads to gas exsolution or boiling that in turn causes intense mineralization that can seal cracks.

== Deep crust ==
Hydrothermal also refers to the transport and circulation of water within the deep crust, in general from areas of hot rocks to areas of cooler rocks. The causes for this convection can be:

- Intrusion of magma into the crust
- Radioactive heat generated by cooled masses of granite
- Heat from the mantle
- Hydraulic head from mountain ranges, for example, the Great Artesian Basin
- Dewatering of metamorphic rocks, which liberates water
- Dewatering of deeply buried sediments

Hydrothermal circulation, in particular in the deep crust, is a primary cause of mineral deposit formation and a cornerstone of most theories on ore genesis.

=== Hydrothermal ore deposits ===
During the early 1900s, various geologists worked to classify hydrothermal ore deposits that they assumed formed from upward-flowing aqueous solutions. Waldemar Lindgren (1860–1939) developed a classification based on interpreted decreasing temperature and pressure conditions of the depositing fluid. His terms: "hypothermal", "mesothermal", "epithermal" and "teleothermal", expressed decreasing temperature and increasing distance from a deep source. Recent studies retain only the epithermal label. John Guilbert's 1985 revision of Lindgren's system for hydrothermal deposits includes the following:

- Ascending hydrothermal fluids, magmatic or meteoric water
  - Porphyry copper and other deposits, 200–800 °C, moderate pressure
  - Igneous metamorphic, 300–800 °C, low to moderate pressure
  - Cordilleran veins, intermediate to shallow depths
  - Epithermal, shallow to intermediate, 50–300 °C, low pressure
- Circulating heated meteoric solutions
  - Mississippi Valley-type deposits, 25–200 °C, low pressure
  - Western US uranium, 25–75 °C, low pressure
- Circulating heated seawater
  - Oceanic ridge deposits, 25–300 °C, low pressure

== See also ==
- Volcanogenic massive sulfide ore deposit
- Geothermal gradient
- Hydrothermal synthesis
