= Evans Creek Preserve =

Nature park in Sammamish, Washington, United States

Coordinates: 47.642°N 122.046°W

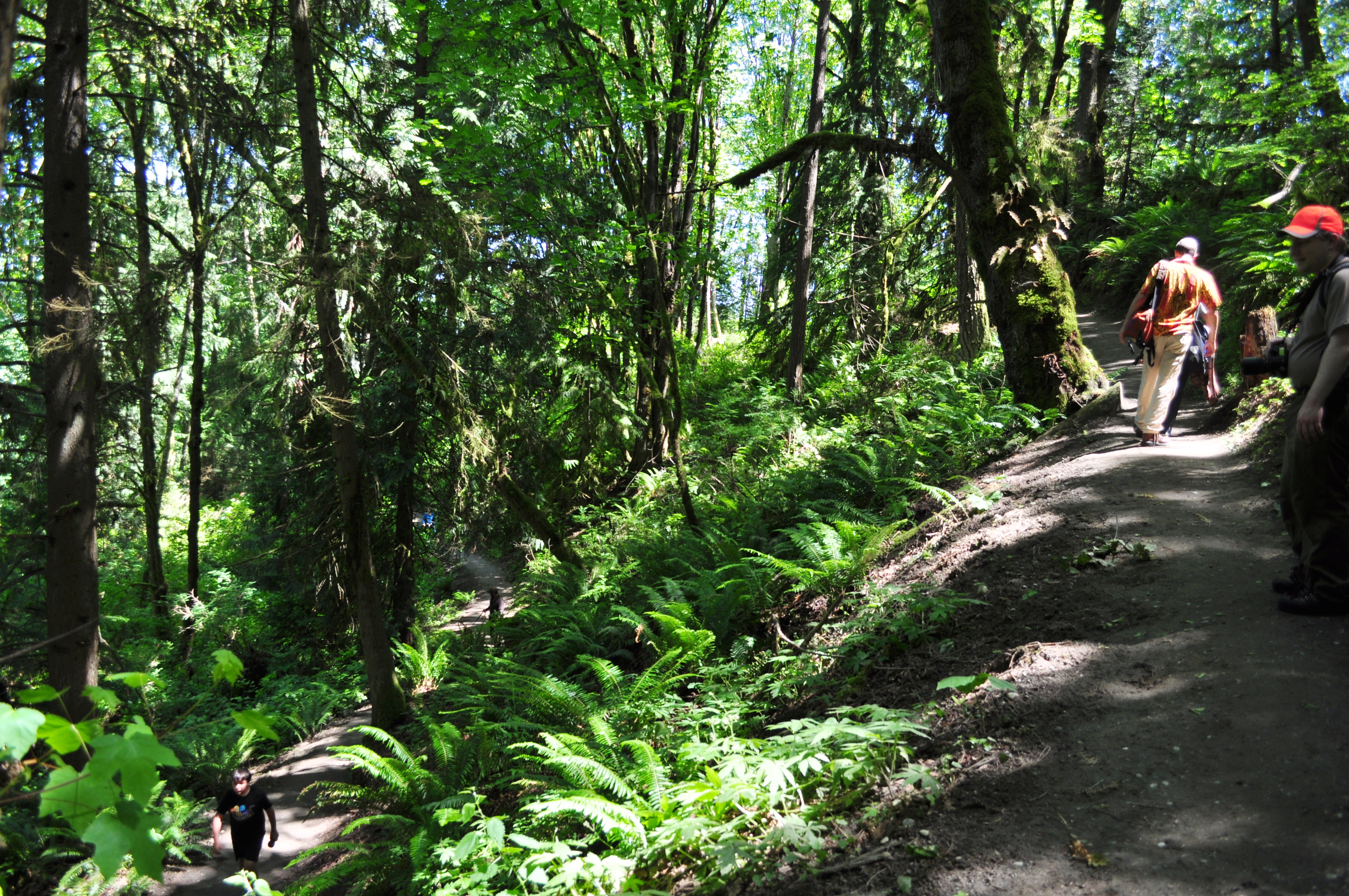
- Interactive map of Evans Creek Preserve
- Location: 4001 224th Ave NE, Redmond, Washington 98053, United States of America
- Area: 179 acres
- Created: 2000
- Website: www.sammamish.us/departments/parksandrec/projects/EvansCreekPreserve.aspx

Evans Creek Preserve is a 179-acre (72 ha) natural area that was donated to the City of Sammamish, Washington, in 2000. The site includes portions of Evans Creek and other water features, wetlands, and meadows, as well as steep terrain. The site provides habitat for black bears, beavers, hawks, deer, and songbirds. There are nurse trees on the site, which are tree stumps that provide nutrients for new trees.

Construction of a 10-stall parking lot, restrooms, trails, benches, and other amenities were completed in 2011 with a partnership between the City of Sammamish, the Washington Trails Association, businesses, and community organizations. Construction of additional trails occurred from 2013 through 2016.

The park has two trailheads. The older trailhead is on 224th Ave NE. The newer trailhead is located at 3650 Sahalee Way NE.
