= Renaissance School of Art and Reasoning =

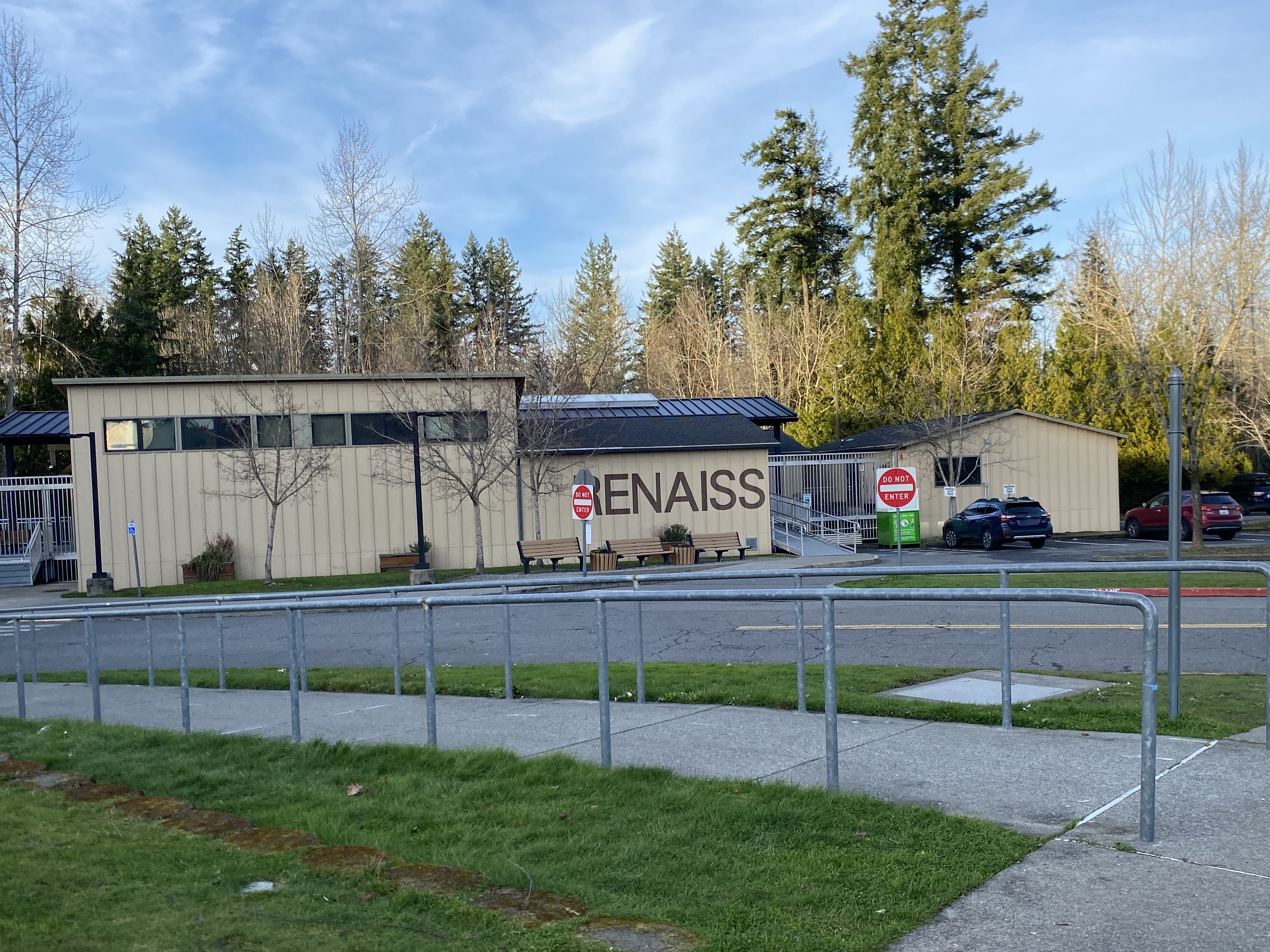
- Renaissance School of Art and Reasoning in 2026.

Location
- 400 228th Ave. N.E. Sammamish, Washington 98074; United States; 47.613354°N 122.031487°W

Information
- School type: Choice school
- Founded: 2006
- Status: open
- School district: Lake Washington School District
- Principal: Todd Apple
- Head teacher: Elizabeth Rothwell
- Grades: 6-8
- Age range: 11-15
- Enrollment: 79 (2025-2026)
- Average class size: 30
- Student to teacher ratio: 13:1
- Language: English
- Hours in school day: 6 (4 on Wednesdays)
- Classrooms: 5
- Campus: Eastlake High School
- Colors: purple, black, silver
- Budget: $30,194 (2024-2025)
- Feeder schools: all elementary schools in LWSD
- Website: rsar.lwsd.org

Renaissance School of Art and Reasoning is a public middle school located in Sammamish, King County, Washington, USA. It uses a lottery based system to accept and reject students from the Lake Washington School District. Renaissance, located on the campus of Eastlake High School, has an arts-based curriculum and a maximum enrollment of 96 students, 32 in each grade. Renaissance accepts student applications from all elementary and middle schools in Lake Washington School District.

== History ==
Renaissance was founded in 2006 by Martha Daman. The school held its first commencement for graduating ninth grade students in June 2009. However, in 2011, all schools in the Lake Washington School District decided that children would begin middle school/junior high in sixth grade, and graduate middle school/junior high in eighth grade.

== Curriculum ==
The Renaissance curriculum is based in the visual and performing arts. The school's total enrollment is deliberately kept small.

== See also ==
- Charter school
