= Sammamish, Washington =

- City
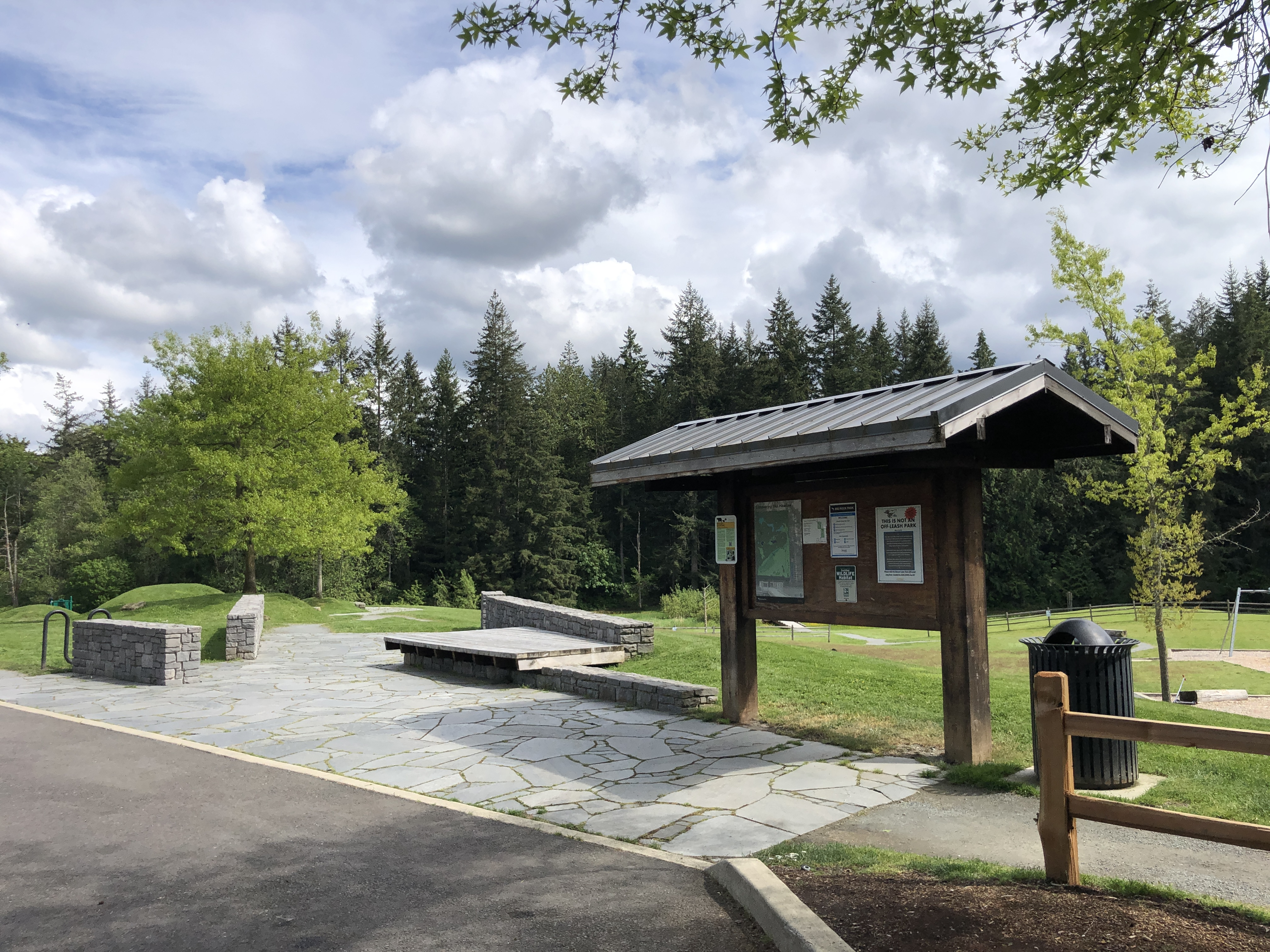
- Big Rock Park North in Sammamish

- Seal

- Location of Sammamish in Washington
- Coordinates: 47°36′30″N 122°02′12″W
- Country: United States
- State: Washington
- County: King
- Incorporated: August 31, 1999

Government
  - Type: Council–manager
  - Mayor: Karen Howe
  - City manager: Scott MacColl

Area
  - Total: 24.04 sq mi (62.26 km^{2})
  - Land: 20.43 sq mi (52.91 km^{2})
  - Water: 3.61 sq mi (9.34 km^{2})
- Elevation: 397 ft (121 m)

Population (2020)
  - Total: 67,455
  - Estimate (2024): 66,474
  - Rank: US: 591st WA: 19th
  - Density: 3,303/sq mi (1,275.3/km^{2})
- Time zone: UTC–8 (Pacific (PST))
  - Summer (DST): UTC–7 (PDT)
- ZIP Codes: 98029, 98074, 98075
- Area code: 425
- FIPS code: 53-61115
- GNIS feature ID: 2411772
- Website: sammamish.us

Sammamish (/səˈmæmɪʃ/ sə-MAM-ish) is a city in King County, Washington, United States. The population was 67,455 at the 2020 census. Located on a plateau, the city is bordered by Lake Sammamish to the west and the Snoqualmie Valley to the east. Sammamish is situated 20 miles east of Seattle, is a member of the Eastside, and is a part of the Seattle metropolitan area.

== Etymology ==
The name "Sammamish" is an anglicization of the Lushootseed name of the Sammamish people, sc̓ababš. According to historian and writer David Buerge, the name derives from the word sc̓ap, meaning "willow," and the suffix -abš, meaning "people," meaning their name translates to "willow people." Alternatively, according to linguist and anthropologist T.T. Waterman, the name means "meander dwellers."

== History ==
Lake Sammamish and the adjacent plateau has been Duwamish, Suquamish, Snoqualmie, Sammamish, and Snohomish territory since the last Pleistocene glaciation, before contact with European people. They lived in longhouse villages in seven places on and near the coast of Sammamish Lake. Two of them were in present-day Sammamish.

The Sammamish Plateau was part of unincorporated King County for most of its recorded history. The first settlers arrived in the 1870s and established a trio of resorts by the 1930s. The community of Inglewood was established in 1889 with a plat filed with the county government. While the plateau remained predominantly rural, several other residential areas were established during the early 20th century. The Sunny Hills neighborhood was built in the 1960s and was followed by an elementary school.

Suburban homes, shopping centers, and schools were built on the plateau in the 1970s and 1980s. A vote in 1991 to join neighboring Issaquah failed, as did a vote on incorporation the following year. A renewed movement to become a city, born of frustration with development policies set by the county government, met with voter approval in 1998. Sammamish was officially incorporated on August 31, 1999. The city annexed Klahanie on January 1, 2016.

The city government approved plans in 2008 to develop a denser town center with mixed use zoning and taller buildings. The first two residential buildings and several commercial developments were completed over the following decade, but plans for the largest phase stalled into the 2020s. Construction began in 2024 on 38 townhomes in the phase, which is planned to be followed by more townhomes, 600 market rate apartments, and commercial space.

== Geography ==
According to the United States Census Bureau, the city has a total area of 24.04 square miles (62.26 km^{2}), of which 20.43 square miles (52.91 km^{2}) are land and 3.61 square miles (9.35 km^{2}) are water.

The city is situated on the shores and hilly terrain east of Lake Sammamish. It is bordered to the south by Issaquah, to the northwest by Redmond, and to the west across Lake Sammamish by Bellevue. Beaver Lake and Pine Lake are the two biggest lakes in Sammamish. Yellow Lake is a major lake in Klahanie.

Sammamish is in and near the Issaquah Alps, a westward extension of the Cascade foothills.

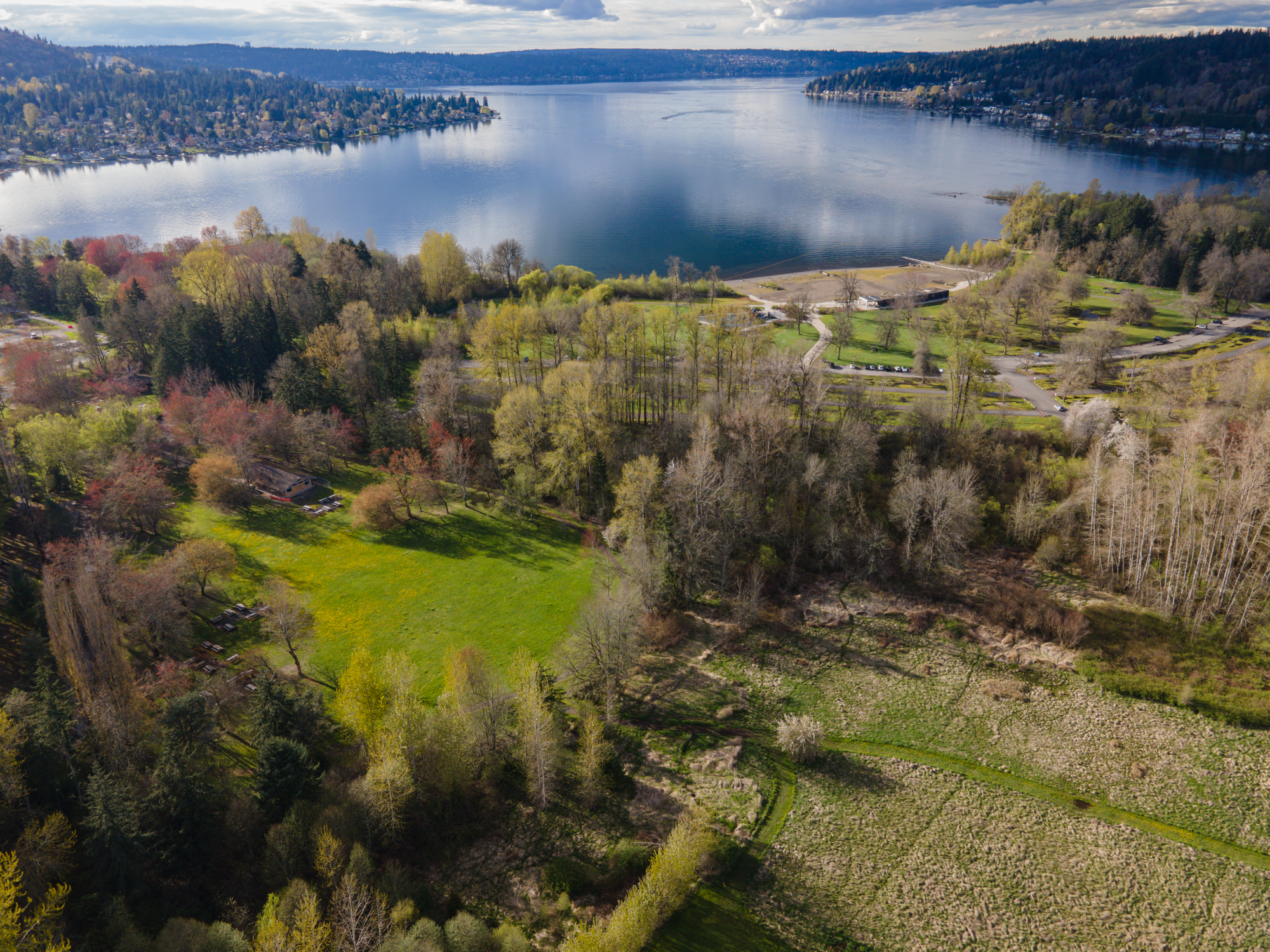
Sammamish in late April, from Lake Sammamish State Park.

=== Climate ===
The city has a warm-summer Mediterranean climate (Köppen: Csb), or oceanic (Köppen: Cfb) if the 30 millimetres (1.2 in) isohyet is used. Due to the rain shadow effect of the Olympic Mountains to the west, summers are much drier here than on the immediate west coast of Washington.

Winters are cool and wet; the wettest months are November, December, and January, when the area is directly affected by the Aleutian Low, and summers are warm and dry; the driest months are July and August. Snowfall is rare; subfreezing temperatures usually occur with a high-pressure system, which brings clear skies. Extremes range from −8 °F (−22 °C) in February 1950, to 113 °F (45 °C) in June 2021.

Sammamish is in hardiness zone 8b, with small southwestern pockets as well as the immediate Lake Sammamish coast falling into type 9a.

Climate data for Sammamish, Washington (1993–2023)
Month	Jan	Feb	Mar	Apr	May	Jun	Jul	Aug	Sep	Oct	Nov	Dec	Year
Record high °F (°C)	67 (19)	75 (24)	79 (26)	90 (32)	97 (36)	113 (45)	104 (40)	102 (39)	98 (37)	95 (35)	75 (24)	67 (19)	113 (45)
Mean maximum °F (°C)	56 (13)	60 (16)	68 (20)	78 (26)	85 (29)	88 (31)	91 (33)	90 (32)	88 (31)	79 (26)	65 (18)	54 (12)	91 (33)
Mean daily maximum °F (°C)	42 (6)	45 (7)	54 (12)	58 (14)	65 (18)	70 (21)	77 (25)	78 (26)	71 (22)	60 (16)	51 (11)	42 (6)	59 (15)
Daily mean °F (°C)	35 (2)	38 (3)	45 (7)	49 (9)	56 (13)	61 (16)	66 (19)	66 (19)	60 (16)	51 (11)	44 (7)	36 (2)	51 (10)
Mean daily minimum °F (°C)	29 (−2)	32 (0)	37 (3)	40 (4)	46 (8)	51 (11)	54 (12)	53 (12)	48 (9)	43 (6)	38 (3)	30 (−1)	42 (5)
Mean minimum °F (°C)	20 (−7)	23 (−5)	30 (−1)	35 (2)	40 (4)	45 (7)	50 (10)	50 (10)	42 (6)	36 (2)	29 (−2)	20 (−7)	20 (−7)
Record low °F (°C)	−6 (−21)	−8 (−22)	8 (−13)	24 (−4)	26 (−3)	31 (−1)	36 (2)	35 (2)	30 (−1)	23 (−5)	2 (−17)	−4 (−20)	−8 (−22)
Average precipitation inches (mm)	8.85 (225)	5.61 (142)	6.26 (159)	4.81 (122)	4.01 (102)	2.94 (75)	1.37 (35)	1.29 (33)	2.85 (72)	5.69 (145)	10.12 (257)	8.45 (215)	62.25 (1,582)
Average snowfall inches (cm)	3.3 (8.4)	3.7 (9.4)	1.2 (3.0)	0 (0)	0 (0)	0 (0)	0 (0)	0 (0)	0 (0)	0 (0)	1.6 (4.1)	3.3 (8.4)	13.1 (33)
Average rainy days	19.7	15.7	19.1	16.8	14.6	11.4	6.7	5.7	9.3	15.1	20.4	19.1	173.6
Average snowy days	6	4	2	1	0	0	0	0	0	0	2	6	21
Average relative humidity (%)	85	85	83	80	75	74	70	71	75	79	84	85	79
Average dew point °F (°C)	35.3 (1.8)	31.7 (−0.2)	32.8 (0.4)	38.7 (3.7)	46.5 (8.1)	47.7 (8.7)	50.6 (10.3)	53.5 (11.9)	49.8 (9.9)	46.1 (7.8)	45.9 (7.7)	33.8 (1.0)	42.7 (5.9)
Mean monthly sunshine hours	79	111	192	230	296	303	357	329	251	182	110	88	2,528
Mean daily sunshine hours	4.2	4.4	6.1	7.9	9	9.3	10.5	10.7	9.2	5.5	4.5	4.2	7.1
Mean daily daylight hours	8.9	10.3	11.9	13.6	15.1	16.0	15.6	14.3	12.6	10.9	9.3	8.5	12.3
Percentage possible sunshine	28.7	38.5	52.0	56.4	63.2	63.1	73.8	74.2	66.4	53.9	39.4	33.4	53.6
Average ultraviolet index	0	1	2	4	5	6	7	6	5	2	0	0	3

=== Climate change ===
Sammamish is predicted to warm by 3-12 F (2-7 C) before 2100 regardless of future emissions, and around 2.5 F during the next few decades due to climate change. Warming by any significant amount will cause Sammamish to have reduced snowfall, hotter and drier summers, and more warm-season extreme weather events.

Sammamish's climate change action plan includes, but is not limited to, tree replacement, voluntary planting, protecting threatened species, protecting native fish such as Chinook salmon and the streams, lakes and ponds they live in, floodplain management, wetland protection, emission reduction, light/noise pollution reduction, toxin (pesticide) control, and many other measures.

== Demographics ==
Historical population
Census	Pop.	Note	%±
2000	34,104		—
2010	45,780		34.2%
2020	67,455		47.3%
2024 (est.)	66,474		−1.5%
U.S. Decennial Census; 2020 Census

As of the 2023 American Community Survey, there are 21,792 estimated households in Sammamish with an average of 2.98 persons per household. The city has a median household income of $238,750 and the per capita income was $103,748. Approximately 2.9% of the city's population lives at or below the poverty line. Sammamish has an estimated 66.7% employment rate, with 83.4% of the population holding a bachelor's degree or higher and 97.8% holding a high school diploma.

The U.S. Census Bureau estimated that the median household income in Sammamish was $239,000 in 2022, placing it first among U.S. cities with a population greater than 65,000.

The top five reported languages spoken at home were English (56.3%), Spanish (3.4%), other Indo-European languages (14.6%), Asian and Pacific Islander (24.4%), and Other (1.2%).

The median age in the city was 41.3 years.

In 2007, CNN Money ranked Sammamish as the 11th Best Place to Live in the United States, and subsequently ranked it as #12 in 2009 and #15 in 2011. Sammamish was also ranked the 9th Best Place to Live by Money.com in 2018.

=== Racial and ethnic composition ===
Sammamish, Washington – racial and ethnic composition Note: the US Census treats Hispanic/Latino as an ethnic category. This table excludes Latinos from the racial categories and assigns them to a separate category. Hispanics/Latinos may be of any race.
Race / ethnicity (NH = non-Hispanic)	Pop. 2000	Pop. 2010	Pop. 2020	% 2000	% 2010	% 2020
White alone (NH)	29,361	32,909	34,652	86.09%	71.89%	51.37%
Black or African American alone (NH)	273	427	827	0.80%	0.93%	1.23%
Native American or Alaska Native alone (NH)	91	106	105	0.27%	0.23%	0.16%
Asian alone (NH)	2,678	8,841	24,122	7.85%	19.31%	35.76%
Pacific Islander alone (NH)	30	46	59	0.09%	0.10%	0.09%
Other race alone (NH)	60	96	280	0.18%	0.21%	0.42%
Mixed race or multiracial (NH)	758	1,551	3,795	2.22%	3.39%	5.63%
Hispanic or Latino (any race)	853	1,804	3,615	2.50%	3.94%	5.36%
Total	34,104	45,780	67,455	100.00%	100.00%	100.00%

=== 2020 census ===
As of the 2020 census, Sammamish had a population of 67,455, 21,895 households, and 18,861 families residing in the city. The median age was 38.9 years, with 29.7% of residents under the age of 18, 6.1% under 5, and 9.2% 65 or older. For every 100 females there were 99.2 males, and for every 100 females age 18 and over there were 97.0 males age 18 and over; 51.1% of the population was female.

Of those households, 52.4% had children under the age of 18 living in them, 77.4% were married-couple households, 8.1% were households with a male householder and no spouse or partner present, and 11.9% were households with a female householder and no spouse or partner present. About 10.9% of all households were made up of individuals and 3.4% had someone living alone who was 65 years of age or older.

The population density was 3,302.9 inhabitants per square mile (1,275.3/km^{2}). There were 22,544 housing units at an average density of 1,103.9 per square mile (426.2/km^{2}), of which 2.9% were vacant. The homeowner vacancy rate was 0.6% and the rental vacancy rate was 3.4%. 100.0% of residents lived in urban areas, while 0.0% lived in rural areas.

The racial makeup of the city was 52.6% White, 1.3% Black or African American, 0.2% American Indian and Alaska Native, 35.8% Asian, 0.1% Native Hawaiian and Other Pacific Islander, 1.4% from some other race, and 8.5% from two or more races. Hispanic or Latino people of any race were 5.4% of the population.

Racial composition as of the 2020 census
Race	Number	Percent
White	35,490	52.6%
Black or African American	863	1.3%
American Indian and Alaska Native	141	0.2%
Asian	24,164	35.8%
Native Hawaiian and Other Pacific Islander	65	0.1%
Some other race	972	1.4%
Two or more races	5,760	8.5%
Hispanic or Latino (of any race)	3,615	5.4%

=== 2010 census ===
As of the 2010 census, there were 45,780 people, 15,154 households, and 12,918 families residing in the city. The population density was 2,512.2 inhabitants per square mile (970.0/km^{2}). There were 15,736 housing units at an average density of 863.7 per square mile (333.5/km^{2}). The racial makeup of the city was 74.72% White, 0.96% African American, 0.28% Native American, 19.34% Asian, 0.10% Pacific Islander, 0.86% from some other races and 3.74% from two or more races. Hispanic or Latino people of any race were 3.94% of the population.

There were 15,154 households, of which 52.9% had children under the age of 18 living with them, 76.9% were married couples living together, 5.6% had a female householder with no husband present, 2.7% had a male householder with no wife present, and 14.8% were non-families. 11.4% of all households were made up of individuals, and 2.1% had someone living alone who was 65 years of age or older. The average household size was 3.01 and the average family size was 3.28.

The median age in the city was 37.7 years. 32.2% of residents were under the age of 18; 4.9% were between the ages of 18 and 24; 27.9% were from 25 to 44; 29.4% were from 45 to 64; and 5.7% were 65 years of age or older. The gender makeup of the city was 50.1% male and 49.9% female.

== Parks ==
Sammamish has over ten parks (Beaver Lake Park and Beaver Lake Preserve, Big Rock Park North/Central/South, East Sammamish Park, Ebright Creek Park, Evans Creek Preserve, Klahanie Park, NE Sammamish Park, Pine Lake Park, Sammamish Commons, Sammamish Landing). Soaring Eagle Regional Park and Duthie Hill Park are on the plateau. Illahee Park Trail is an eight acre property that has a trail, wetlands, and a pond. East Lake Sammamish Trail runs along the eastern side of Lake Sammamish and connects to a regional trail system, like the Sammamish River Trail to the north, and the Issaquah-Preston Trail to the south.

East Sammamish Park in the northwest of the city came with it in 1999.

== Government ==
The Sammamish City Council is elected by the community. Of the seven council members, two members are elected as Mayor and Deputy Mayor. Council meetings are held at City Hall, part of the Sammamish Commons, which is also the site of Sammamish Library, a branch of the King County Library System.

Sammamish does not have its own post office; the closest one is in Redmond. Eastside Fire and Rescue is contracted to provide fire services. Sammamish contracts with the King County Sheriff's Office for police services. Deputies assigned to Sammamish wear city uniforms and drive patrol cars marked with the city logo.

== Education ==
Sammamish's public school system is primarily served by two school districts.

Everything north of Southeast 8th Street is served by Lake Washington School District, and has two high schools (Eastlake, Tesla STEM), two middle schools (Inglewood, Renaissance School of Art and Reasoning), and five elementary schools (Elizabeth Blackwell, Rachel Carson, Christa McAuliffe, Margaret Mead, Samantha Smith).

Everything south of Southeast 8th Street is served by Issaquah School District, and has two high schools (Issaquah, Skyline), three middle schools (Beaver Lake, Pacific Cascade, Pine Lake), and seven elementary schools (Cascade Ridge, Cedar Trails, Challenger, Creekside, Discovery, Endeavour, Sunny Hills).

A very small portion to the east is in the Snoqualmie Valley School District.

Eastside Catholic School is a private school in the city.

Central Washington University is a public university that opened a Sammamish location on September 20, 2017.

== Transportation ==
Sammamish is served by several major north–south roads: East Lake Sammamish Parkway along the lake shore, 228th Avenue through the business district, and Issaquah-Pine Lake Road. Southeast 4th Street connects 228th Avenue to the city's town center. To the north and east of the city is State Route 202, providing access to Redmond, and to the south is Interstate 90 in Issaquah. A regional freeway, Interstate 605, has been proposed several times since the 1960s to run through Sammamish, but has not been built.

Bus service is provided by King County Metro, which operates a route that connects Sammamish to Redmond, Issaquah, and Mercer Island station on the 2 Line. The city formerly had direct service to Downtown Seattle from a Sound Transit Express route and Metro's express buses during peak hours. South Sammamish Park and Ride is the city's transit center with 265 parking stalls. Metro began running dial-a-ride buses to the Sammamish Plateau in 1993, and it later extended commuter services in the early 2000s.

The King County government started construction of an 11-mile (18 km) bike trail on the east side of Lake Sammamish in 1998. It was completed in 2023, replacing a disused railway.

== Notable people ==
- Hunter Bryant, professional American football player
- Blake Hawksworth, professional baseball player
- Surf Mesa, musician
- Simone Rose, professional artistic gymnast
- Kim Schrier, U.S. congresswoman
- Matisse Thybulle, professional basketball player
