= Yellow Lake (Michigan) =

- Location within Michigan
- Location: Berrien County
- Coordinates: 41°50′19″N 86°26′30″W
- Type: lake
- Surface area: 34.706 acres (14.045 ha)

Yellow Lake is a lake in Berrien County, in the U.S. state of Michigan. It has an area of 34.706 acres (14.045 ha).

Yellow Lake was so named on account of the yellowish tint of the water.
