= Alternative Livelihood =

Social programs to target drugs and poverty simultaneously

Alternative Livelihood Programs are the name given to government attempts, especially in South America to replace the illicit cultivation of banned substances, such as opium or coca, with alternative, legal crops or other activities as a source of income.

Alternative Livelihood has sometimes been referred as Alternative Development.
