= Yellow Lake (Sammamish, Washington) =

Lake in Sammamish, Washington

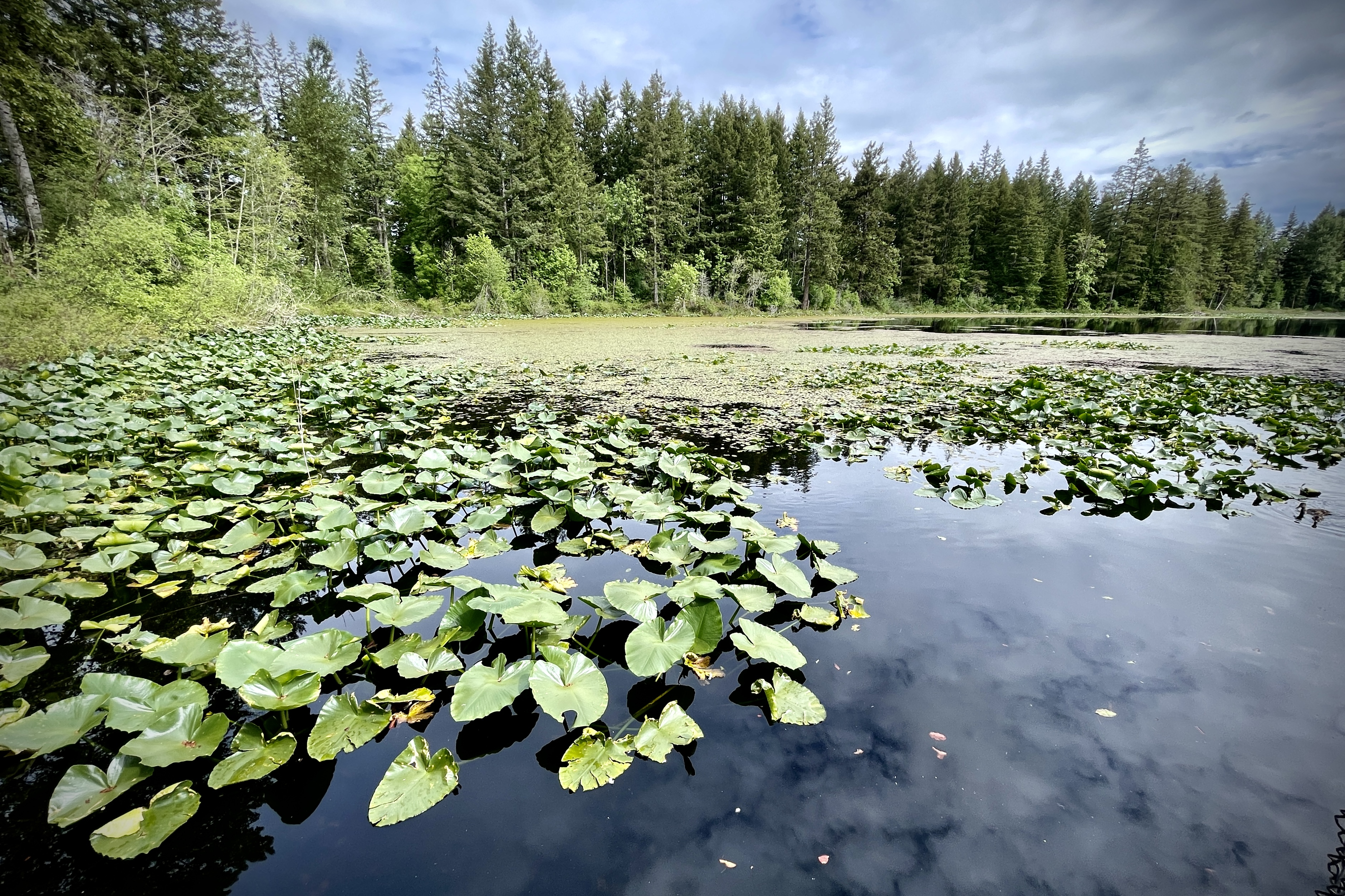
- View of Yellow Lake

- Location within Washington (state) Location within the United States
- Location: Sammamish, Washington
- Coordinates: 47.571334°N 122.012895°W
- Basin countries: United States
- Surface area: 10 acres (4.0 ha)

Yellow Lake is a small lake in the Klahanie neighborhood of Sammamish, Washington. The lake sits within a forested area, next to Klahanie Park.

== Description ==
Yellow Lake is located within Klahanie, a planned community that was annexed by Sammamish in 2016. The lake was named for its yellow water lilies, it is surrounded by a forested buffer strip, serving as an urban wildlife sanctuary. Due to this abundant habitat, it supports many birds and other wildlife. It is encircled by a walking trail.

The lake has not been monitored for nutrient levels since 2004, but those measurements indicate that it is borderline eutrophic. The lake has a 257-acre (104 ha) watershed, entirely within Klahanie. North Fork Issaquah Creek is the outflow of Yellow Lake.
