= Taal Volcano Main Crater Lake =

Lake in Batangas, Philippines

Main Crater Lake
- Yellow Lake
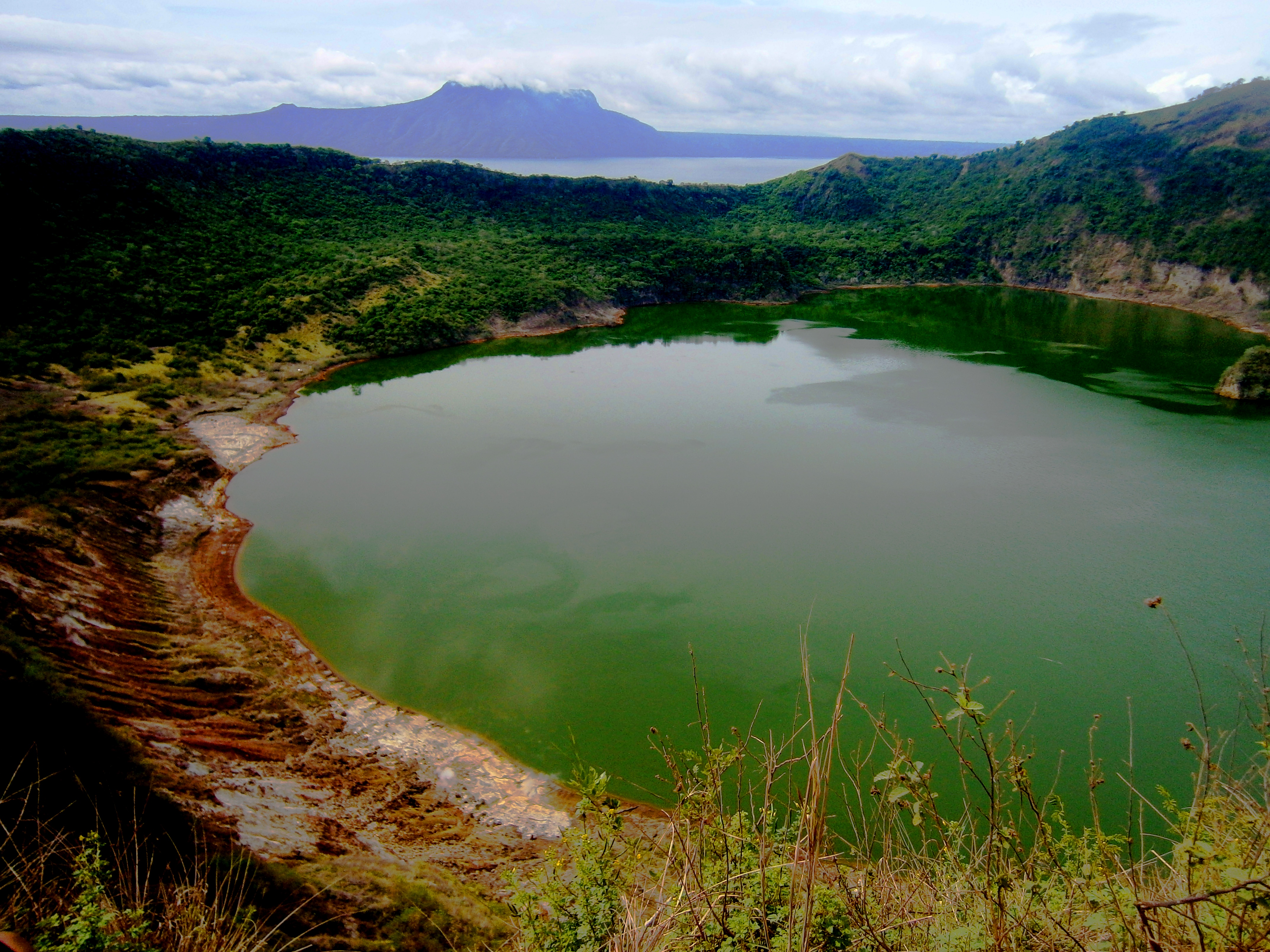
- The lake prior to the 2020 eruption of Taal Volcano

- Location within the Philippines
- Location: Batangas
- Coordinates: 14°00′35″N 120°59′54″E
- Type: Crater lake
- Primary inflows: Taal Lake
- Primary outflows: Taal Lake
- Catchment area: Taal Lake
- Basin countries: Philippines
- Max. length: 1 km (0.62 mi)
- Max. width: 1.9 km (1.2 mi)
- Surface area: 1.2 km^{2} (0.46 sq mi)
- Average depth: 100 m (330 ft)
- Max. depth: 172 m (564 ft)
- Water volume: 24.256×10^{9} m^{3} (856.6×10^{9} cu ft)
- Shore length^{1}: 115 km (71 mi)
- Surface elevation: 4 m (13 ft)
- Islands: Vulcan Point (until 2020); Unnamed island
- Settlements: San Nicolas; Talisay
- ^{1} Shore length is not a well-defined measure.

Taal Volcano Main Crater Lake (IPA: [taʔal]; or simply Main Crater Lake), historically known as Yellow Lake, is a lake inside the main crater of Taal Volcano in the Philippines. The origin of the lake is uncertain but is thought to have formed by rainwater. The lake briefly disappeared after the 2020 eruption of Taal Volcano.

There is an island inside of Main Crater Lake, called Vulcan Point.

== History ==
=== Disappearance ===
After the January 12, 2020, eruption of Taal Volcano, satellite images showed that the water in Main Crater Lake had disappeared. Although the main cause of its disappearance is unknown, it is suggested that the water must have dried up due to the fissures that formed after the eruption. The lava beneath the volcano may also have contributed to the evaporation of the lake.

After Taal Volcano calmed down, a series of typhoons allowed rain to re-accumulate and reform Main Crater Lake.

== Geography ==
=== Vulcan Point ===
Vulcan Point
- Location within Philippines

Geography
- Location: Taal Volcano
- Coordinates: 14°00′35″N 120°59′54″E
- Adjacent to: Main Crater Lake

Administration
- Philippines
- Region: Calabarzon
- Province: Batangas
- Municipalities: San Nicolas

Demographics
- Population: 0 (uninhabited)

Vulcan Point Island, or simply Vulcan Point, is a small rocky island inside of Main Crater Lake which was once covered with vegetation before the 2020 eruption, which it survived. It is one of only a few islands in a lake on an island in a lake on an island in the world. It projects from the surface underneath Main Crater Lake, which was the remnant of the old crater floor that was filled in by the lake.
