= Hannegan caldera =

Geologic caldera in Washington (state)

Coordinates: 48°52′24″N 121°30′33″W

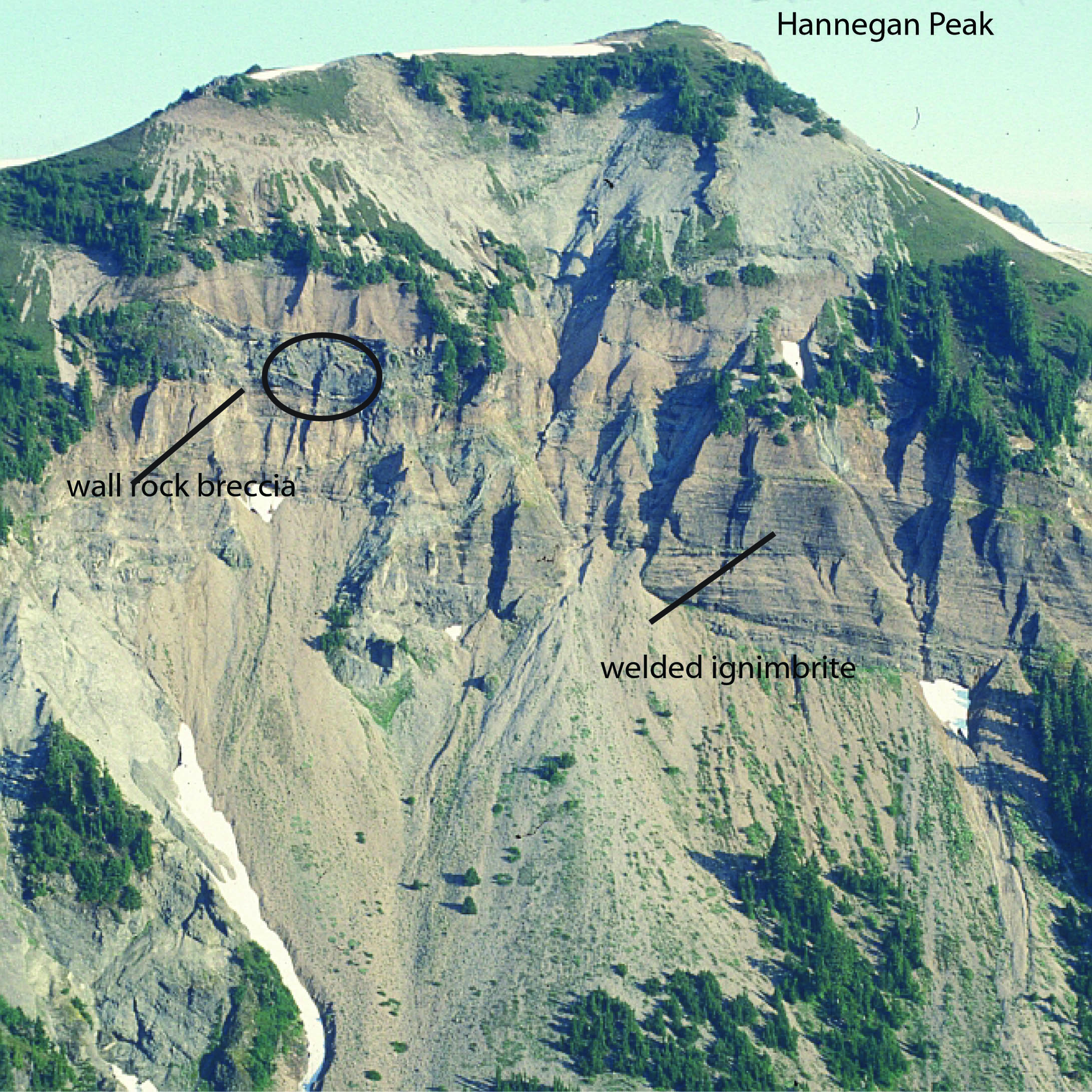
South face of Hannegan Peak from Hannegan Pass showing intracaldera structures. A 10-m breccia block is circled.

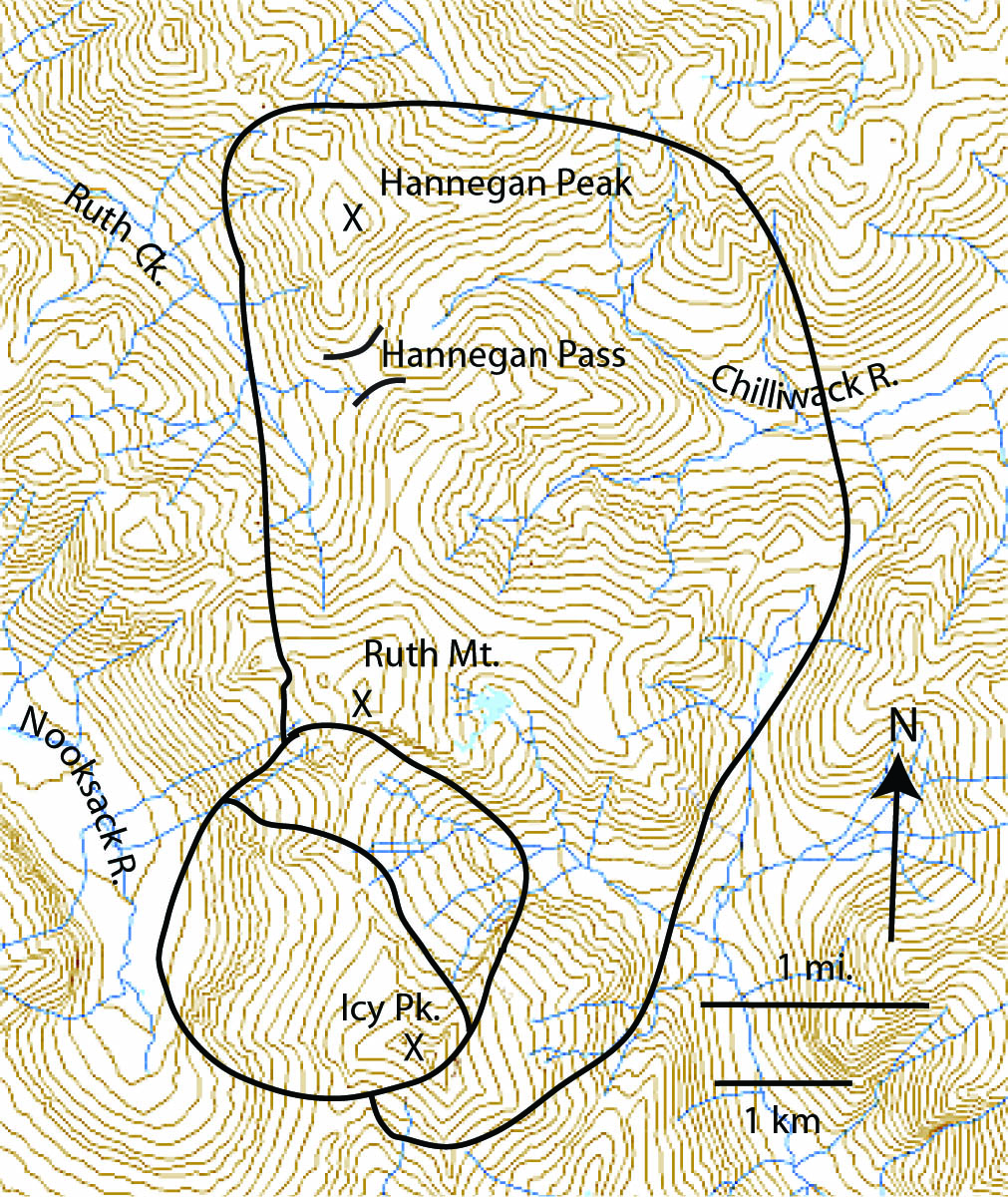
Outline map of Hannegan caldera in the North Cascades. Postcaldera plutons intrude the southwest portion of the caldera.

The Hannegan caldera is a 3.72 million-year-old volcanic collapse structure in the North Cascades of the U.S. state of Washington. The caldera collapsed during two separate volcanic eruptions that produced as much as 140 km^{3} (34 mi^{3}) of rhyolite ash.

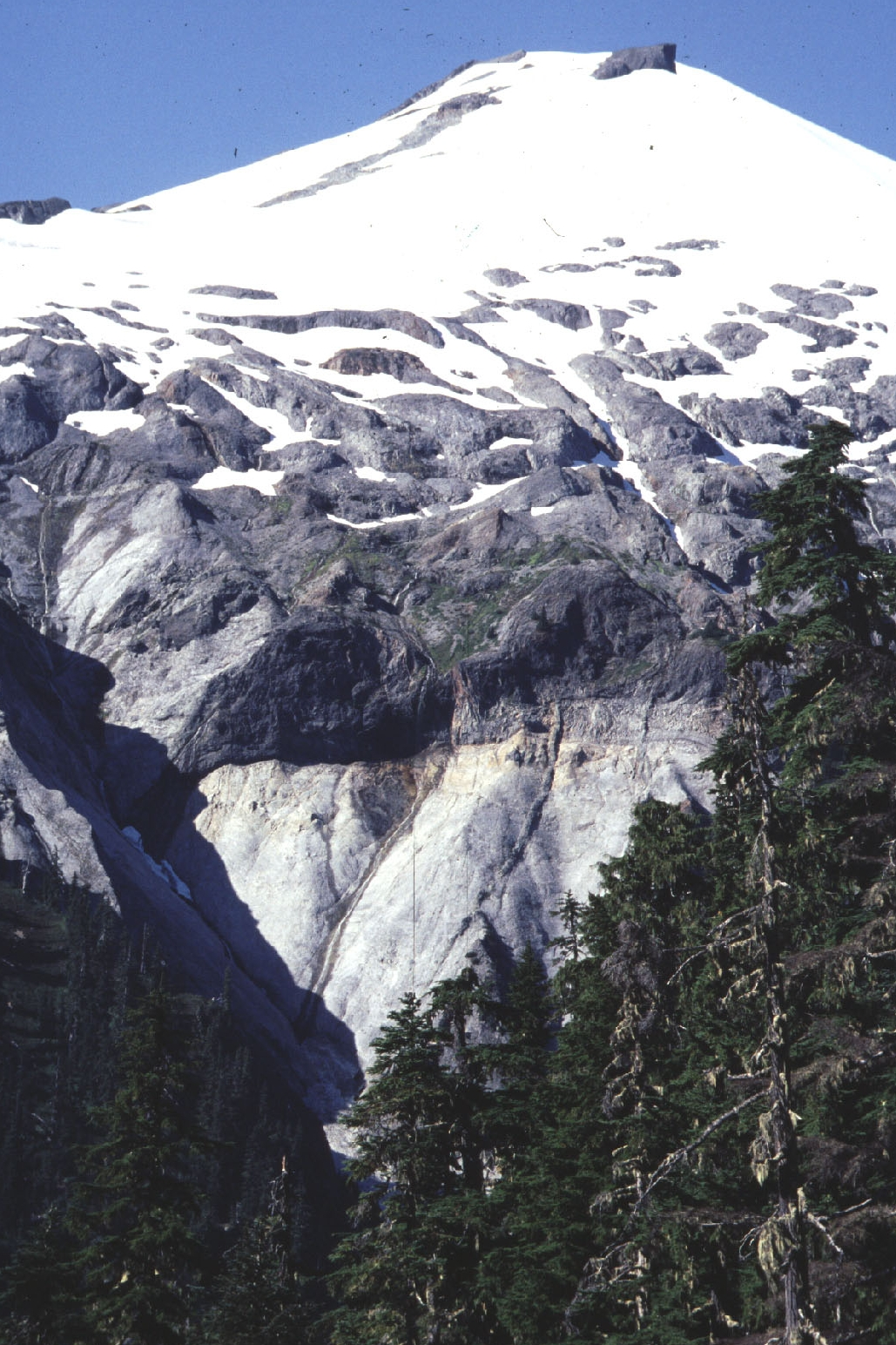
The contact between the darker ignimbrite of Ruth Mountain and the pale ignimbrite of Hannegan Peak 1.4 km (0.87 mi) northeast of Ruth Mountain (skyline) in the Hannegan caldera.

The caldera is filled with 55–60 km^{3} (13–14 mi^{3}) of tuff consisting of ignimbrite, wall-rock breccia, and post-caldera sedimentary rocks. Rocks filling the caldera are lumped into a stratigraphic unit called the Hannegan volcanics. This geologic unit is subdivided into the ignimbrite of Hannegan Peak, which is overlain by the slightly younger ignimbrite of Ruth Mountain. Hannegan caldera is centered 8.9 km (5.5 mi) northeast of Mount Shuksan. Prominent geographic points within the caldera include Hannegan Peak, Hannegan Pass, Ruth Mountain, Icy Peak, the western portion of Copper Ridge and the uppermost reaches of the Chilliwack River. The caldera's western margin is in Mount Baker-Snoqualmie National Forest but most of the structure is in North Cascades National Park. The caldera is traversed by portions of the Hannegan Pass, Hannegan Peak, Chillwack River, Copper Ridge, and Boundary trails, but most of it is in untracked and rugged mountainous terrain. It is among the best exposed and youngest trap door calderas in the world, and is believed to be the only described double trapdoor caldera on Earth.

== Geologic history ==
=== Pre-caldera volcanism and topography ===
The entire region has been deeply eroded by repeated continental and alpine glaciations. No volcanic structures or rocks predating caldera collapse survived multiple glaciations and collapse of the caldera. However, the presence of volcanic rock fragments within the intracaldera tuff are evidence for pre-caldera volcanism, as are dikes outside the caldera margin that have geochemical compositions distinct from rocks related to caldera collapse and later volcanism within the caldera.

=== First caldera collapse ===
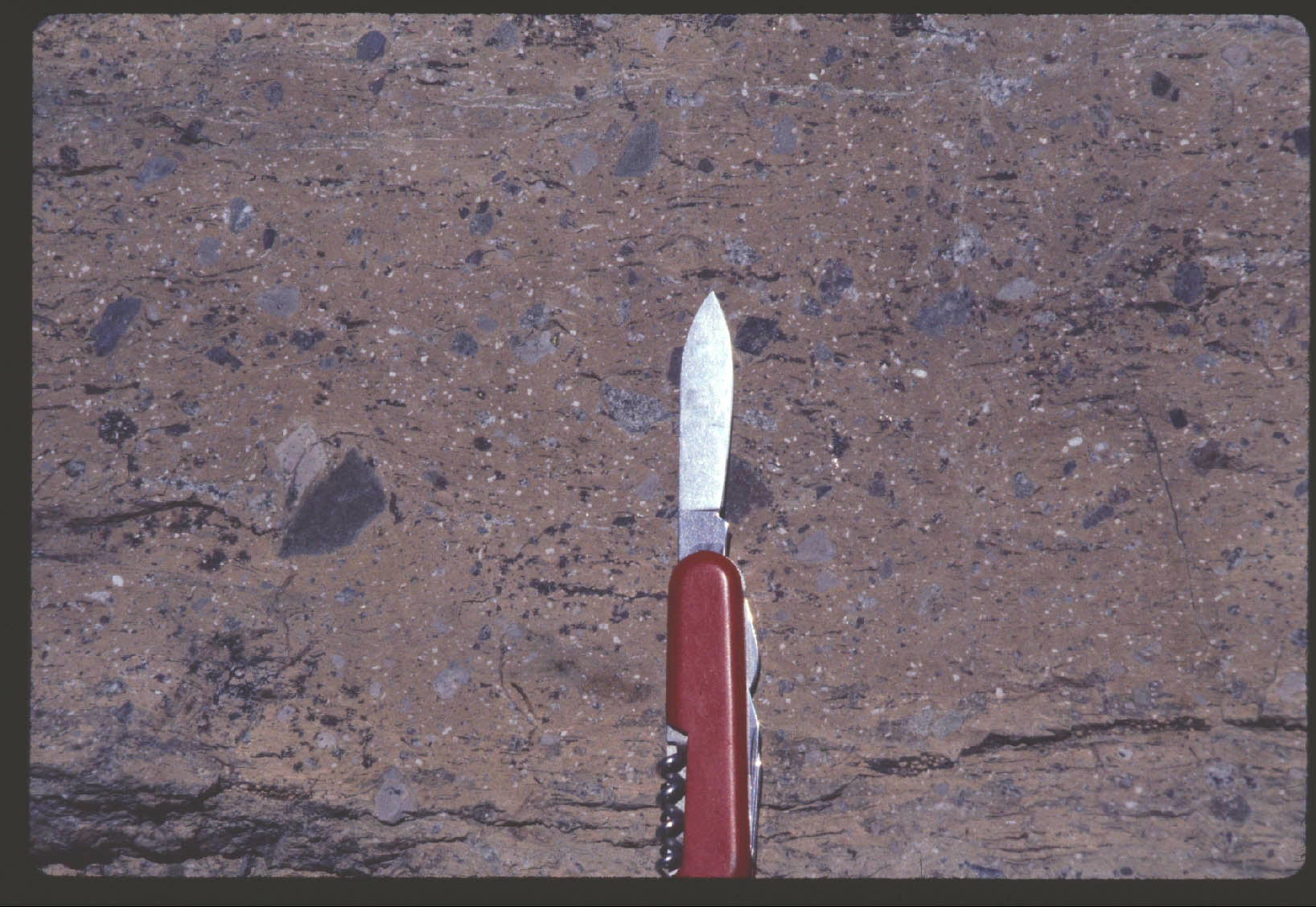
Welded tuff, or ignimbrite, on Hannegan Peak. Knifepoints to fiamme, pumice clasts flattened by compaction of hot pyroclastic flows.

Around 4 million years ago large volumes rhyolitic magma rose high into the crust. This intrusion most likely caused the surface to dome upwards. Fractures caused by this deformation may have provided conduits for some magma to reach the surface and erupt into relatively small volcanic structures such as felsic and intermediate lava flows and domes, cinder cones, and perhaps small stratovolcanoes. Over 10s or 100s of thousands of years, this upward deformation eventually resulted in a semicircular fracture, or ring fault to form in the brittle crust. This fault encircled the northern margin of the uplifted area and reaching down to the magma chamber, causing sudden release of confining pressure on the magma. Consequently, the magma erupted huge volumes of magma as towering columns of volcanic ash and pumice, as well as pyroclastic flows. As the magma emptied, the surface collapsed in a trapdoor fashion down to the north, with the hinge on the south. Though no longer preserved due to millions of years of intense erosion, searing pyroclastic flows must have swept for 10s of kilometers down river valleys beyond the margins of the caldera, incinerating everything in their path. As the surface subsidized a kilometer or more during eruption, volcanic ash filled the resulting horseshoe-shaped caldera. Rock outside the ring fault slid inward as large landslides and left lenses of wall rock breccias and megabreccia interbedded in the tuff filling the collapsing caldera. This tuff, erupted in a single eruption, was lithified and is preserved as the ignimbrite of Hannegan Peak; it is at least 900 meters (3,000 ft) thick with no base is exposed. It is confined within the northern half of the caldera's structural margin. A relatively precise ^{40}Ar/^{30}Ar radiometric age dates this unit to 3.722 +/- 0.020 million years ago. This northern portion of the Hannegan caldera is confined to the area between Ruth Mountain and Hannegan Peak, and includes the upper most portion of the Chilliwack River valley.

=== Hiatus and sedimentation ===
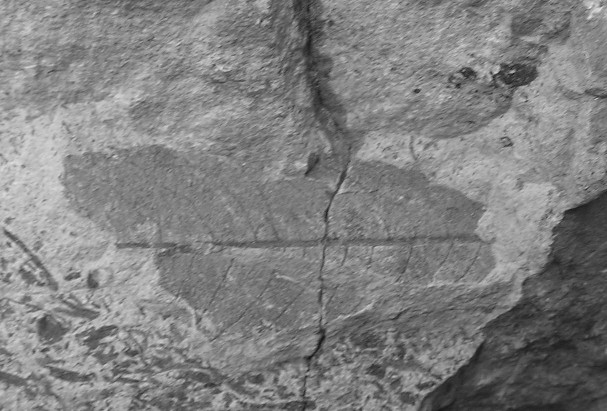
Fossil Pliocene leaf, 8-cm-long, in intracaldera lake sediment in Hannegan caldera.

Collapse probably took place over a few days. At some time, a lake formed in the depression, and fine grained sediment was deposited on its floor, preserved on the northern flank of Ruth Mountain today as shale and sandstone. These rocks contain fossil leaves, and remain undated.

=== Second caldera collapse ===
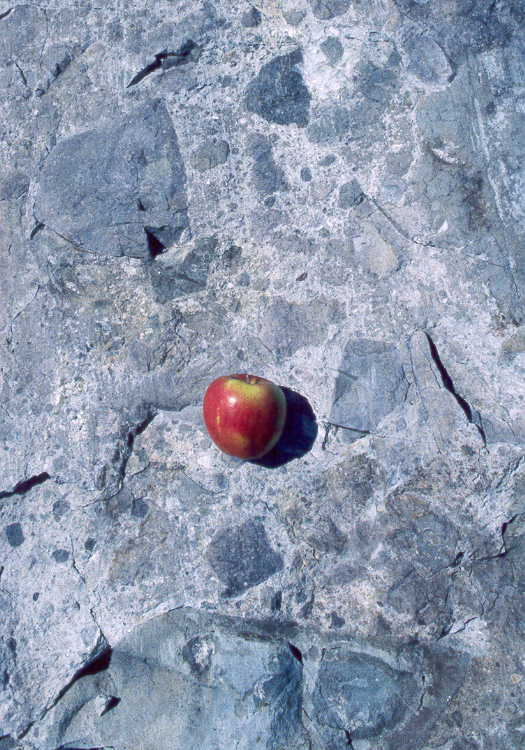
Volcanic clasts characterize the ignimbrite of Ruth Mountain. The gray matrix is fine grained volcanic ash erupted during the second collapse of the Hannegan caldera. This outcrop is on the east shoulder of Ruth Mountain. The apple is for scale.

A large volume of unerupted magma remained within the crust, and may have been augmented by subsequent intrusions. After only a brief interval, continued deformation caused the northern ring fault to propagate southward to form an oblong oval above the remaining magma, which again erupted in another cataclysmic eruption. The southern portion of the caldera then collapsed, this time in a down-to-the-south trapdoor fashion. This formed a 'double-trap door caldera', a unique geologic structure. The second portion of the Hannegan collapse was filled with the ignimbrite of Ruth Mountain, exposed from the northeast flank of Ruth Mountain to the southeast flank of Icy Peak to the south. The Ruth Mountain ignimbrite contains many clasts of volcanic rock that predates caldera collapse. This unit must have covered the northern portion of the caldera as well, but was stripped away in that section by erosion. No rock suitable for dating has been found in this unit.

=== Post-collapse pluton intrusions ===
Two granodiorite magma bodies invaded the Ruth Mountain ignimbrite, and are exposed today as a pair of plutons on Icy Peak and the eastern wall of Nooksack Cirque. The older of these granitic masses is dated to 3.42 million years old, and therefore confines the rock filing the second episode of caldera collapse to the geologically brief 300,000 thousand year interval between the Hannegan ignimbrite (3.72 million years) and 3.42 million years for the pluton. It is likely the Ruth Mountain ignimbrite is much closer to the older age. The second small pluton closely followed, and is 3.36 million years old. Both are part of the Chilliwack Batholith. Mineral analyses from these plutons indicate they cooled at least 1 km (0.62 mi) below the surface. Yet they are both exposed today due to erosion. They outcrop at the summit of Icy Peak (2,156 m (7,073 ft)) and to within a few hundred feet of the summit of Ruth Mountain (2,169 m (7,116 ft)), the highest point within the caldera. This indicates profound erosion of at least 1 km (0.62 mi) of intracaldera volcanic rocks in the 3.36 million years since intrusion of these plutons, including any volcanic deposits that may have been associated with the plutons.

=== The end of volcanic activity in the caldera ===
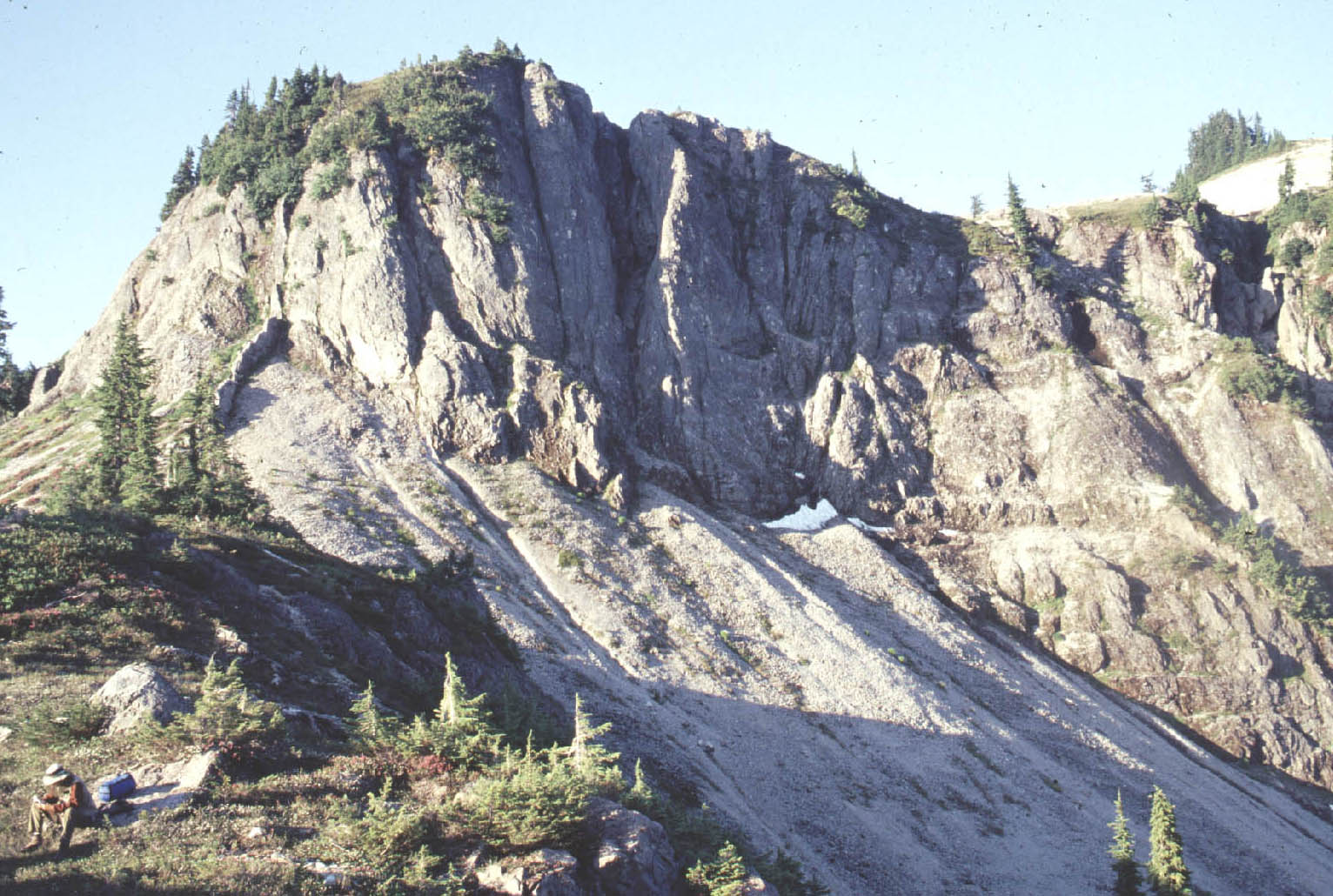
This 240-m thick stack of andesite lava west of Chilliwack Pass in Hannegan caldera is dated to 2.96 million years old. It is the youngest dated rock in the Hannegan volcanics inside the Hannegan caldera. Note geologist in lower left.

Dikes and small rhyolite pods intruded the intracaldera tuff after the caldera collapse was complete. A few small outcrops of andesitic rock are scattered within the caldera, the remnants of lava flows. One sequence of three lava flows exposed on the ridge crest between Ruth Mountain and Chilliwack Pass has a preserved thickness of 240 meters and is dated to 2.96 +/- 0.30 million years old. It is the youngest dated rock unit within the Hannegan volcanics. Following the end of magmatism in the Hannegan area, the focus of magma intrusion and volcanism migrated to the southwest, and sequentially emplaced the Lake Ann Stock (2.75 million years old), Kulshan caldera (1.15 million years old), and the numerous vents in the Mount Baker Volcanic field, including the currently active Mount Baker itself.

== Comparison with other Cascades calderas ==
The few known Cascade calderas are small and erupted relatively small volumes of ash and ignimbrite. Hannegan caldera is only 8 km × 3.5 km (5.0 mi × 2.2 mi) in outline, with a calculated eruption volume of 55–60 km^{3} (13–14 cu mi) of magma. Only three calderas have formed in the Cascades since the collapse at Hannegan, and each erupted about the same volume of magma as Hannegan. The Kulshan caldera (1.11 million years old) is 4 km × 8 km (2.5 mi × 5.0 mi). The best known and youngest Cascade Range caldera is at 7700 year old Crater Lake, 8 km × 10 km (5.0 mi × 6.2 mi). The little known 600,000 year old Rockland caldera underlies Lassen Peak volcanic center. It is 600,000 years old and is estimated to measure 6 km × 6 km (3.7 mi × 3.7 mi). Two other much older Cascade calderas have been sufficiently described in the geologic literature to include here. These are the 21 million-year-old Coquihalla caldera east of Hope, British Columbia, (approx 6 km × 6 km (3.7 mi × 3.7 mi)) and the 25 million year old Mount Aix caldera (6 km × 9 km (3.7 mi × 5.6 mi)) 40 km (25 mi) east of Mount Rainier.

== See also ==
- Dave Tucker (geologist)
