= Mount Baker =

Mountain in Washington state, United States

- Kulshan or Koma Kulshan
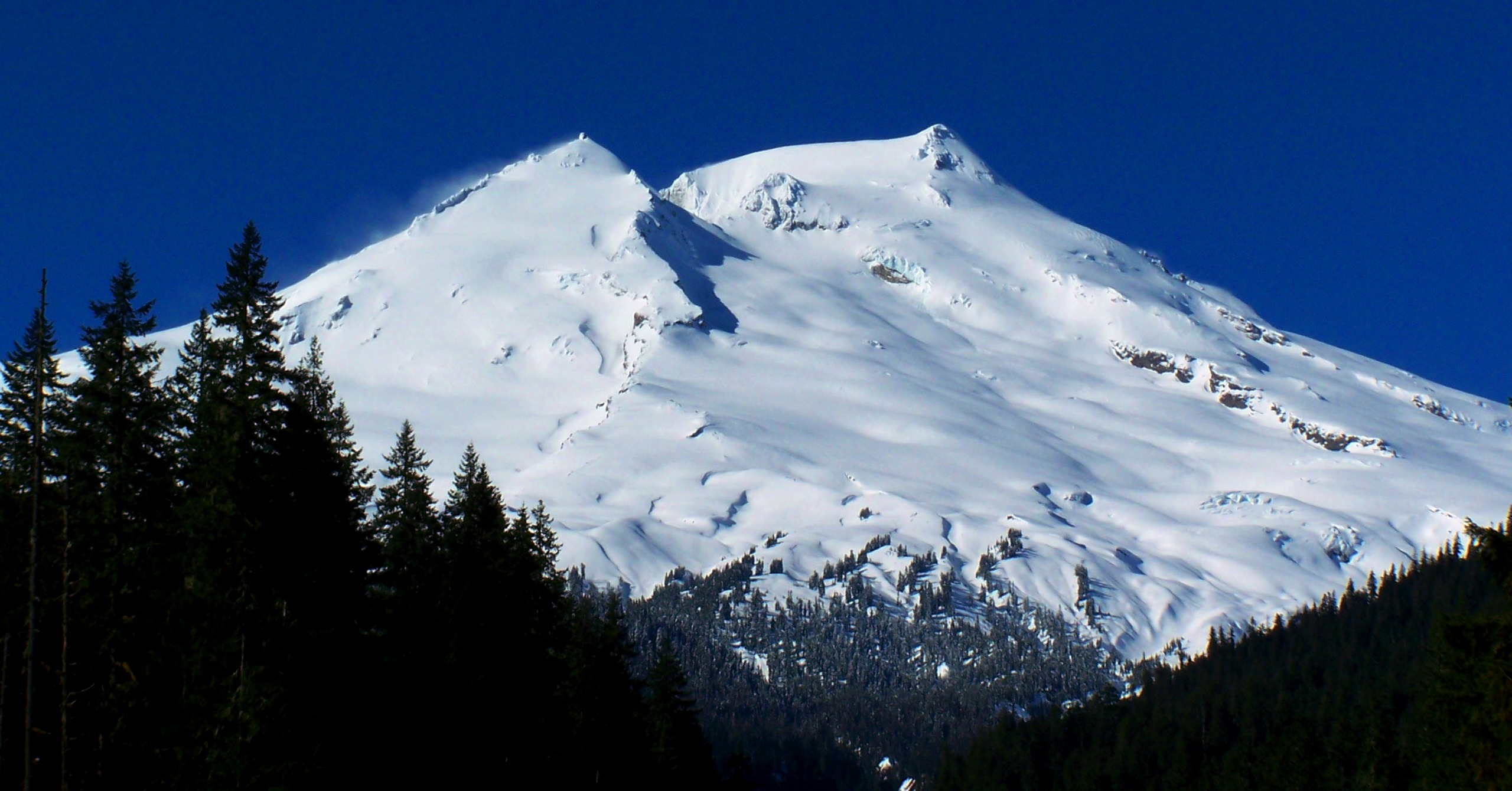
- Mount Baker as seen from the Southeast at Boulder Creek

Highest point
- Elevation: 10,786 ft (3,288 m) NAVD 88
- Prominence: 8,812 ft (2,686 m)
- Isolation: 211.66 km (131.52 mi)
- Listing: North America prominent peak 28th; North America isolated peaks 98th; Cascade volcanoes
- Coordinates: 48°46′36″N 121°48′52″W

Naming
- Etymology: Joseph Baker
- Native name: Kweq' Smánit (Nooksack); təqʷubəʔ (Lushootseed); Kwelshan (Lummi); Kwelxá:lxw (Halkomelem); kʷəlhéləxʷ (Thompson)

Geography
- Location within Washington (state)
- Location: Whatcom County, Washington State, U.S.
- Parent range: Cascade Range
- Topo map: USGS Mount Baker

Geology
- Formed by: Subduction zone volcanism
- Rock age: Less than 140,000 years
- Mountain type: Stratovolcano
- Volcanic arc: Cascade Volcanic Arc
- Last eruption: 7 September to 27 November 1880

Climbing
- First ascent: 1868 by Edmund Coleman, John Tennant, Thomas Stratton and David Ogilvy
- Easiest route: snow (ice) climb

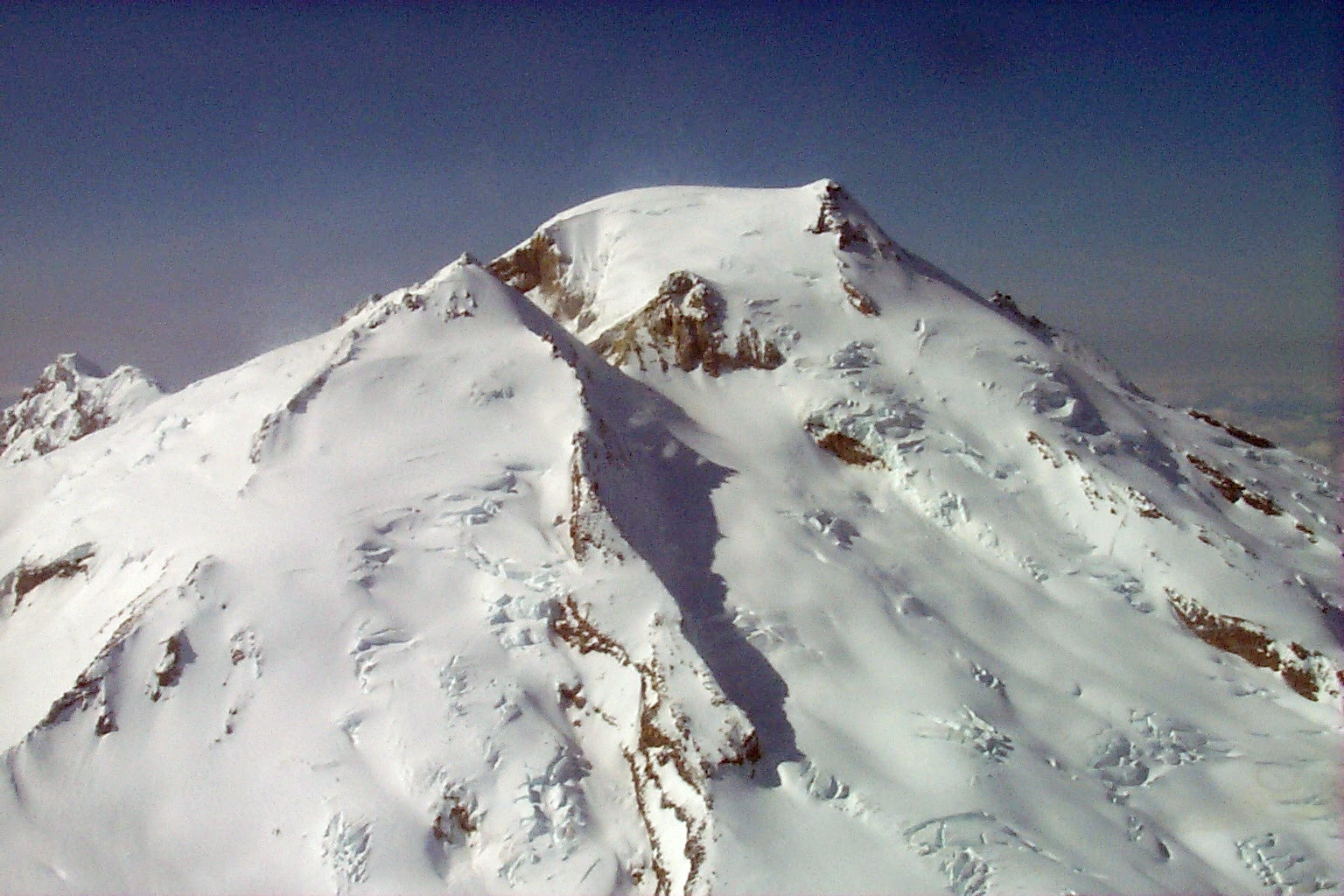
The east side of Mount Baker in 2001. Sherman Crater is the deep depression south of the summit.

Mount Baker, (Note: Indigenous peoples around the mountain have names for it in their languages: Nooksack: Kweq' Smánit, Kwelshán, or Spelhpálhx̠en; Lushootseed: təqʷubəʔ; Straits Salish: Kwelshan; Halkomelem: Kwelxá:lxw; Thompson: kʷəlhéləxʷ) also known as Koma Kulshan or simply Kulshan, is a 10,781-foot (3,286 m) active glacier-covered andesitic stratovolcano in the Cascade Volcanic Arc and the North Cascades of Washington State in the United States. Mount Baker has the second-most thermally active crater in the Cascade Range after Mount St. Helens. About 30 miles (48 km) due east of the city of Bellingham, Whatcom County, Mount Baker is the youngest volcano in the Mount Baker volcanic field. While volcanism has persisted here for some 1.5 million years, the current volcanic cone is likely no more than 140,000 years old, and possibly no older than 80–90,000 years. Older volcanic edifices have mostly eroded away due to glaciation.

After Mount Rainier, Mount Baker has the heaviest glacier cover of the Cascade Range volcanoes; the volume of snow and ice on Mount Baker, 0.43 cu mi (1.79 km^{3}) is greater than that of all the other Cascades volcanoes (except Rainier) combined. It is also one of the snowiest places in the world; in 1999, Mount Baker Ski Area, located 9 mi (14.5 km) to the northeast, set the world record for recorded snowfall in a single season—1,140 in (29 m; 95 ft).

Mount Baker is the third-highest mountain in Washington and the fifth-highest in the Cascade Range, if Little Tahoma Peak, a subpeak of Mount Rainier, and Shastina, a subpeak of Mount Shasta, are not counted. Located in the Mount Baker Wilderness, it is visible from much of Greater Victoria, Nanaimo, and Greater Vancouver in British Columbia, and to the south, from Seattle (and on clear days Tacoma) in Washington.

Indigenous peoples have known the mountain for thousands of years, but the first written record of the mountain is from Spanish explorer Gonzalo Lopez de Haro, who mapped it in 1790 as Gran Montaña del Carmelo. The explorer George Vancouver later named the mountain for 3rd Lieutenant Joseph Baker of HMS Discovery, who saw it on April 30, 1792.

== Name and etymology ==
Mount Baker is known to the several Indigenous peoples surrounding the mountain by different names.

The Nooksack, who live in the closest proximity to the north face of the mountain, have multiple names for different areas of the mountain. The name Kweq' Smánit, meaning "white mountain," refers to Mount Baker as a whole, and specifically, to the glacier-covered summit above 7,000 feet. The open slopes of Mt. Baker, between about 5,000 feet and 7,000 feet, are known as Kwelshán, meaning "shooting place," referring to the act of going hunting up on the slopes. The third main name for the mountain is Spelhpálhx̠en, meaning "many meadows," refers to the sheltered meadows below around 5,500 feet.

The Upper Skagit peoples, who live in the closest proximity to the south face of the mountain along the Skagit River watershed, call the mountain təqʷubəʔ in Lushootseed, which means "permanently snow-covered mountain." This name is also used for Mount Rainier, and is anglicized as Tacoma or Tahoma.

Other Indigenous peoples, such as the Lummi or Halkomelem-speaking peoples, use names for the mountain borrowed from the Nooksack term, as, due to the distance to the mountain from the core homelands of those peoples, only those closely related to the Nooksack might travel to hunt and gather with them at Kwelshán. Thus, the names for Mount Baker in Lummi and Halkomelem are Kwelshan and Kwelxá:lxw respectively. The name in the nearby Thompson language, kʷəlhéləxʷ, may be a loan from Nooksack or Halkomelem.

The first Europeans to see and name the mountain were the Spanish. Gonzalo Lopez de Haro was the first European to record the mountain, calling it Gran Montaña del Carmelo, meaning "Great Mount Carmel".

The current English name for the mountain, Mount Baker, was chosen by George Vancouver. Vancouver named the mountain for 3rd Lieutenant Joseph Baker of HMS Discovery, who saw it on April 30, 1792.

Mount Baker is sometimes also known by the alternative English name "Kulshan" which is the anglicized form of the Nooksack name Kwelshán. The other related name, "Koma Kulshan," is likely the Anglicized version of the Nooksack phrase, Kwóma Kwelshán, meaning "go up into the mountains to Kwelshán."

== History ==
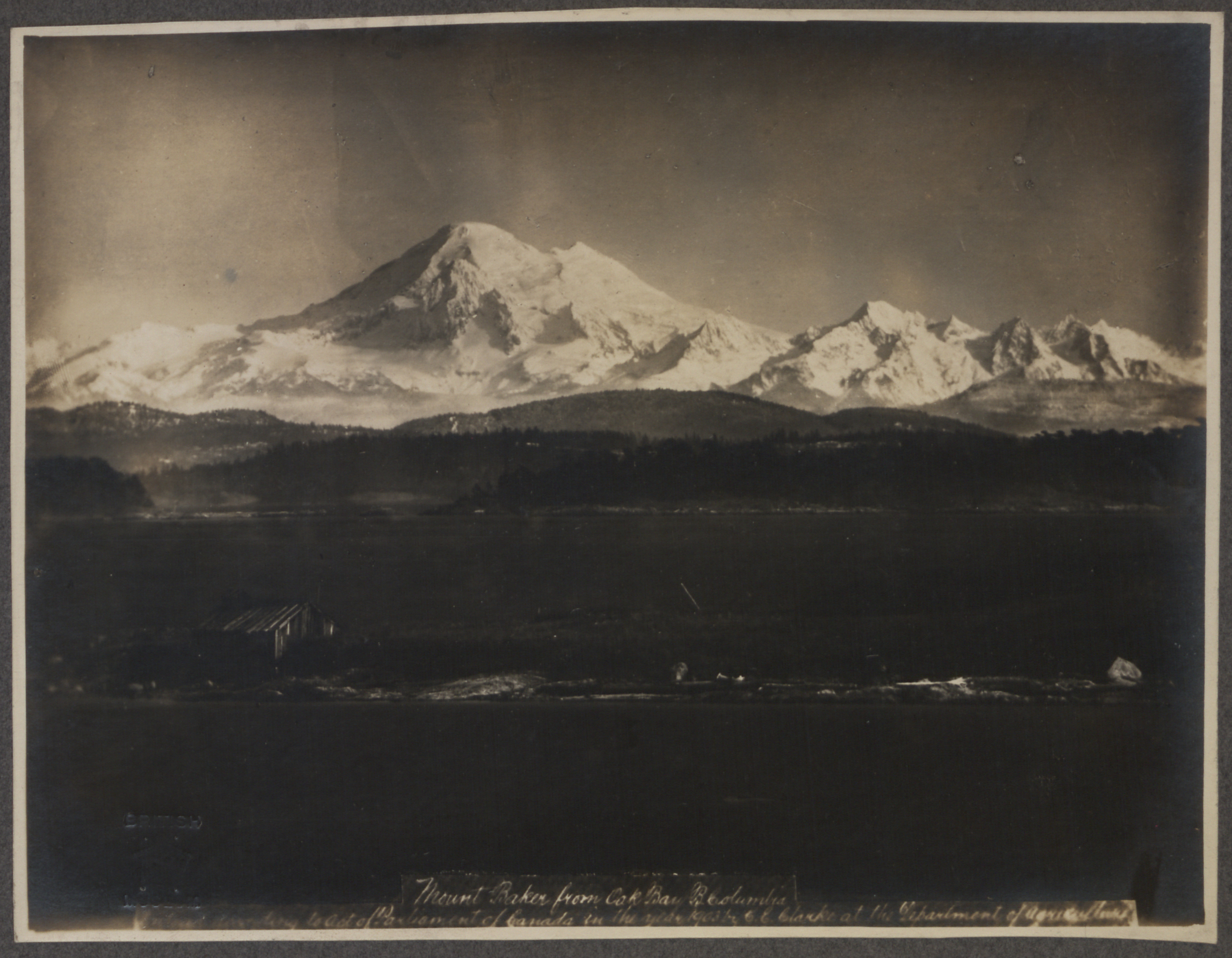
Mount Baker from Oak Bay, British Columbia, 1903, Photo: Charles Edward Clarke

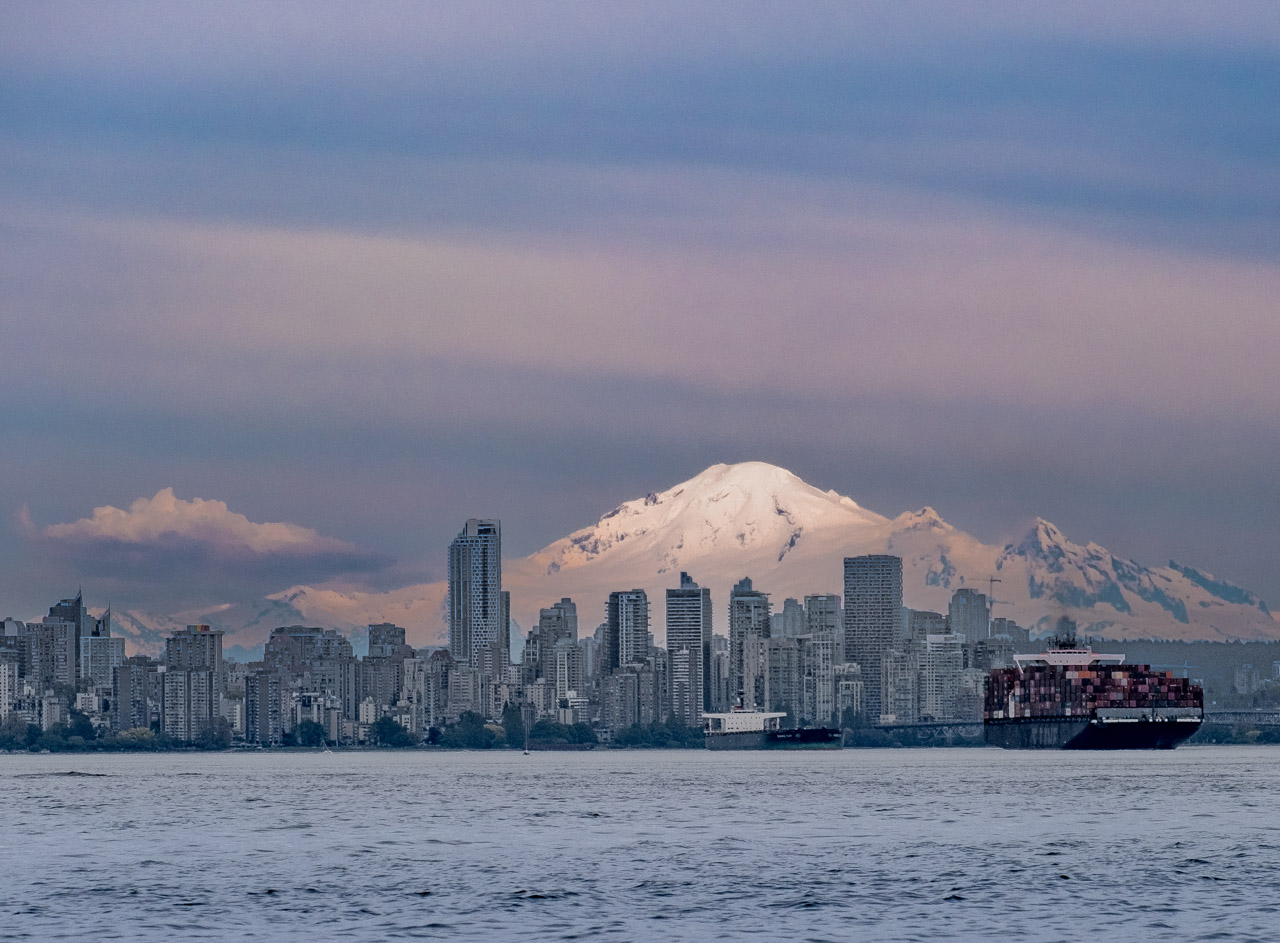
Mount Baker, photographed facing English Bay, looms over the residential towers of downtown Vancouver

Prior to European colonization, the Nooksack and Upper Skagit peoples hunted and gathered on the north and south faces of the mountain.

For the Nooksack, Mount Baker is extremely important in traditional religious beliefs, and was historically a great source of wealth (in the form of mountain goat wool, a highly prized commodity) and food. Nooksack families would travel via the North Fork (Nooksack: Chuw7álich) or Middle Fork (Nooksack: Nuxwt'íqw'em) of the Nooksack River to the alpine meadows where they would set up temporary summer camps to dry picked berries and meat. From those camps, people would disperse across the mountain to pick berries or hunt. The high slopes of the mountain were prime territory for hunting deer, elk, mountain goat, bear, marmot, and grouse. Nooksack families held almost exclusive usage rights to the northwestern areas of the mountain, while the usage rights to the southeastern half were held by Skagit families. Certain families of tribes such as the Lummi or Halkomelem-speaking peoples could travel to the mountain if they were intermarried and closely allied with Nooksack families. This meant that some groups which had more hostile relations with the Nooksack, such as the Thompson, were generally barred from the mountain.

In 1790, Manuel Quimper of the Spanish Navy set sail from Nootka, a temporary settlement on Vancouver Island, with orders to explore the newly discovered Strait of Juan de Fuca. Accompanying Quimper was first-pilot Gonzalo Lopez de Haro, who drew detailed charts during the six-week expedition. Although Quimper's journal of the voyage does not refer to the mountain, one of Haro's manuscript charts includes a sketch of Mount Baker. The Spanish named the snowy volcano La Gran Montana del Carmelo, as it reminded them of the white-clad monks of the Carmelite Monastery.

The British explorer George Vancouver left England a year later. His mission was to survey the northwest coast of North America. Vancouver and his crew reached the Pacific Northwest coast in 1792. While anchored in Dungeness Bay on the south shore of the Strait of Juan de Fuca, Joseph Baker made an observation of Mount Baker, which Vancouver recorded in his journal:

About this time a very high conspicuous craggy mountain ... presented itself, towering above the clouds: as low down as they allowed it to be visible it was covered with snow; and south of it, was a long ridge of very rugged snowy mountains, much less elevated, which seemed to stretch to a considerable distance ... the high distant land formed, as already observed, like detached islands, amongst which the lofty mountain, discovered in the afternoon by the third lieutenant, and in compliment to him called by me Mount Baker, rose a very conspicuous object ... apparently at a very remote distance.

Six years later, the official narrative of this voyage was published, including the first printed reference to the mountain. By the mid-1850s, Mount Baker was a well-known feature on the horizon to the explorers and fur traders who traveled in the Puget Sound region. Isaac I. Stevens, the first governor of Washington Territory, wrote about Mount Baker in 1853:

Mount Baker ... is one of the loftiest and most conspicuous peaks of the northern Cascade range; it is nearly as high as Mount Rainier, and like that mountain, its snow-covered pyramid has the form of a sugar-loaf. It is visible from all the water and islands ... [in Puget Sound] and from the whole southeastern part of the Gulf of Georgia, and likewise from the eastern division of the Strait of Juan de Fuca. It is for this region a natural and important landmark.

== Climbing history ==
=== First ascent ===
Edmund Thomas Coleman, an Englishman who resided in Victoria, British Columbia, Canada and a veteran of the Alps, made the first attempt to ascend the mountain in 1866. He chose a route via the Skagit River, but was forced to turn back when local Native Americans refused him passage.

Later that same year, Coleman recruited Whatcom County settlers Edward Eldridge, John Bennett, and John Tennant to aid him in his second attempt to scale the mountain. After approaching via the North Fork of the Nooksack River, the party navigated through what is now known as Coleman Glacier and ascended to within several hundred feet of the summit before turning back in the face of an "overhanging cornice of ice" and threatening weather. Coleman later returned to the mountain after two years. At 4:00 pm on August 17, 1868, Coleman, Eldridge, Tennant and two new companions (David Ogilvy and Thomas Stratton) scaled the summit via the Middle Fork Nooksack River, Marmot Ridge, Coleman Glacier, and the north margin of the Roman Wall.

=== Notable ascents ===
- 1948 North Ridge (AD, AI 2–3, 3700 feet) Fred Beckey, Ralph and Dick Widrig (August 1948)

== Geology ==
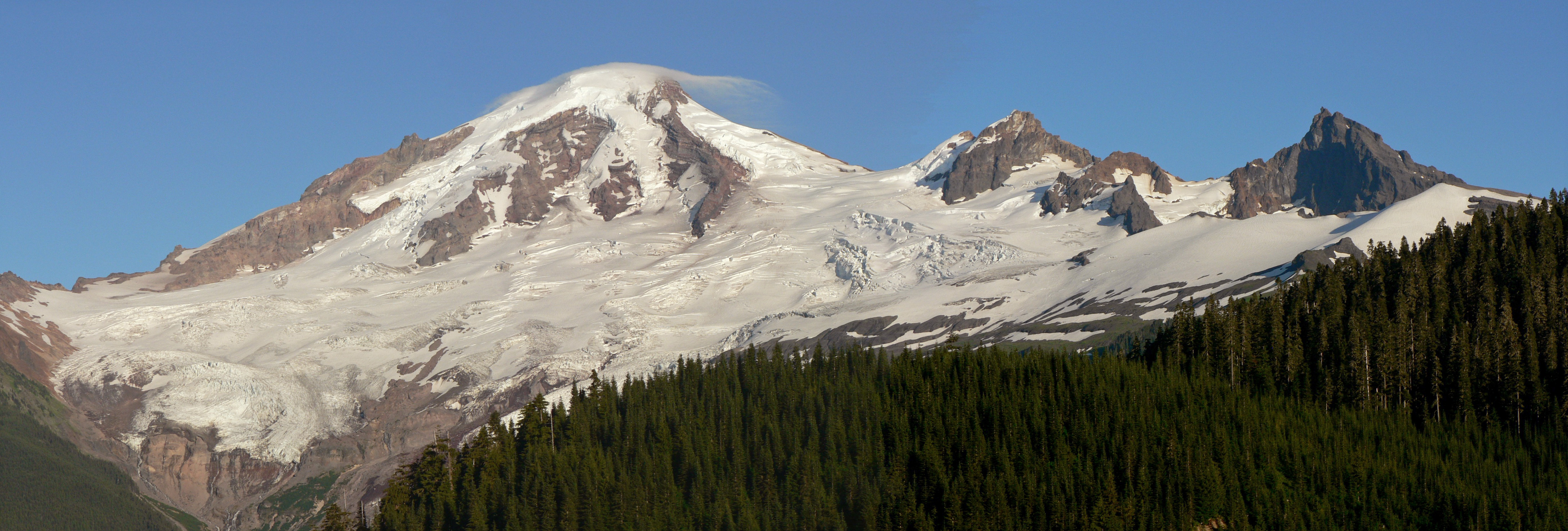
Panorama from the northwest showing Lincoln and Colfax peaks, the Black Buttes and Mount Baker

The present-day cone of Mount Baker is relatively young, perhaps less than 100,000 years old. The volcano sits atop a similar older volcanic cone called Black Buttes, which was active between 500,000 and 300,000 years ago.

Much of Mount Baker's earlier geological record eroded away during the last ice age (which culminated 15,000–20,000 years ago), by thick ice sheets that filled the valleys and surrounded the volcano. In the last 14,000 years, the area around the mountain has been largely ice-free, but the mountain itself remains heavily covered with snow and ice.

Isolated ridges of lava and hydrothermally altered rock, especially in the area of Sherman Crater, are exposed between glaciers on the upper flanks of the volcano; the lower flanks are steep and heavily vegetated. Volcanic rocks of Mount Baker and Black Buttes rest on a foundation of non-volcanic rocks.

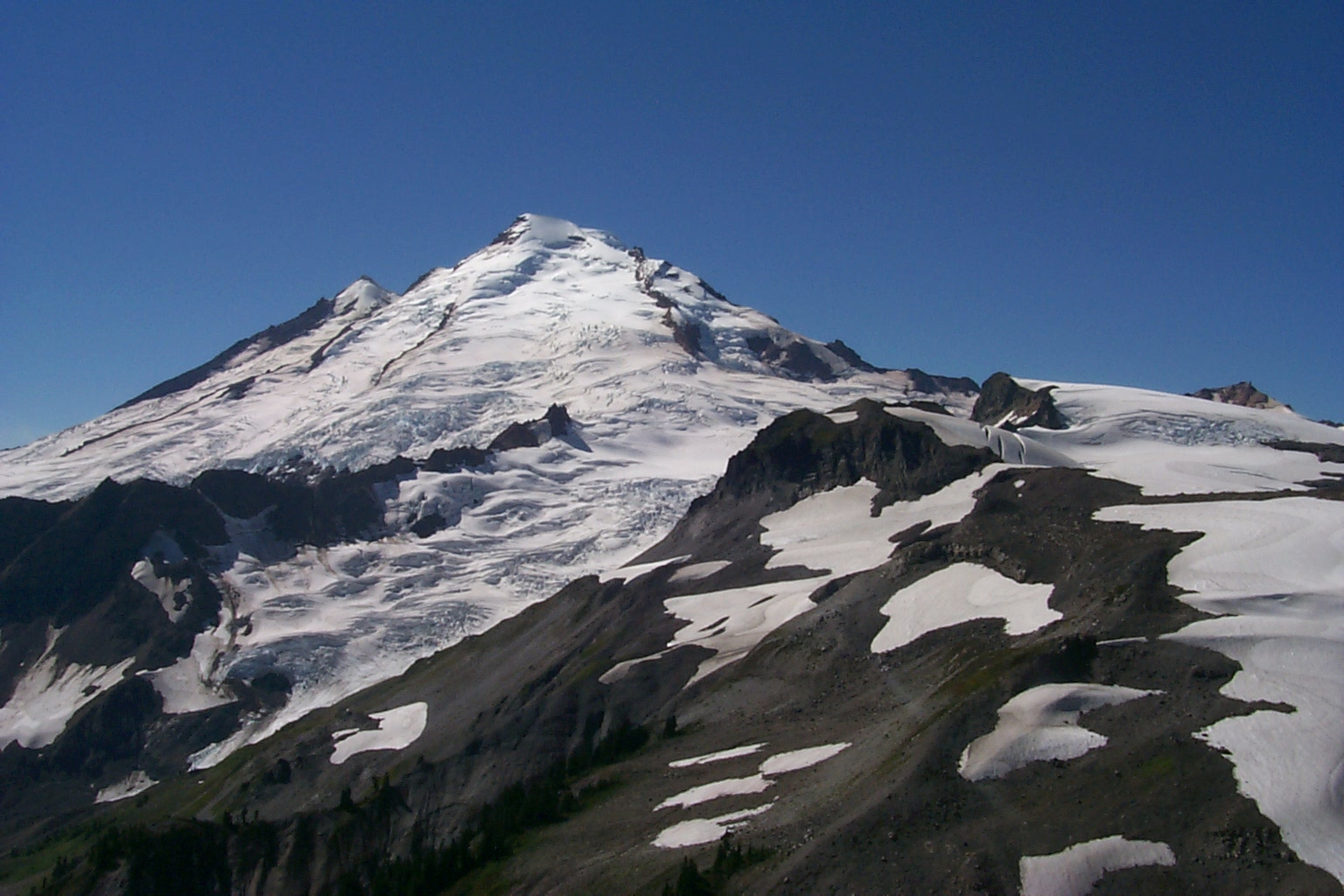
Park and Rainbow Glaciers on the northeast flank

Deposits recording the last 14,000 years at Mount Baker indicate that Mount Baker has not had highly explosive eruptions like those of other volcanoes in the Cascade Volcanic Arc, such as Mount St. Helens, Glacier Peak, or the Mount Meager massif, nor has it erupted frequently. During this period, four episodes of magmatic eruptive activity have been recently recognized.

Magmatic eruptions have produced tephra, pyroclastic flows, and lava flows from summit vents and the Schriebers Meadow Cone. The most destructive and most frequent events at Mount Baker have been lahars or debris flows and debris avalanches. Many, if not most, of these were not related to magmatic eruptions, but may have been induced by magma intrusion, steam eruptions, earthquakes, gravitational instability, or possibly even heavy rainfall.

=== Eruptive history ===
==== Early history ====
Research beginning in the late 1990s shows that Mount Baker is the youngest of several volcanic centers in the area and one of the youngest volcanoes in the Cascade Range. The Pliocene Hannegan caldera is preserved 16 mi (25 km) northeast of Mount Baker Volcanic activity in the Mount Baker volcanic field began more than one million years ago, but many of the earliest lava and tephra deposits have been removed by glacial erosion. The pale-colored rocks northeast of the modern volcano mark the site of the ancient (1.15 million years old) Kulshan caldera that collapsed after an enormous ash eruption one million years ago. Subsequently, eruptions in the Mount Baker area have produced cones and lava flows of andesite, the rock that constitutes much of the other Cascade Range volcanoes such as Rainier, Adams, and Hood. From about 900,000 years ago to the present, numerous andesitic volcanic centers in the area have come and disappeared through glacial erosion. The largest of these cones is the Black Buttes edifice, active between 500,000 and 300,000 years ago and formerly bigger than today's Mount Baker.

==== Modern craters and cone ====
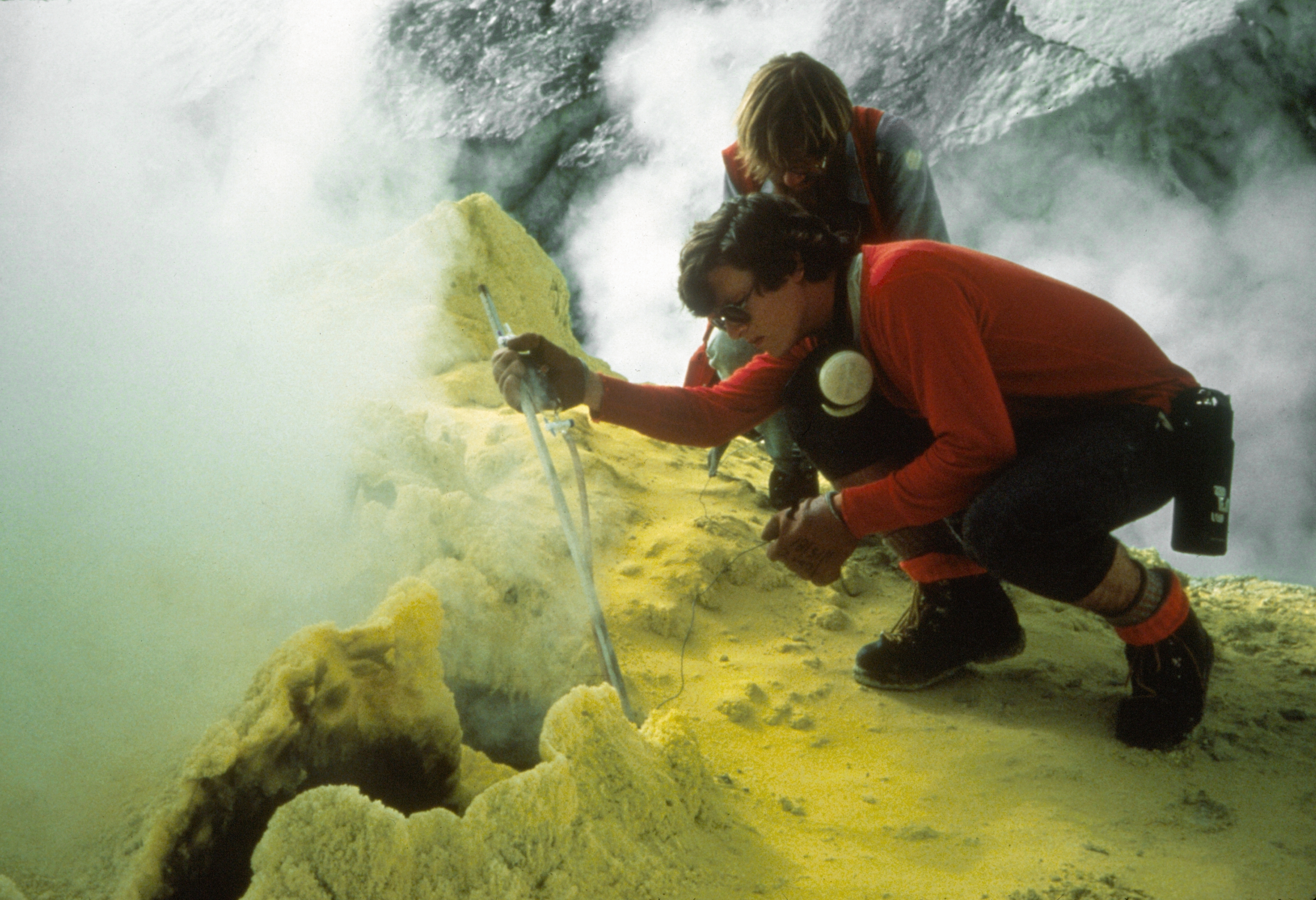
Sampling fumarole gas at Sherman Crater in 1981

Mount Baker was built from stacks of lava and volcanic breccia prior to the end of the last glacial period, which ended about 15,000 years ago. Two craters are on the mountain. Ice-filled Carmelo Crater is under the summit ice dome. This crater is the source for the last cone-building eruptions The highest point of Mount Baker, Grant Peak, is on the exposed southeast rim of Carmelo Crater, which is a small pile of andesitic scoria lying on top of a stack of lava flows just below. Carmelo Crater is deeply dissected on its south side by the younger Sherman Crater. This crater is south of the summit, and its ice-covered floor is 1,000 ft (300 m) below the summit ice dome. This crater is the site of all Holocene eruptive activity. Hundreds of fumaroles vent gases, primarily H_{2}O, CO_{2}, and H_{2}S.

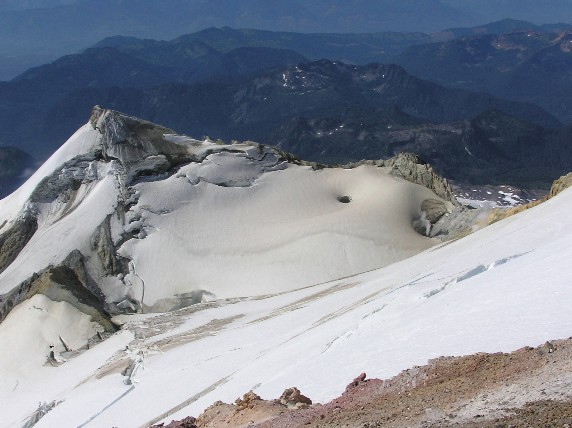
View south into Sherman Crater from Grant Peak, 10,781 ft (3,286 m) in 2004. Sherman Peak, 10,140 ft (3,090 m) at left; fumaroles of west rim at right.

Lava flows from the summit vent erupted between 30,000 and 10,000 years ago, and during the final stages of edifice construction, blocky pyroclastic flows entered the volcano's southeastern drainages. An eruption from Sherman Crater 6,600 years ago erupted a blanket of ash that extended more than 40 mi (64 km) to the east. Today, sulfurous gases reach the surface via two fumarole pathways: Dorr Fumarole, northeast of the summit, and Sherman Crater, south of the summit. Both are sites of hydrothermal alteration, converting lavas to weak, white-to-yellow clays; sulfur is a common mineral around these fumaroles. At Sherman Crater, collapses of this weakened rock generated lahars in the 1840s.

==== Mazama Park eruptive period: 6,600 years ago ====
Around 6,600 years ago, a series of discrete events culminated in the largest tephra-producing eruption in postglacial time at Mount Baker. This is the last episode of undoubted magmatic activity preserved in the geologic record. First, the largest collapse in the history of the volcano occurred from the Roman Wall and transformed into a lahar that was over 300 ft (91 m) deep in the upper reaches of the Middle Fork of the Nooksack River. It was at least 25 ft (7.6 m) deep 30 mi (48 km) downstream from the volcano. At that time, the Nooksack River is believed to have drained north into the Fraser River; this lahar is unlikely to have reached Bellingham Bay. Next, a small hydrovolcanic eruption occurred at Sherman Crater, triggering a second collapse of the flank just east of the Roman Wall. That collapse also became a lahar that mainly followed the course of the first lahar for at least 20 mi (32 km), and also spilled into tributaries of the Baker River. Finally, an eruption cloud deposited ash as far as 40 mi (64 km) downwind to the northeast and east.

==== Historical activity ====
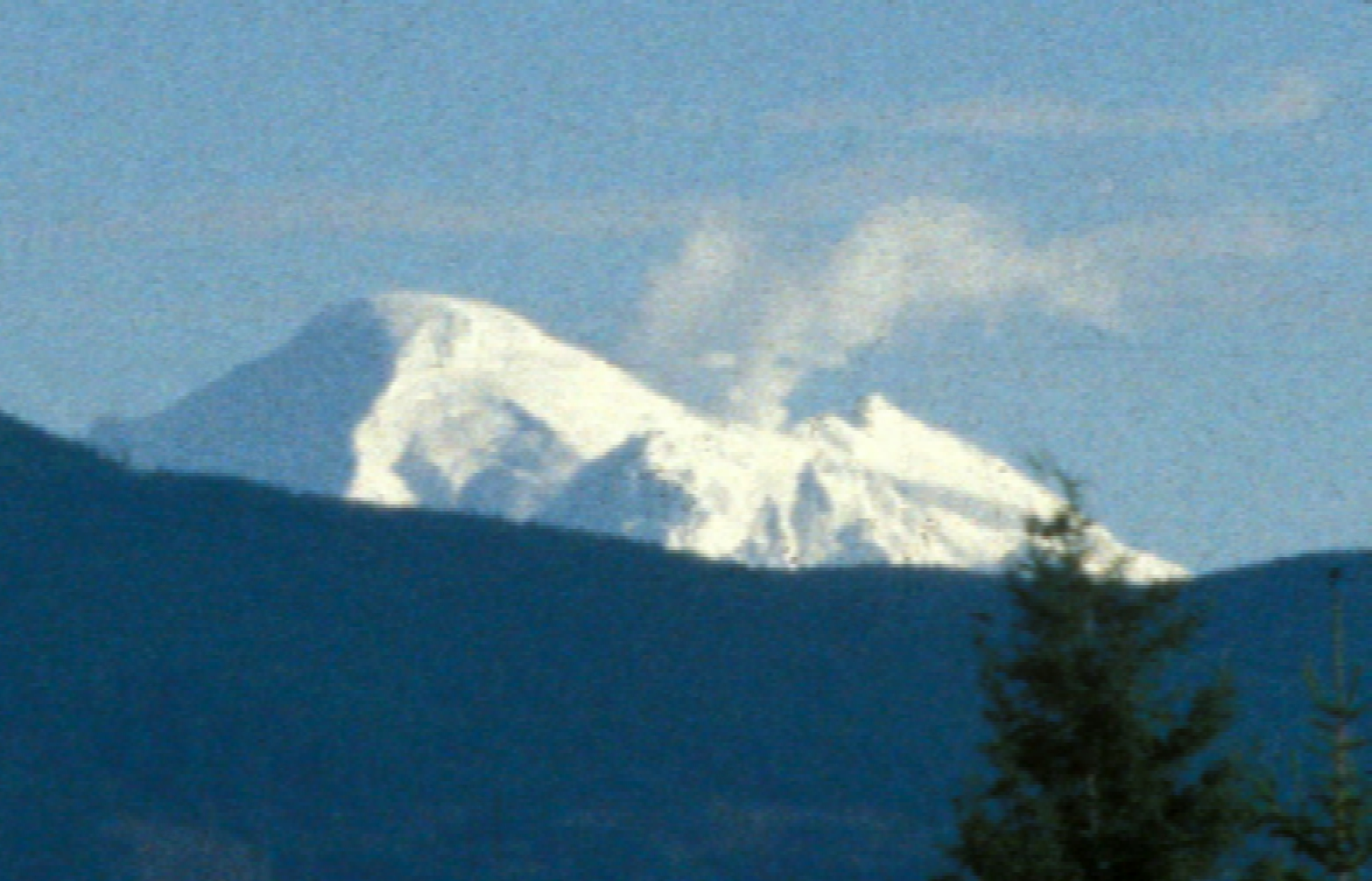
Steam plume rising from Sherman Crater, December 1999, telephoto taken from Bellingham, Washington

Several eruptions occurred from Sherman Crater during the 19th century; they were witnessed from the Bellingham area. A possible eruption was seen in June 1792 during the Spanish expedition of Dionisio Alcalá Galiano and Cayetano Valdés. Their report read, in part:

During the night [while anchored in Bellingham Bay] we constantly saw light to the south and east of the mountain of Carmelo [Baker] and even at times some bursts of flame, signs which left no doubt that there are volcanoes with strong eruptions in those mountains.

Most of Mount Baker's eruptions that have a confirmed VEI level had a VEI of 2 but two possible eruptions had a VEI of 3.

In 1843, explorers reported a widespread layer of newly fallen rock fragments "like a snowfall" and that the forest was "on fire for miles around". These fires were unlikely to have been caused by ashfall, however, as charred material is not found with deposits of this fine-grained volcanic ash, which was almost certainly cooled in the atmosphere before falling. Rivers south of the volcano were reportedly clogged with ash, and Native Americans reported that many salmon perished. Reports of flooding on the Skagit River from the eruption are, however, probably greatly exaggerated. A short time later, two collapses of the east side of Sherman Crater produced two lahars, the first and larger of which flowed into the natural Baker Lake, increasing its level by at least 10 ft (3.0 m). The location of the 19th-century lake is now covered by waters of the modern dam-impounded Baker Lake. Similar but lower-level hydrovolcanic activity at Sherman Crater continued intermittently for several decades afterward. On 26 November 1860, passengers who were traveling by steamer from New Westminster to Victoria reported that Mount Baker was "puffing out large volumes of smoke, which upon breaking, rolled down the snow-covered sides of the mountain, forming a pleasing effect of light and shade." In 1891, about 15 km^{3} (3.6 cu mi) of rock fell producing a lahar that traveled more than 6 mi (9.7 km) and covered 1 sq mi (2.6 km^{2}).

Activity in the 20th century decreased from the 19th century. Numerous small debris avalanches fell from Sherman Peak and descended the Boulder Glacier; a large one occurred on July 27, 2007.

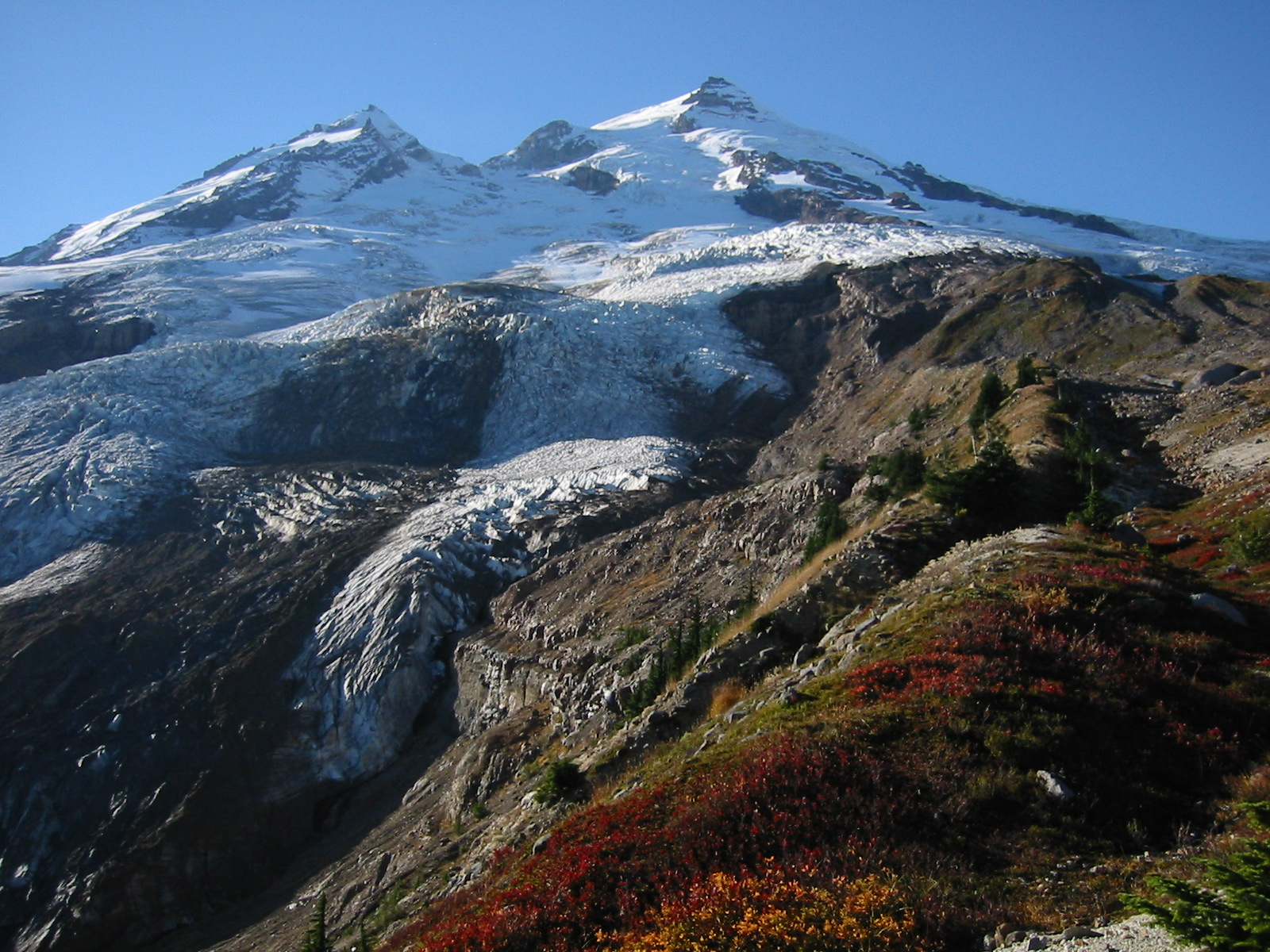
Mount Baker and Boulder Glacier as seen from the southeast

In early March 1975, a dramatic increase in fumarolic activity and snow melt in the Sherman Crater area raised concern that an eruption might be imminent. Heat flow increased more than tenfold. Additional monitoring equipment was installed and several geophysical surveys were conducted to try to detect the movement of magma. The increased thermal activity prompted public officials and Puget Power to temporarily close public access to the popular Baker Lake recreation area and to lower the reservoir's water level by 33 feet (10 m). If those actions had not been taken, significant avalanches of debris from the Sherman Crater area could have swept directly into the reservoir, triggering a disastrous wave that could have caused human fatalities and damage to the reservoir. Other than the increased heat flow, few anomalies were recorded during the geophysical surveys, nor were any other precursory activities observed that would indicate that magma was moving up into the volcano. Several small lahars formed from material ejected onto the surrounding glaciers and acidic water was discharged into Baker Lake for many months.

Activity gradually declined over the next two years, but stabilized at a higher level than before 1975. The increased level of fumarolic activity has continued at Mount Baker since 1975, but no other changes suggest that magma movement is involved.

==== Current research at Mount Baker ====
A considerable amount of research has been done at Mount Baker over the past decade, and it is now among the most-studied of the Cascade Volcanoes. Recent and ongoing projects include gravimetric and GPS-based geodetic monitoring, fumarole gas sampling, tephra distribution mapping, new interpretations of the Schriebers Meadow lava flow, and hazards analyses. Mapping of Carmelo and Sherman craters, and interpretations of the eruptive history, continue, as well. The Mount Baker Volcano Research Center maintains an online archive of abstracts of this work, and an extensive references list, as well as photos.

=== Climate ===
Mount Baker has an alpine tundra climate (ET)

Climate data for Mount Baker Summit. 1991-2020
Month	Jan	Feb	Mar	Apr	May	Jun	Jul	Aug	Sep	Oct	Nov	Dec	Year
Mean daily maximum °F (°C)	19.3 (−7.1)	18.6 (−7.4)	19.1 (−7.2)	23.2 (−4.9)	31.7 (−0.2)	37.7 (3.2)	47.2 (8.4)	47.8 (8.8)	43.1 (6.2)	33.2 (0.7)	22.2 (−5.4)	17.9 (−7.8)	30.1 (−1.1)
Daily mean °F (°C)	14.0 (−10.0)	12.0 (−11.1)	11.6 (−11.3)	14.6 (−9.7)	22.3 (−5.4)	27.7 (−2.4)	36.1 (2.3)	36.8 (2.7)	32.8 (0.4)	24.7 (−4.1)	16.4 (−8.7)	12.9 (−10.6)	21.8 (−5.7)
Mean daily minimum °F (°C)	8.7 (−12.9)	5.4 (−14.8)	4.0 (−15.6)	5.9 (−14.5)	12.8 (−10.7)	17.7 (−7.9)	24.9 (−3.9)	25.9 (−3.4)	22.5 (−5.3)	16.1 (−8.8)	10.6 (−11.9)	7.9 (−13.4)	13.5 (−10.3)
Average precipitation inches (mm)	27.87 (708)	19.78 (502)	23.14 (588)	13.60 (345)	9.00 (229)	7.18 (182)	3.65 (93)	4.44 (113)	10.92 (277)	21.20 (538)	32.47 (825)	28.04 (712)	201.28 (5,113)
Average dew point °F (°C)	5.1 (−14.9)	2.4 (−16.4)	1.0 (−17.2)	1.6 (−16.9)	8.1 (−13.3)	13.4 (−10.3)	18.8 (−7.3)	19.1 (−7.2)	16.2 (−8.8)	11.6 (−11.3)	7.5 (−13.6)	5.2 (−14.9)	9.2 (−12.7)
Source: PRISM Climate Group

=== Glaciers and hydrology ===
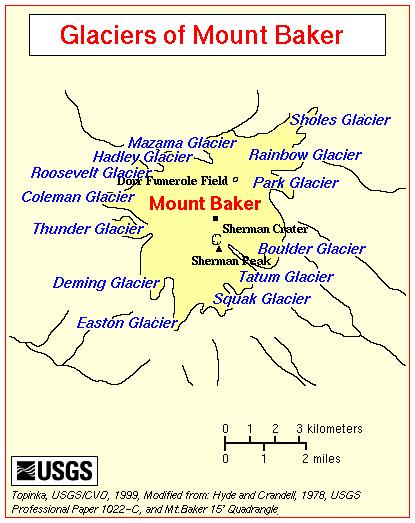
A map of the glaciers on Mount Baker

Eleven named glaciers descend from Mount Baker. Two additional glaciers (Hadley Glacier and Sholes Glacier) descend from lower slopes detached from the main glacial mass. The Coleman Glacier is the largest; it has a surface area of 1,285 acres (5.2 km^{2}). The other large glaciers—which have areas greater than 625 acres (2.5 km^{2})—are Roosevelt Glacier, Mazama Glacier, Park Glacier, Boulder Glacier, Easton Glacier, and Deming Glacier. All retreated during the first half of the century, advanced from 1950 to 1975 and have been retreating with increasing rapidity since 1980. It is estimated that Baker's glaciers will disappear around 2055 or 2075 due to global warming.

Mount Baker is drained on the north by streams that flow into the North Fork Nooksack River, on the west by the Middle Fork Nooksack River, and on the southeast and east by tributaries of the Baker River. Lake Shannon and Baker Lake are the largest nearby bodies of water, formed by two dams on the Baker River.

== U.S. Navy ==
Two ammunition ships of the United States Navy (traditionally named for volcanoes) have been named after the mountain. The first was USS Mount Baker (AE-4), which was commissioned from 1941 to 1947 and from 1951 to 1969. In 1972, the Navy commissioned USS Mount Baker (AE-34). She was decommissioned in 1996 and placed in service with the Military Sealift Command as USNS Mount Baker (T-AE-34). She was scrapped in 2012.
