= Schriebers Meadow Cone =

Parasitic cone in Whatcom County, Washington

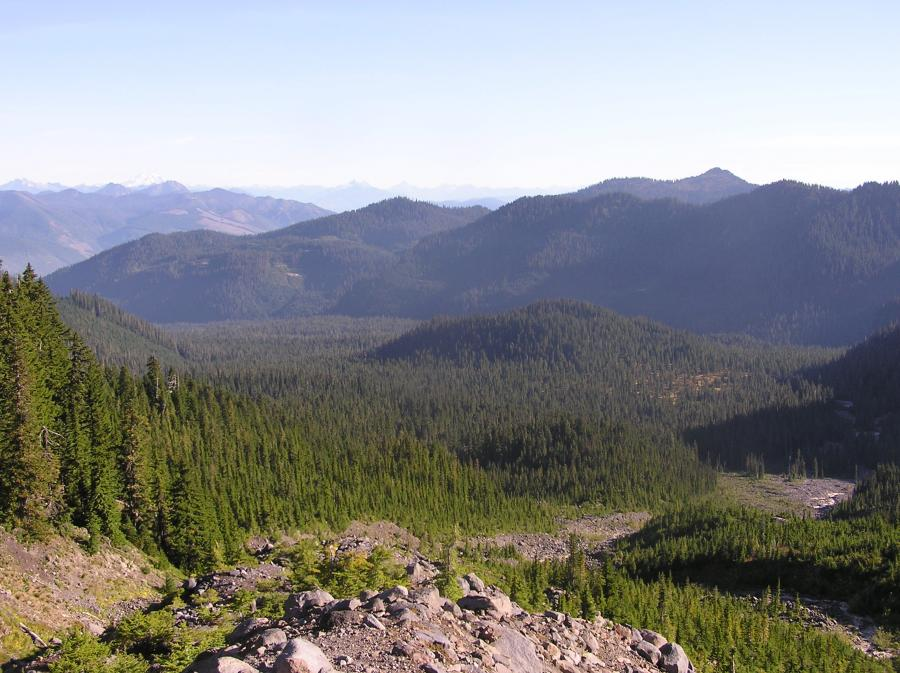
- Schriebers Meadow Cone is the tree covered mound in center

Highest point
- Elevation: 3,640 ft (1,110 m)
- Coordinates: 48°41′57″N 121°49′2″W

Geography
- Location within Washington (state)
- Location: Whatcom County, Washington, U.S.
- Parent range: Cascade Range
- Topo map: USGS Mount Baker

Geology
- Mountain type: Cinder cone

Schriebers Meadow Cone is a small parasitic cone on the southeastern flank of Mount Baker in the U.S. state of Washington. It was formed about 9,800 years ago by the only known Holocene flank eruption of Mount Baker. A basaltic lava flow traveled down the Sulphur Creek valley and across the Baker River valley; this is the most recent lava flow at Mount Baker. Future eruptions from Schriebers Meadow Cone are unlikely to occur as it is considered a short-lived feature.

Schriebers Meadow Cone produced thick dark-reddish-brown to yellowish-red scoria that blankets the sides of the Sulphur Creek valley near and southeast of Schriebers Meadow. Near Schriebers Meadow the scoria deposit is thickest on the north valley wall and it decreases in grain size and thickness within short distances. Within 0.62 mi (1.00 km) of the cone the scoria fragments are as much as 9.8 in (25 cm) in diameter and the deposit is 20 to 39 in (51 to 99 cm) thick; 3.7 mi (6.0 km) to the northeast the fragments are of sand size and the deposit is no more than 1.2 in (3.0 cm) thick.
