= Sholes Glacier =

Glacier in Washington, United States

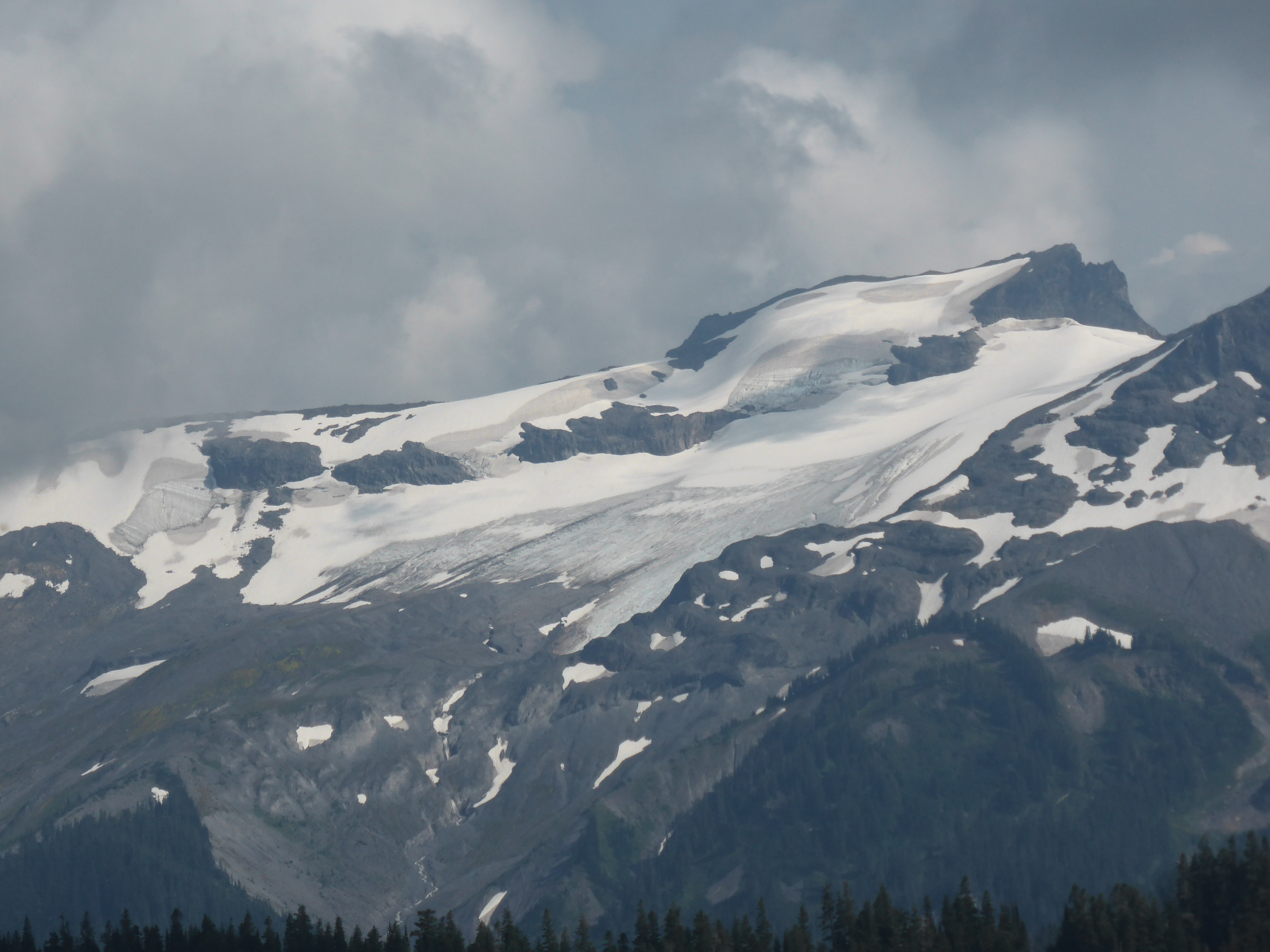

- Location within Washington (state)
- Type: Mountain glacier
- Location: Whatcom County, Washington, USA
- Coordinates: 48°48′46″N 121°46′22″W
- Length: .65 mi (1.05 km)
- Terminus: Moraine/talus
- Status: Retreating

Sholes Glacier is located on the northeast slopes of Mount Baker in the North Cascades of the U.S. state of Washington. The glacier lies on the north side of the ridge known as The Portals. Between 1850 and 1950, Sholes Glacier retreated 3,838 ft (1,170 m). During a cooler and wetter period from 1950 to 1979, the glacier advanced 187 ft (57 m) but between 1980 and 2006 retreated back 278 ft (85 m).

Sholes Glacier is named in honor of Charles H. Sholes, who served as president of the Mazamas in the early 1900s.

== See also ==
- List of glaciers in the United States
