= Hadley Glacier =

Glacier in Washington, United States

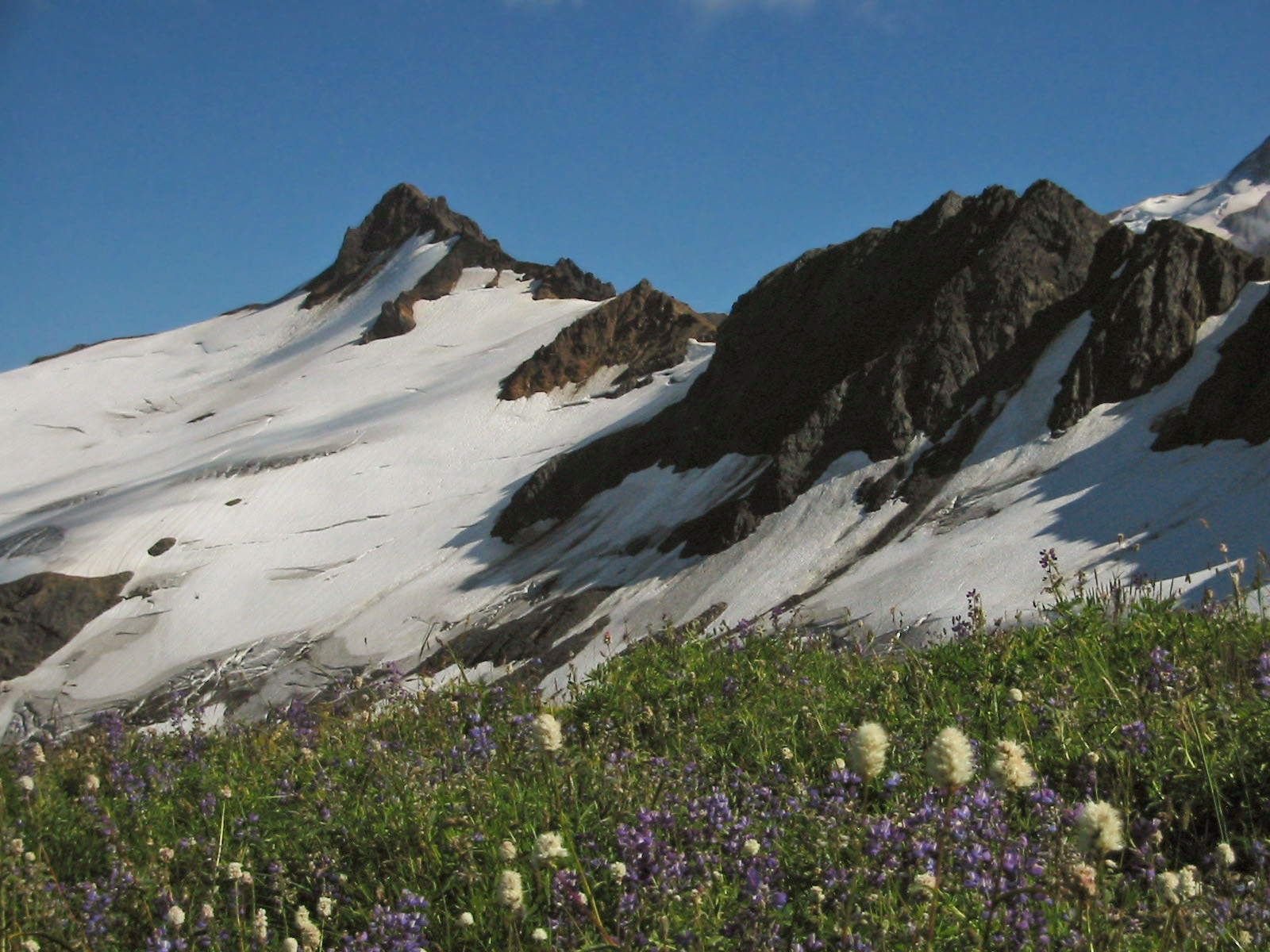
- Hadley Glacier (left) on the north slope of Hadley Peak

- Location within Washington (state)
- Type: Mountain glacier
- Location: Whatcom County, Washington, United States
- Coordinates: 48°49′12″N 121°49′34″W
- Length: .40 mi (0.64 km)
- Terminus: Moraine/talus
- Status: Retreating

Hadley Glacier is located on Mount Baker in the North Cascades of the U.S. state of Washington. Situated on the north slopes of Mount Baker, Hadley Glacier is north of Hadley Peak on a spur from Mount Baker.

== See also ==
- List of glaciers in the United States
