= Rainbow Glacier (Washington) =

Glacier in Washington, United States

- Location within Washington (state)
- Type: Mountain glacier
- Location: Whatcom County, Washington, USA
- Coordinates: 48°47′51″N 121°46′32″W
- Length: 2.5 mi (4.0 km)
- Terminus: Icefall/cliffs/talus
- Status: Retreating

Rainbow Glacier is located on the northeast slopes of Mount Baker in the North Cascades of the U.S. state of Washington. Rainbow Glacier descends to nearly 4,500 ft (1,400 m) to the north of Lava Divide. In the middle of its course, Rainbow Glacier is connected to Park Glacier to its south and Mazama Glacier to the west. Between 1850 and 1950, Rainbow Glacier retreated 4,494 ft (1,370 m). During a cooler and wetter period from 1950 to 1979, the glacier advanced 1,679 ft (512 m) but between 1980 and 2006 retreated back 1,345 ft (410 m).

== See also ==
- List of glaciers in the United States
