= Joseph Baker (Royal Navy officer) =

British naval officer

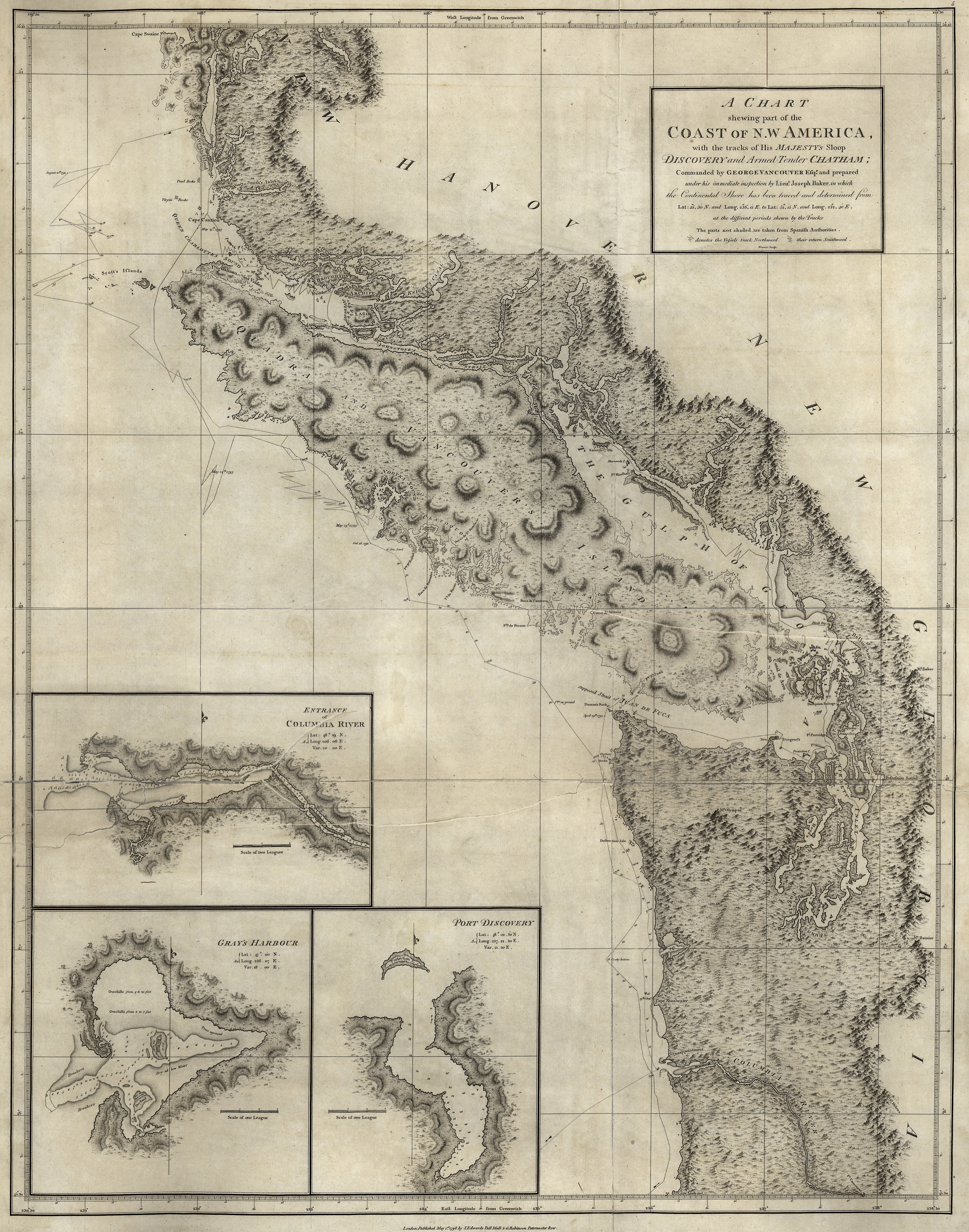
Map of the Pacific Northwest Coast of America made by Joseph Baker with his name sake Mount Baker depicted on the middle right.

Joseph Baker (1767–1817) was an officer in the Royal Navy, best known for his role in the mapping of the Pacific Northwest Coast of America during the Vancouver Expedition of 1791–1795. Mount Baker is named after him.

== Voyaging with Vancouver ==
Baker is thought to have come from the Welsh border counties. From 1787 he served on HMS Europa where he met then-Lieutenant George Vancouver and then-Midshipman Peter Puget. Vancouver picked Baker as 3rd Lieutenant (and Puget as 2nd Lieutenant) of HMS Discovery for a round-the-world survey, focusing on the American Pacific Northwest Coast. Baker proved a highly capable surveyor and chartmaker in addition to his other duties.

The voyage started with complications. Discovery put in at Tenerife where Baker was seriously beaten trying to put down a sailor's brawl. The voyage proceeded more smoothly to Cape Town, the south coast of Australia and New Zealand. In Tahiti and Hawaii, then called the Sandwich Islands, he accompanied Archibald Menzies in botanical explorations.

Most of the small-boat work in exploring the Northwest Coast of America was done by the more senior officers, while Baker specialized in converting their observations into nautical charts. When Discovery explored Admiralty Inlet, Baker was the first Briton to see Mount Baker, a prominent volcano which Vancouver named after him, although it had already been sketched by the Spaniard Gonzalo López de Haro in 1790 as first pilot on Manuel Quimper's exploration of the area.

In 1794, while Discovery wintered in Hawai'i, Baker accompanying Menzies, Midshipman George McKenzie and another man whose name is not recorded, on the first recorded ascent of Mauna Loa. Lacking any particular equipment for snow or altitude, they summitted at 13,681 feet (4170m) and took careful observation to accurately measure the height within a few dozen feet.

Baker frequently commanded Discovery when the other officers were away. After Vancouver departed the ship in Shannon, Baker brought her safely home to Long Reach on the Thames, completing her five-year mission on 20 October 1795.

Baker spent much of the next few years refining the expedition's charts for publication. After the Peace of Amiens caused the Admiralty to reduce the Navy, he lived at his family home in Presteigne.

== Baltic service ==
Baker was recalled to service and, in 1808, made post captain. On 3 November 1808, he was captain of Tartar, which was escorting a convoy off the Naze of Norway. She sighted a sloop and gave chase. After a chase of three hours, Tartar captured the sloop, which turned out to be the Danish privateer Naargske Gutten, of seven 6 and 4-pounders and 36 men. She was quite new and only one day out from Christiansand.

On 15 May 1809, Baker and Tartar chased a Danish privateer sloop on shore near Felixberg on the coast of Courland. She was armed with two 12-pounders and two long 4-pounders and carried a crew of 24. These, armed with muskets, took up positions behind the sandhills where some local civilians joined them. Baker sent in his boats. The British cutting out party boarded her, without loss, and turned the privateer's guns on the beach. One of the prize crew was lucky to discover a lighted candle set in a powder cartridge in the magazine and extinguished it when it had only a half an inch to burn. The magazine contained about a hundredweight of powder; had it exploded it would have killed the boarding party. Baker considered this artifice a dishonourable mode of warfare. The prize crew brought the sloop off.

At the beginning of March 1811 Vice Admiral Sir James Saumarez received information that the Danes would attack the island of Anholt, on which there was a garrison of British forces under Capt. Maurice of the Royal Navy. Tartar sailed from Yarmouth on the 20th and anchored off the north end of the island on the 26th. On 27 March the garrison sighted the enemy off the south side of the island. Maurice marched to meet them with a battery of howitzers and 200 infantry, and signaled Tartar and Sheldrake. The two vessels immediately weighed and, under a heavy press of sail made every endeavour to beat south but the shoals forced them to stand so far out that it took them many hours.

The Danes, who had eighteen heavy gunboats for support, landed some 1000 troops in the darkness and fog and attempted to outflank the British positions. Their attack was uncoordinated and poorly equipped. However the batteries at Fort Yorke (the British base) and Massareenes stopped the assault. Gunfire from Tartar and Sheldrake forced the gunboats to move off westwards. The gunboats made their escape over the reefs while the ships had to beat round the outside. Tartar chased three gunboats towards Læsø but found herself in shoal water as night approached and gave up the chase. On the way back Tartar captured two Danish transports that it had passed while chasing the gunboats; one of them had 22 soldiers on board, with a considerable quantity of ammunition, shells and the like, while the other contained provisions.

Sheldrake managed to capture two gunboats. The Danes on the western side managed to embark on board fourteen gunboats and make their escape. The Battle of Anholt cost the British only two killed and 30 wounded. The Danes lost their commander, three other officers, and 50 men killed. The British took, besides the wounded, five captains, nine lieutenants, and 504 rank and file as prisoners, as well as three pieces of artillery, 500 muskets, and 6,000 rounds of ammunition. In addition, Sheldrake's two captured gunboats resulted in another two Lieutenants of the Danish Navy, and 119 men falling prisoner.

Tartar grounded on 18 August 1811 on Dagö Island off the coast of Estonia and sprang a leak. Her crew refloated but she continued to fill with water. She was run ashore on 21 August at "Kahar Islet", midway between Dagö Island and the Isle of Worms (possibly Kassari Island), and later burnt. Ethalion rescued all her crew, who then were reassigned to other ships on the Baltic station. A court martial on 23 October honorably acquitted Captain Baker, his officers and crew.

== Later life ==
Though the court martial acquitted Baker, he never again served at sea. He returned to Presteigne and remained good friends with Puget, who moved nearby upon his own retirement.
