= Archibald Menzies =

Scottish surgeon, botanist and naturalist (1754–1842)

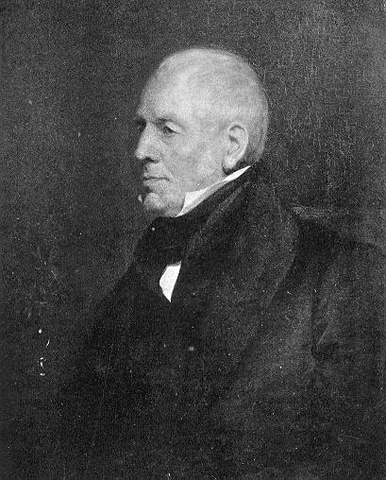
- Menzies by Eden Upton Eddis (c. 1835)
- Born: 16 March 1754; Weem, Perthshire, Scotland
- Died: 15 February 1842 (aged 87); London
- Education: Edinburgh University, University of Aberdeen (MD 1799)
- Known for: Introducing the monkey puzzle tree (Araucaria araucana) to England
- Scientific career
- Fields: Surgeon, botanist, lichenologist, naturalist
- Workplaces: Royal Botanic Garden Edinburgh, Royal Navy
- Author abbrev. (botany): Menzies

Archibald Menzies (/ˈmɪŋɪs/ MING-iss; 15 March 1754 – 15 February 1842) was a Scottish surgeon, botanist and naturalist. He spent many years at sea, serving with the Royal Navy, private merchants, and the Vancouver Expedition.

During his naval expeditions, he assembled the most extensive collection of extra-European lichen specimens of the 18th century, significantly contributing to the field of lichenology. He was the first recorded European to reach the summit of the Hawaiian volcano Mauna Loa and introduced the monkey puzzle tree (Chile pine) to England.

== Life and career ==
Menzies was born at Easter Stix (or Styx) in the parish of Weem, in Perthshire, Scotland. While working with his elder brother William at the Royal Botanic Gardens, he drew the attention of Dr John Hope, professor of botany at Edinburgh University, who encouraged him to study medicine there. Having qualified as a surgeon, Menzies served as assistant to a doctor in Caernarvon, Wales, then joined the Royal Navy as assistant surgeon on HMS Nonsuch. Present at Battle of the Saintes (12 April 1782), in peacetime Menzies served on Halifax Station in Nova Scotia.

In 1786 Menzies was appointed surgeon on board the Prince of Wales (Captain James Colnett), on a fur-trading voyage round Cape Horn to the northern Pacific. This ship, in company of Princess Royal (Captain Duncan), visited North America, China, and Hawaii (the Sandwich Isles) several times; Menzies collected a number of new plants on this voyage, and also ensured that none of the crew died of illness. Menzies returned to Great Britain in 1789. He was elected a fellow of the Linnean Society in 1790.

From 1791 until 1795, Menzies was appointed as naturalist to accompany Captain George Vancouver on his voyage around the world on HMS Discovery. When the surgeon fell ill, Menzies took over his duties. He collected many specimens of plants and animals during the voyage, returning them to the UK. He also made a detailed record of the voyage.

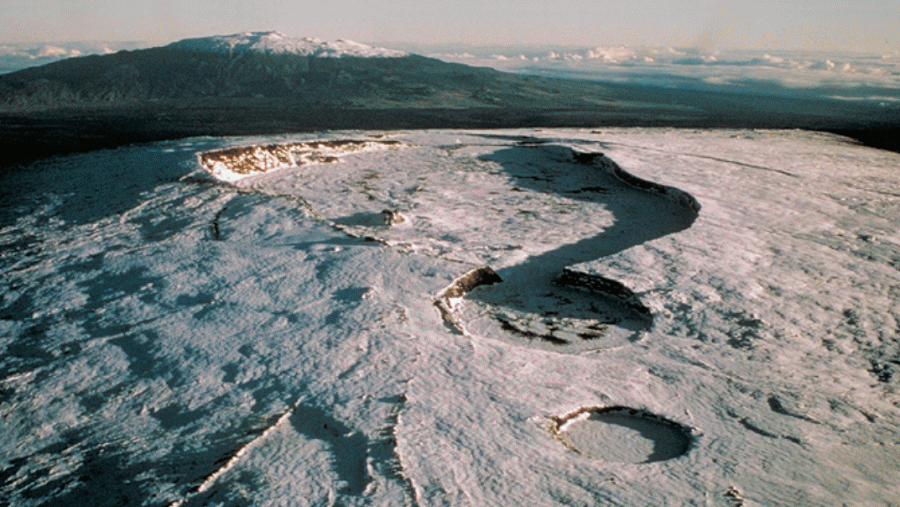
The remote summit of Mokuaweoweo

In 1794, while Discovery spent one of three winters in Hawaii, Menzies, with Lieutenant Joseph Baker and two other men, made the first recorded ascent to Mokuaweoweo, the summit of Mauna Loa. Menzies used a portable barometer to measure the height of the mountain as 13,564 feet (4,134 m) compared to its currently known height of 13,679 feet (4,169 m).

It would be forty years before another European, fellow Scotsman David Douglas, would reach the summit on 29 January 1834.

In 1795, Menzies was served the seeds of the Chile pine, Araucaria araucana, as a dessert while dining with the Viceroy of Chile. He was able to pop some seeds into his pocket and grow them onboard ship on the way back to Europe, and returned to England with five healthy plants, the first seen in Britain. Known as the monkey puzzle tree, the Chile pine became a favourite in most formal gardens of the nineteenth century.

After the voyage, Menzies served with the Navy in the West Indies. He received the degree of M.D. at the University of Aberdeen in 1799. After retiring from the Navy he became a doctor and surgeon at Notting Hill, London. He became the father of the Linnean Society upon the death of Aylmer Bourke Lambert.

Menzies's wife died in 1836. They had no children. Menzies himself died in London on 15 February 1842 and is buried in Kensal Green cemetery.

== Legacy ==
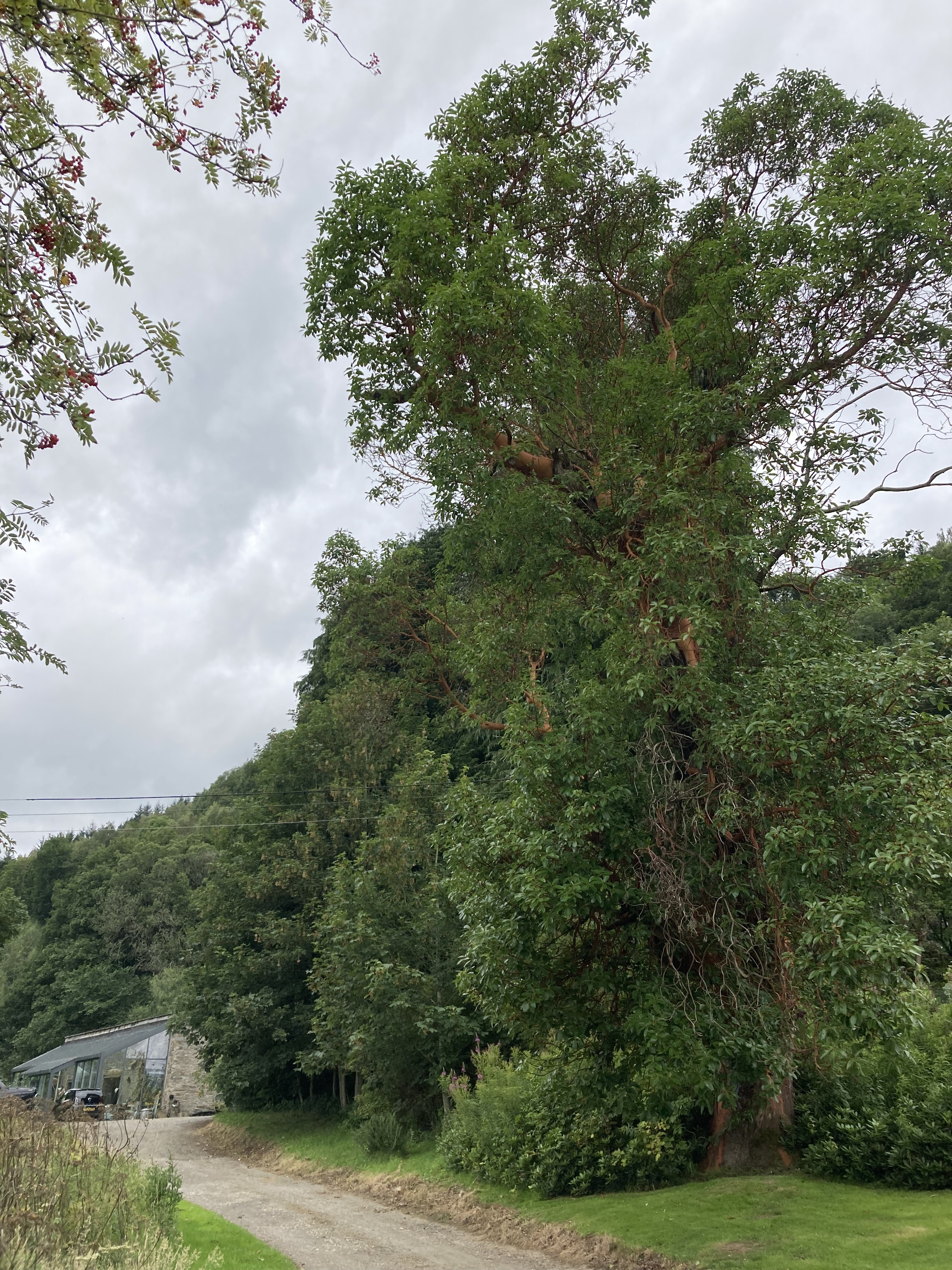
The Arbutus menziesii near Castle Menzies, Aberfeldy

Menzies's name is commemorated in the scientific names of several of the plants he discovered, including Menziesia, a genus of shrubs in the Ericaceae, and the Douglas fir Pseudotsuga menziesii, the most commercially important tree in western North America. The Pacific madrone, an evergreen tree and largest of the Ericaceae, was named Arbutus menziesii in his honour by Friedrich Pursh. Similarly, John Edward Gray named the most common species of freshwater mussel in New Zealand, Echyridella menziesii, after Menzies.

Also named for Menzies, in a corrupted form as adapted by the Nuxalk people of the Bella Coola area of the Central Coast of British Columbia, is "Bensins Island", as recorded by Alexander Mackenzie during his visit there shortly after Vancouver's ship visited the area.

The Ainapo Trail he used to climb Mauna Loa is also known as "Menzies Trail". One of the principal streets surrounding the Legislative Assembly of British Columbia in Victoria, British Columbia is named Menzies Street. There is also a main logging road on Vancouver Island known as Menzies Main.

Many of the specimens collected by Menzies are planted in London's Kew Gardens. He also brought back to London 112 separate collections of artefacts, which are housed at the British Museum. A comprehensive catalogue of these collections was not published until 1951.

=== Lichenological contributions ===
Menzies made significant contributions to the field of lichenology through his extensive collections of lichens during his naval career. Between 1784 and 1802, he amassed the most comprehensive collection of extra-European lichen taxa of the 18th century. His specimens came from diverse locations, including Nova Scotia, Staten Island, the west coast of North America, Sumatra, the Cape of Good Hope, New Zealand, Tahiti, Hawaii, and Saint Helena. Many of these collections represented first discoveries and type specimens, with 17 of the 194 species he collected being types.

The importance of Menzies's lichen collections was not fully recognised until long after his death. His specimens were distributed to various contemporary botanists and are now housed in several major herbaria, including the Royal Botanic Garden Edinburgh, the Linnean Society of London, and the Natural History Museum, London. Menzies's work laid the foundation for future studies in lichen biodiversity, particularly in North America and the Southern Hemisphere. His collections were studied by prominent lichenologists of the time, including Erik Acharius, who, in his 1803 work Methodus qua omnes detectos lichenes, formally described 15 new species based on Menzies's specimens.

== See also ==
- European and American voyages of scientific exploration
