= Mazama Glacier (Mount Baker) =

Glacier in Washington, United States

- Location within Washington (state)
- Type: Mountain glacier
- Location: Whatcom County, Washington, USA
- Coordinates: 48°48′13″N 121°48′04″W
- Length: 1.5 mi (2.4 km)
- Terminus: Moraine/talus
- Status: Retreating

Mazama Glacier is located on Mount Baker in the North Cascades of the U.S. state of Washington. Between 1850 and 1950, Mazama Glacier retreated 7,700 ft (2,300 m). During a cooler and wetter period from 1950 to 1979, the glacier advanced 1,476 ft (450 m) but between 1980 and 2006 retreated back 1,509 ft (460 m). Situated on the north slopes of Mount Baker, Mazama Glacier is bordered by the Park Glacier to the south and Rainbow Glacier to the east.

Mazama Glacier was named for the Mazamas, a mountaineering organization based in Portland, Oregon.

== See also ==
- List of glaciers in the United States
