= HMS Discovery (1789) =

Royal Navy survey ship best known for George Vancouver's expeditions

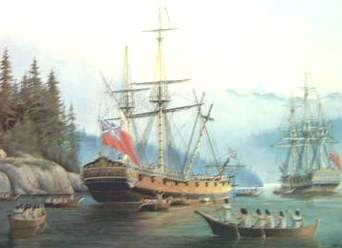
- Discovery

History

Great Britain
- Name: HMS Discovery
- Builder: Randall, Gray & Brent, Rotherhithe
- Launched: 1789
- Acquired: November 1789
- In service: 7 December 1789
- Reclassified: Bomb vessel in 1799; Convict hulk between 1808 and 1812; Army hospital ship between 1812 and 1815; Prison hulk between 1820 and 1834
- Honours and awards: Copenhagen 1801
- Fate: Broken up by 15 February 1834

General characteristics
- Class & type: 10-gun survey ship
- Tons burthen: 33065/98 bm
- Length: 99 ft 2 in (30.2 m) (overall); 77 ft 8 in (23.7 m) (keel)
- Beam: 28 ft 3 1/4 in (8.6 m)
- Depth of hold: 12 ft 4 in (3.8 m)
- Sail plan: Full-rigged ship
- Complement: Sloop-of-war: 94–100; As a bomb vessel, 67
- Armament: Sloop-of-war: 10 × 4-pounder guns (short)+ 10 × 1/2-pounder swivel guns; Bomb vessel: 1 × 13" mortar + 1 × 10" mortar + 8 × 24-pounder carronades + 2 × 6-pounder guns

HMS Discovery was a Royal Navy ship launched in 1789 and best known as the lead ship in George Vancouver's exploration of the west coast of North America in his famous 1791-1795 expedition. She was converted to a bomb vessel in 1798 and participated in the Battle of Copenhagen. Thereafter she served as a hospital ship and later as a prison hulk until 1831. She was broken up in 1834.

== Early years ==
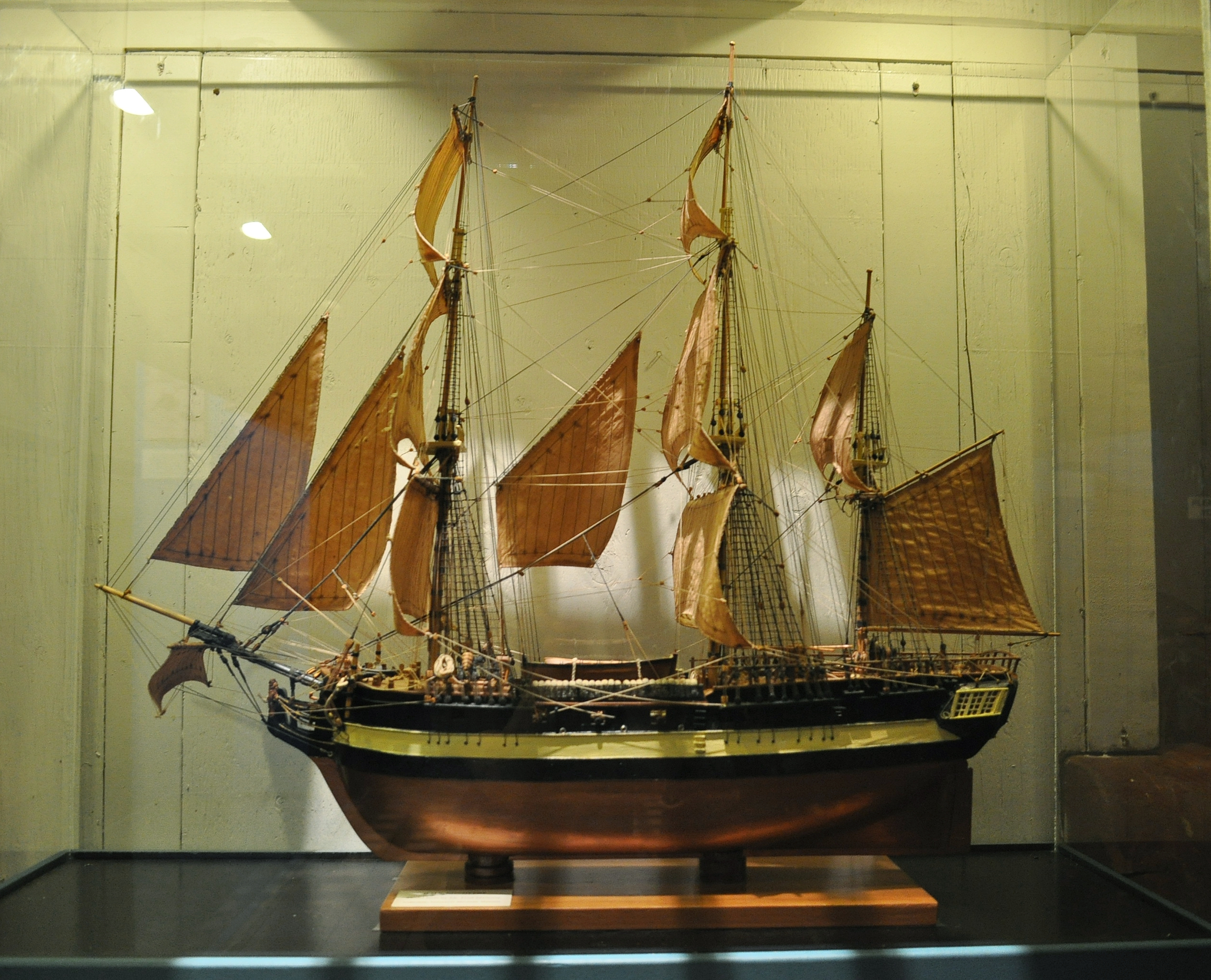
Model at the Vancouver Maritime Museum

Discovery was launched in 1789 and purchased for the Navy in 1790. She was named after the previous HMS Discovery, one of the ships on James Cook's third voyage to the Pacific Ocean. The earlier Discovery was the ship on which Vancouver had served as a teenage midshipman, he was now in his thirties having worked his way up the ranks.

Discovery was a full-rigged ship with a standard crew complement of 100 including a widow's man. She had been designed and built for a voyage of exploration to the Southern whale fisheries.

Discovery's first captain was Henry Roberts, with Vancouver as his first lieutenant. But when the Nootka Crisis began in 1789, Roberts and Vancouver were posted elsewhere. The ship then became a depot (hulk) for processing sailors brought in by press gangs in Chatham. Vancouver then returned and was given full command of Discovery to assist with the Nootka Sound Conventions.

== Voyages of discovery ==
=== Southern hemisphere ===
On 1 April 1791, Discovery left England with HMS Chatham. Both ships stopped at Cape Town before exploring the south coast of Australia. In King George Sound, the Discovery's naturalist and surgeon Archibald Menzies collected various plant species including Banksia grandis. This was the first recording of the genus Banksia from Western Australia. The two ships sailed to Hawaii where Vancouver met Kamehameha I. Chatham and Discovery then sailed on to the Northwest Pacific.

=== Pacific Northwest ===
Over the course of the next four years, Vancouver surveyed the northern Pacific Ocean coast in Discovery wintering in Spanish California or Hawaii. Vancouver named many features for his officers, friends, associates, and his ship Discovery.

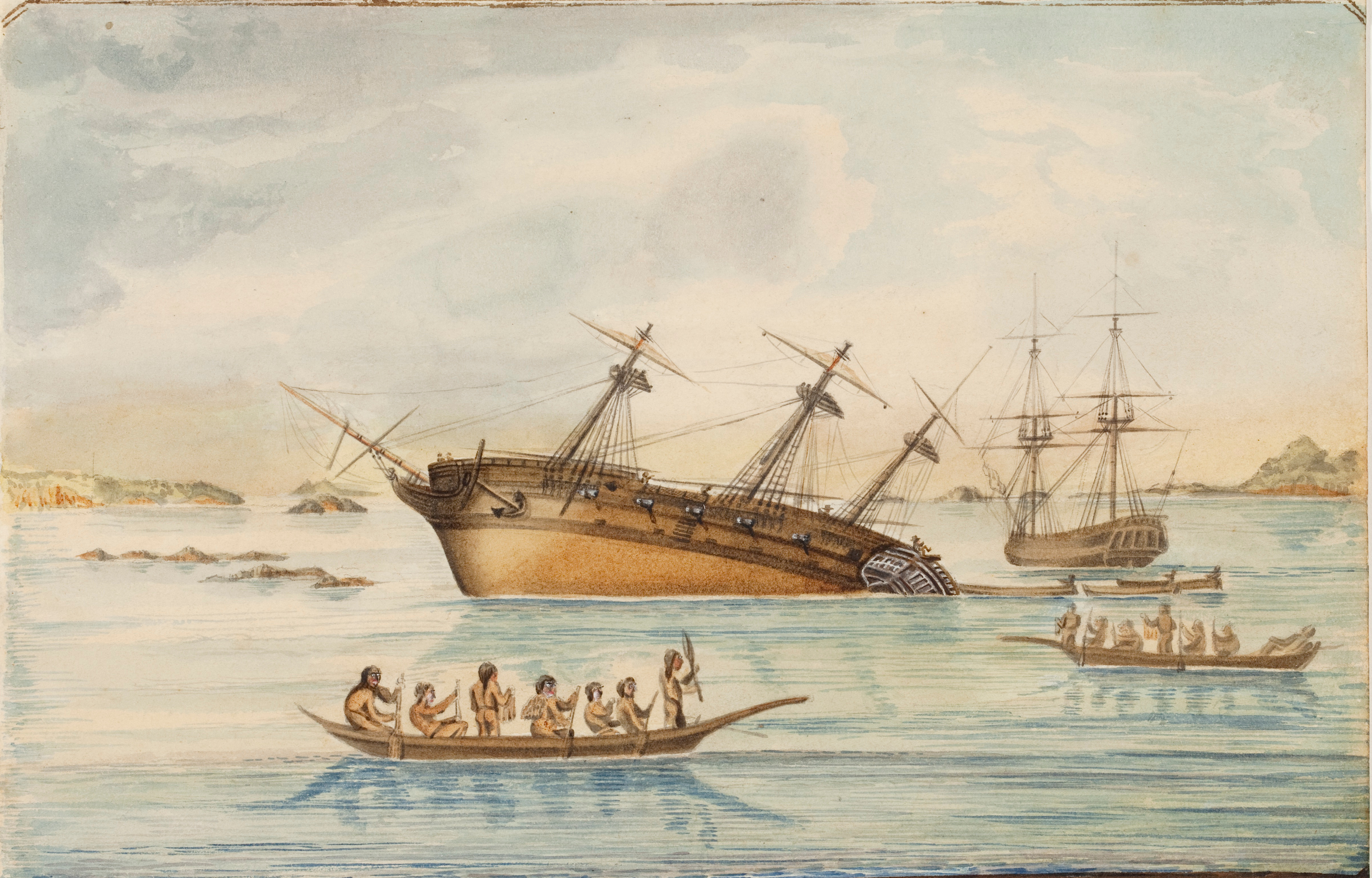
Discovery ran aground in early August 1792 on hidden rocks in Queen Charlotte Strait near Fife Sound. Within a day Chatham also ran aground on rocks about two miles away.

In 1793, Discovery entered a bay on the northern end of the Prince of Wales Island when a storm arose. Its shelter led to it being named Port Protection. Baker Point, the northwest point of Prince of Wales Island is named after the Discovery's 3rd Lieutenant Joseph Baker.

Remarkably, during Discovery's five-year voyage she lost only six sailors, all in accidents; none died from scurvy or violence.

Discovery Park in Seattle was named by Judge Donald S. Voorhees after the ship.

=== Diplomatic role ===
Discovery was meant to bring a resolution to the disposition of control over Nootka Sound. But despite four years of dispatches with their home governments, Vancouver and Quadra failed to formally conclude an agreement.

== Later years ==
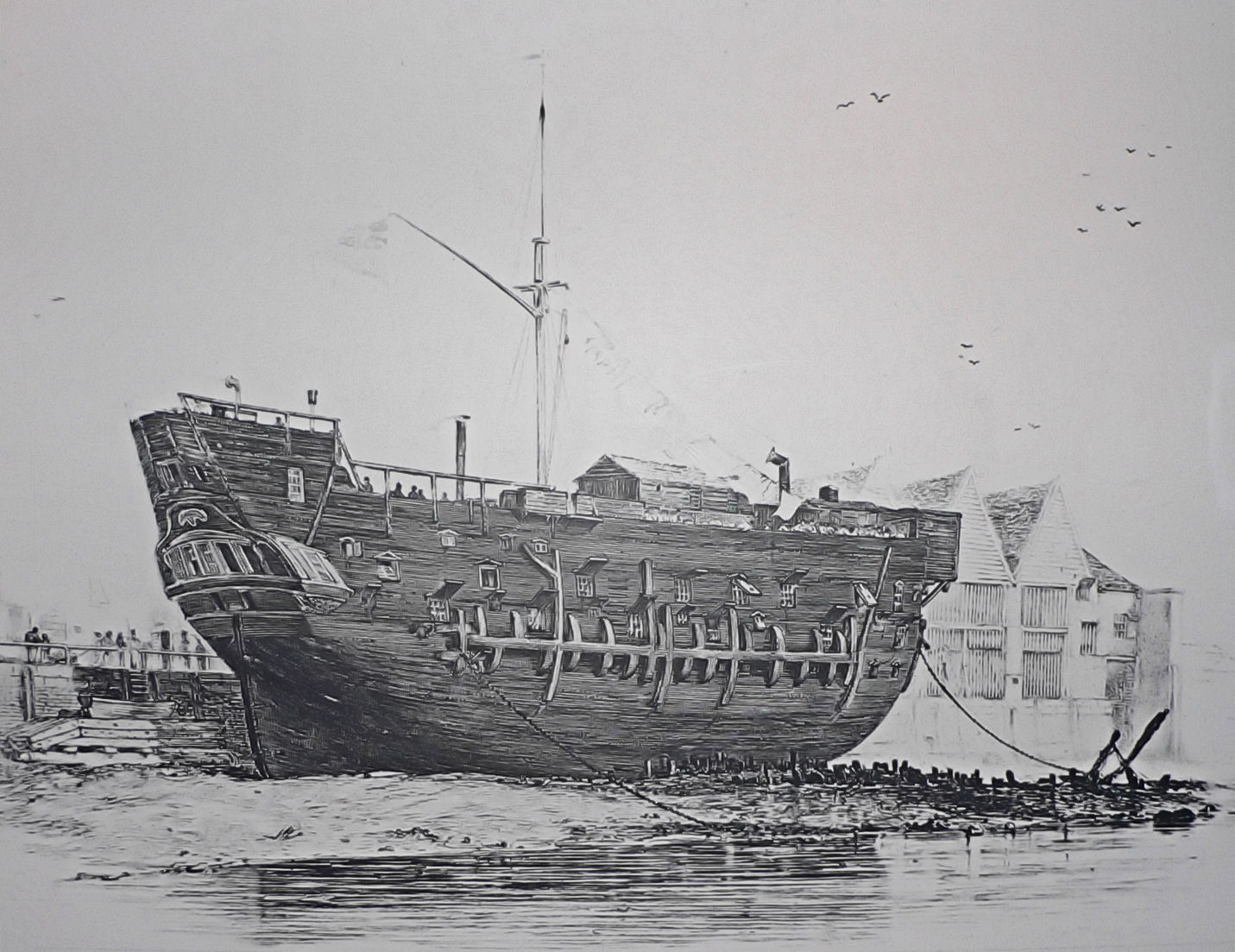
Discovery as a prison ship at Deptford on the River Thames by Edward William Cooke.

Discovery put into St Helena in July 1795. There on 2 July 1795 Discovery and the brig Chatham captured a Dutch East Indiaman, Makassar, which sailed in, unaware that the newly established Batavian Republic was at war with Great Britain. (Note: Makassar, under the command of Captain Frederik Markt, had been launched in 1787 and had a burthen of 1150 tons.) Some prize money was due to be paid in November 1824. (Note: A first-class share, such as would have accrued to Vancouver and Peter Puget (by then deceased), of Chatham, was worth £39 5s 0 3/4d; a fifth-class share, i.e., the share of a seaman, was worth 6s 11 1/2d.)

From there Vancouver and Discovery sailed in convoy with Sceptre, the East Indiaman General Goddard, their prizes, and a large number of other East Indiamen. They arrived at Shannon in September and Discovery sailed on to England.

After four years at sea, Discovery was in great need of a refit. She was laid up until 1798 when she was refitted as a bomb vessel and recommissioned under Commander John Dick.

In October 1800 Commander John Conn replaced Dick. Discovery participated in the Battle of Copenhagen in April 1801. In 1847 the Admiralty authorized the issuance of the Naval General Service medal with clasp "Copenhagen 1801" to all surviving claimants from the campaign.

On 4 August 1801, Discovery served with Nelson when he resolved to attack an enemy flotilla off Boulogne using Bomb vessels. On the night of 15 August, the British attacked in four divisions, with Conn in charge of four boats armed with howitzers. Discovery had one man wounded in the unsuccessful British attack. Discovery was then paid off in October, and laid up in ordinary in May 1802.

== Later career and fate ==
Discovery was recommissioned in May 1803 under Commander John Joyce, with Commander Charles Pickford replacing him in August. Pickford continued in command until 1805.

In 1807 Discovery was at Sheerness, serving as a hospital ship. She continued in this role until 1815.

In 1818 Discovery was converted to a prison ship at Woolwich. In 1824 she moved to Deptford, where she continued to serve as a prison hulk until at least 1831. She was broken up there in February 1834.

== Notable crew and passengers ==
Among the notable persons who served on Discovery's great voyage:

- Captain George Vancouver
- 1st Lieutenant Zachary Mudge – promoted to admiral in 1849
- 2nd Lieutenant Peter Puget – promoted to rear admiral in 1821
- 3rd Lieutenant Joseph Baker – post captain in 1809
- Master Joseph Whidbey – later a naval engineer noted for the breakwater at Plymouth
- Thomas Manby – initially master's mate, promoted to lieutenant on Discovery
- William Robert Broughton – initially in command of Chatham, later a rear-admiral
- Archibald Menzies – naturalist and surgeon
- Thomas Pitt, 2nd Baron Camelford – sent back to England in disgrace.
- Robert Barrie – commissioner of the dockyard at Kingston, Upper Canada

== See also ==
- European and American voyages of scientific exploration
