= Kulshan caldera =

Pleistocene caldera volcano

Coordinates: 48°50′0″N 121°43′0″W

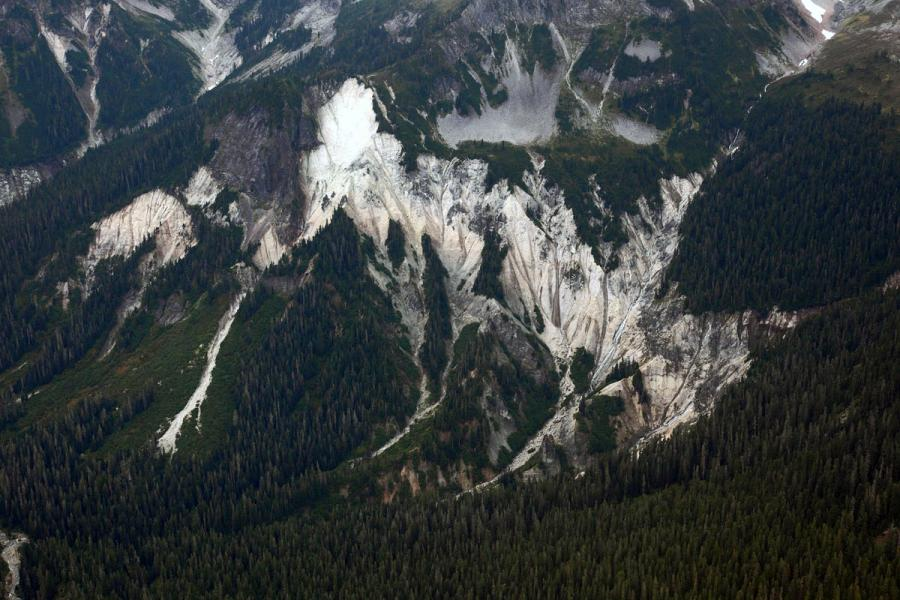
Kulshan caldera's intracaldera ignimbrite deposit near Upper Swift Creek

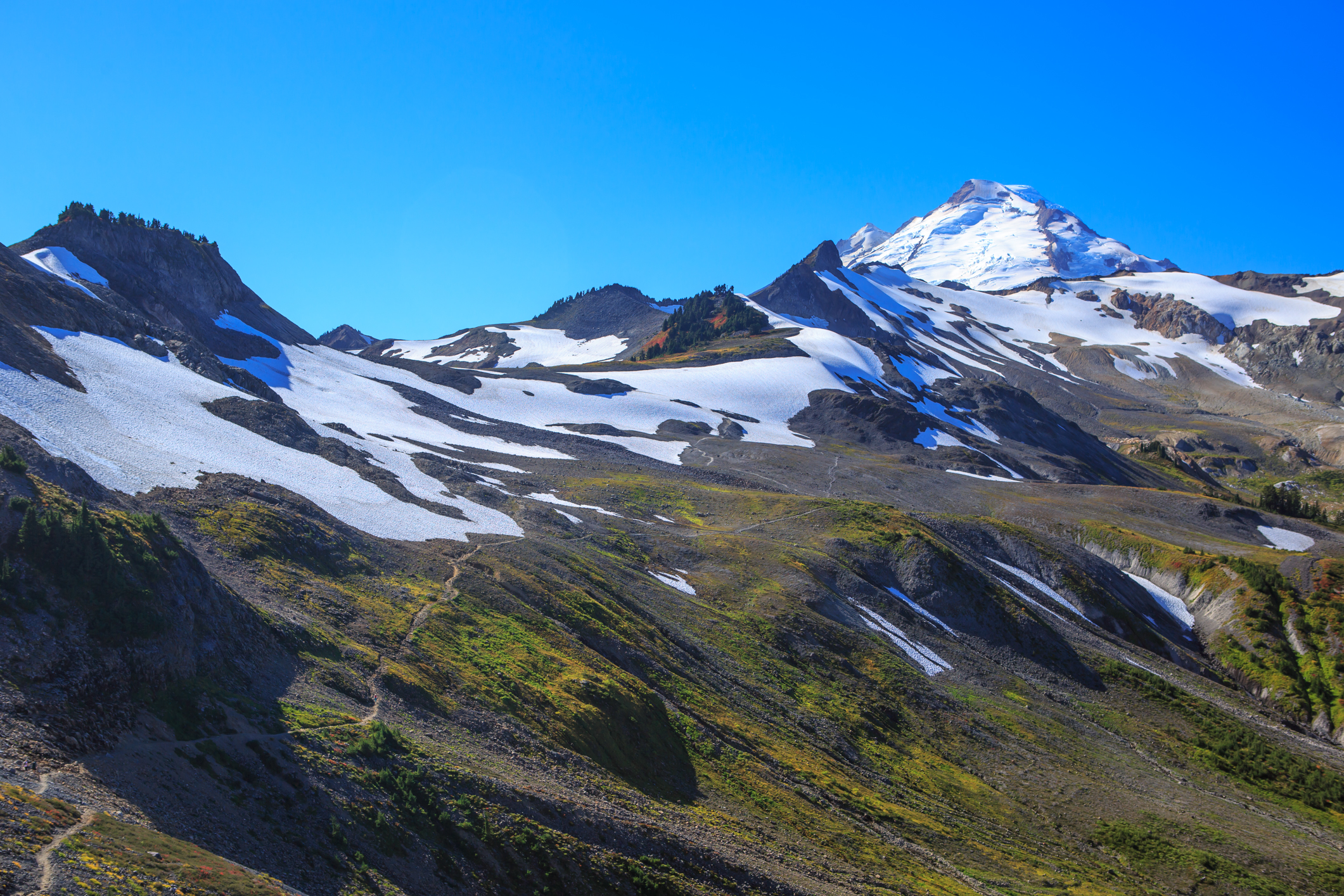
Ptarmigan ridge trail, overlooking Mt. Baker and the remnants of the Kulshan caldera rim.

The Kulshan caldera is a Pleistocene volcano in the North Cascades of Washington and one of the few calderas identified in the entire Cascade Range. It is the product of the Mount Baker volcanic field, which has a history stretching back to possibly 3.722 million years ago.

== Geology ==
=== Precaldera activity ===
About ten precaldera units have been identified, but none have been attributed to a major edifice like the Mount Baker we see today. Four of the ten units are composed mostly of rhyodacite which is similar in composition to the rhyodacite that was erupted in the climactic eruption. The other six are andesite dikes and scraps of dacite that are outside of the caldera margin; these six are prominent at Barometer Mountain, Slate Mountain, Chowder Ridge, Lake Ann, and Park Glacier. The rhyodacite units can be found at Dobbs Cleaver, Cougar Divide, Deadhorse Creek, and Swift Rainbow divide. Some of these dikes contain pyroclastic material which indicates that explosive activity occurred before the climactic eruption.

=== Climactic eruption ===
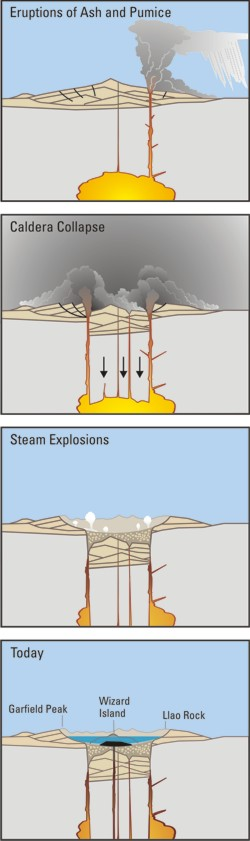
Process of caldera-collapse

Formation of the caldera about 1.149 million years ago was accompanied by the largest eruption in the history of the Mount Baker volcanic field. The eruption was subglacial, blasting upward through the continental ice sheet. Over 124 km^{3} (29.7 cubic miles) of rhyodacite magma erupted from a shallow magma chamber in an ultra-plinian eruption. The magma in this water/ice interaction was quenched and shattered in phreatomagmatic explosions to produce only small fragments of pumice. As the magma escaped from the shallow reservoir, the rock above it collapsed downward forming a massive 4.5 x 8 km (2.8 x 5 mi) depression. As the eruption progressed, the caldera was filled with up to 1,000 meters (3,280 ft.) of ignimbrite and tephra. Tephra fell beyond the limits of the ice sheet and is preserved today at Lake Tapps 125 mi (201 km) south of the caldera, and at Washtucna, Washington 300 km southeast of the caldera. While rhyodacite took up the bulk composition of the eruption some andesitic pumice can be sparsely found in the rhyodacite bands. After the eruption, subsequent glacial recession removed most of the tephra fallout near the caldera. Eventually stripping away all remnants of extracaldera ash flows. The eruption that created the caldera was significantly larger in volume than the one that produced Crater Lake in Oregon.

=== Postcaldera volcanism ===
After the climactic eruption between 1.149 and 0.99 million years ago, about a dozen dike-fed eruptions produced rhyodacitic lava domes and lava flows inside the caldera. Another volcanic phase 1.1 to 0.5 million years ago emplaced over 60 andesite dikes, the eruptive products of which have since been stripped away by glacial erosion. It is speculated that the eruptive rocks from this volcanic phase formed one or more large andesitic cone now completely removed.

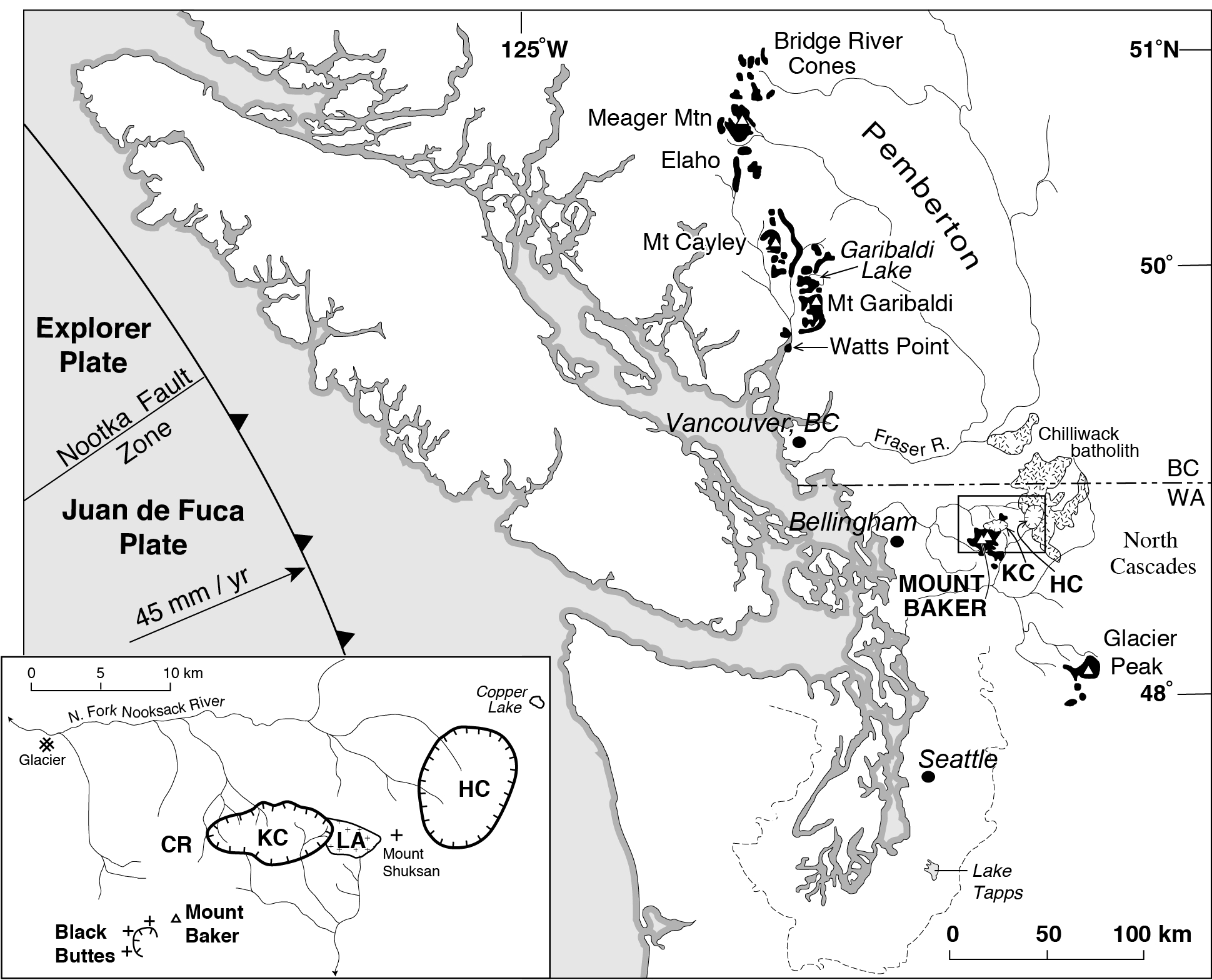
Location of the Kulshan caldera
