= Electricity in the Puget Sound region =

Overview of the electricity sector in the Puget Sound region

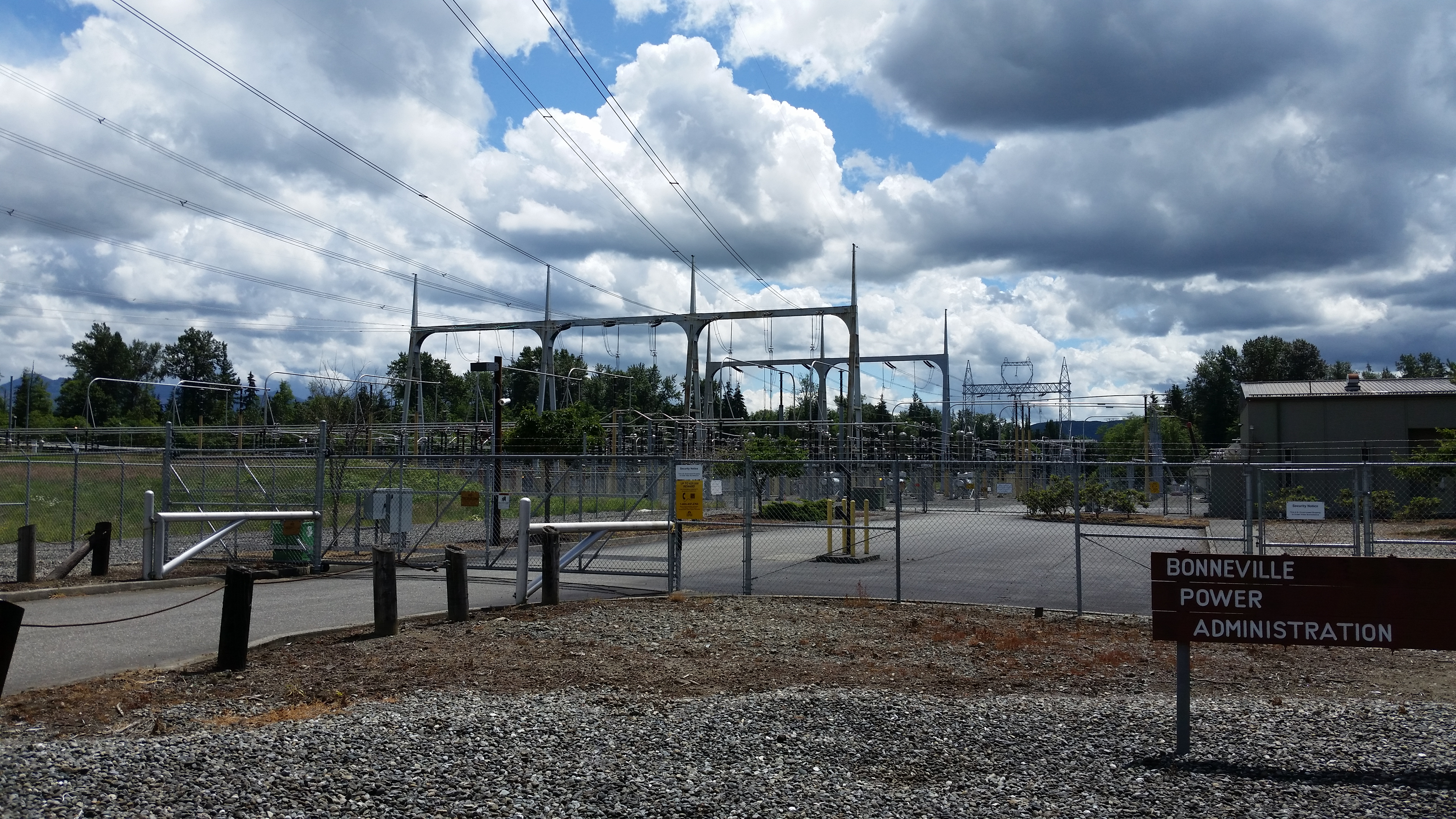
A Bonneville Power Administration substation in exurban Monroe

Electricity in the Puget Sound region is a significant factor in people's lives, an enabler for the modern economy, and has a unique relationship with the region's environment.

Suppliers include both public and private entities. Public entities include Seattle City Light and Tacoma Power, and several public utility districts. Private entities include Puget Sound Energy (PSE), formerly Puget Power. The largest suppliers are PSE with 1.1 million customers, or about a quarter of the population of the region, (Note: 1.1 million PSE customers, of the residents of Puget Sound region defined by Seattle–Tacoma–Olympia Combined Statistical Area, population 4.3 million in 2012) Seattle City Light with the city's entire population and some nearby areas totaling over 770,000 customers, and Snohomish County Public Utility District with 325,000 and Tacoma Power with 179,000.

== History ==
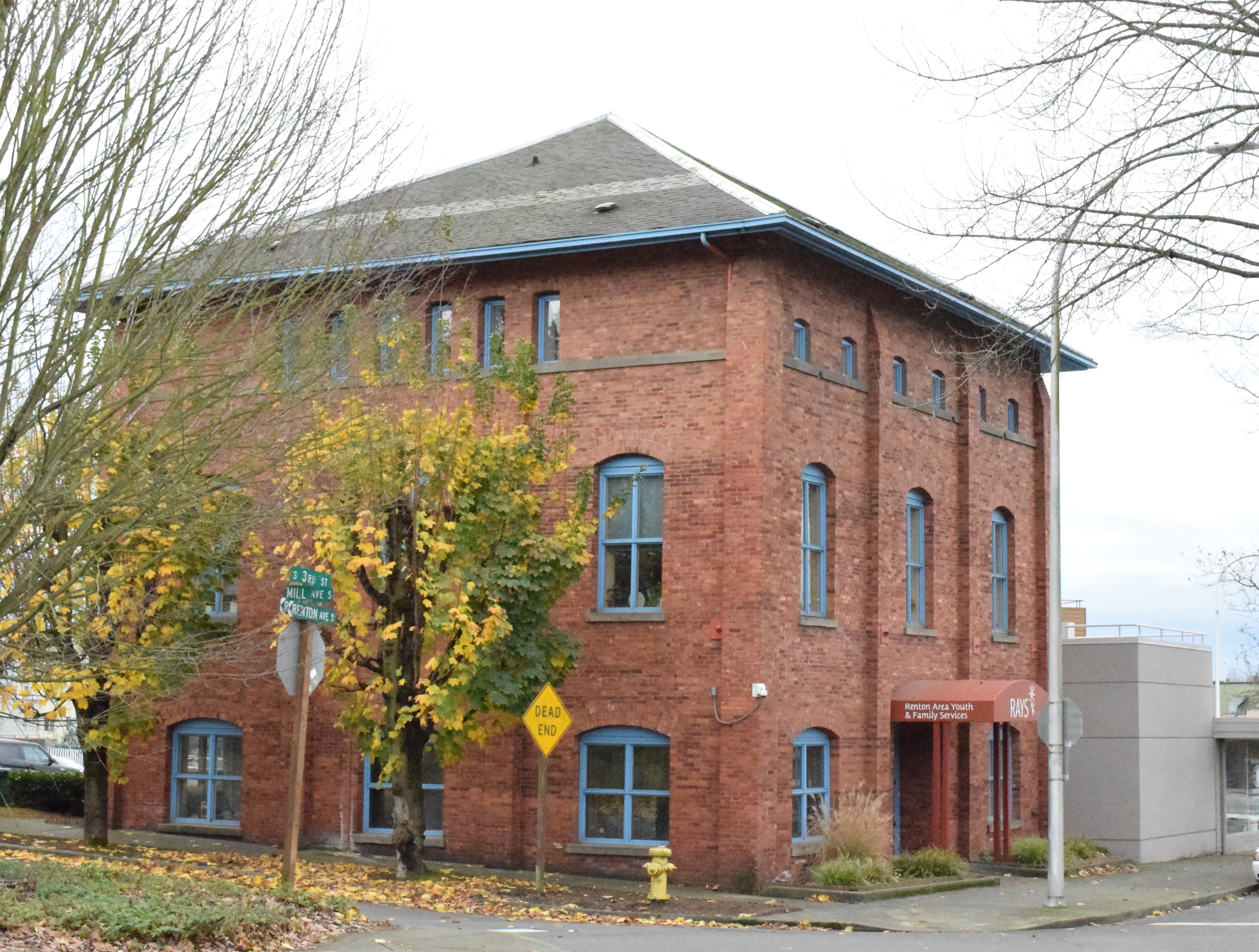
A former streetcar substation in downtown Renton, built 1898 or 1899

Seattle was electrified since shortly after its incorporation in 1869. (Note: The city was re-incorporated in 1869 and bears this year on its seal.) Gas street lamps were installed in part of the downtown area in 1874, but by 1886 (four years after Pearl Street Station was built in New York), the Seattle Electric Light Company had created the first incandescent lighting system west of the Rockies; in 1889 the James Street line became the first electric streetcar in the city.

Abundant electricity allowed local industries like Boeing to develop, and contributed to transportation such as the city's extensive electric trolley system and regional transportation like the Cascade Tunnel which exclusively carried an electric railway until the 1950s.

Some early hydroelectric projects like the now demolished Elwha Dam were built to power lumber mills, at one time at the root of the region's economy. (Note: "Socially as well as economically, lumber has exerted important influences in the life of the State." – Federal Writers' Project)

== Sources and costs ==
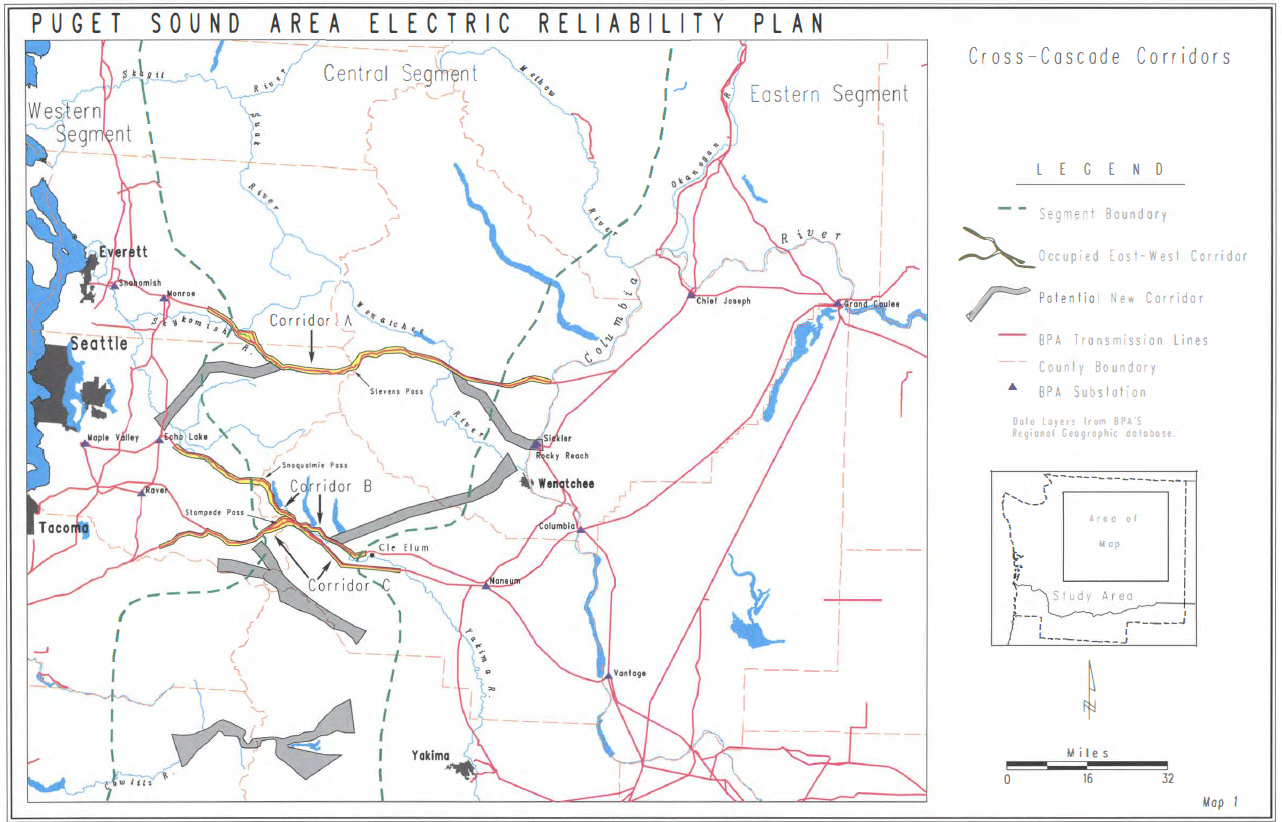
Cross-Cascades high voltage AC paths linking the Puget Sound region to Columbia River hydroelectric generation

The Puget Sound region produces more electricity than it consumes. The vast majority of the region's electricity is hydroelectricity from the Columbia River, with a contribution from Washington wind power and nuclear as well as local combined cycle natural gas, and some electricity is available via interties from Southern California in the winter (see Western Interconnection). Costs are among the lowest in the nation at an average 7.6 cents per kilowatt-hour in 2016. Historically this has been due to the large supply from public utility-owned sources. (Note: "[Tacoma] has a municipally owned power plant which distributes electricity at one of the lowest rates in the United States" – Federal Writers' Project)

== Regulation ==
Three investor-owned electric utilities in Washington (Avista (formerly Washington Water Power), PacifiCorp (formerly Pacific Power and Light Company), and Puget Sound Energy (PSE)) are regulated by the Washington Utilities and Transportation Commission (WUTC) which sets rates. Of the three only PSE operates in the Puget Sound area.

=== PUDs ===
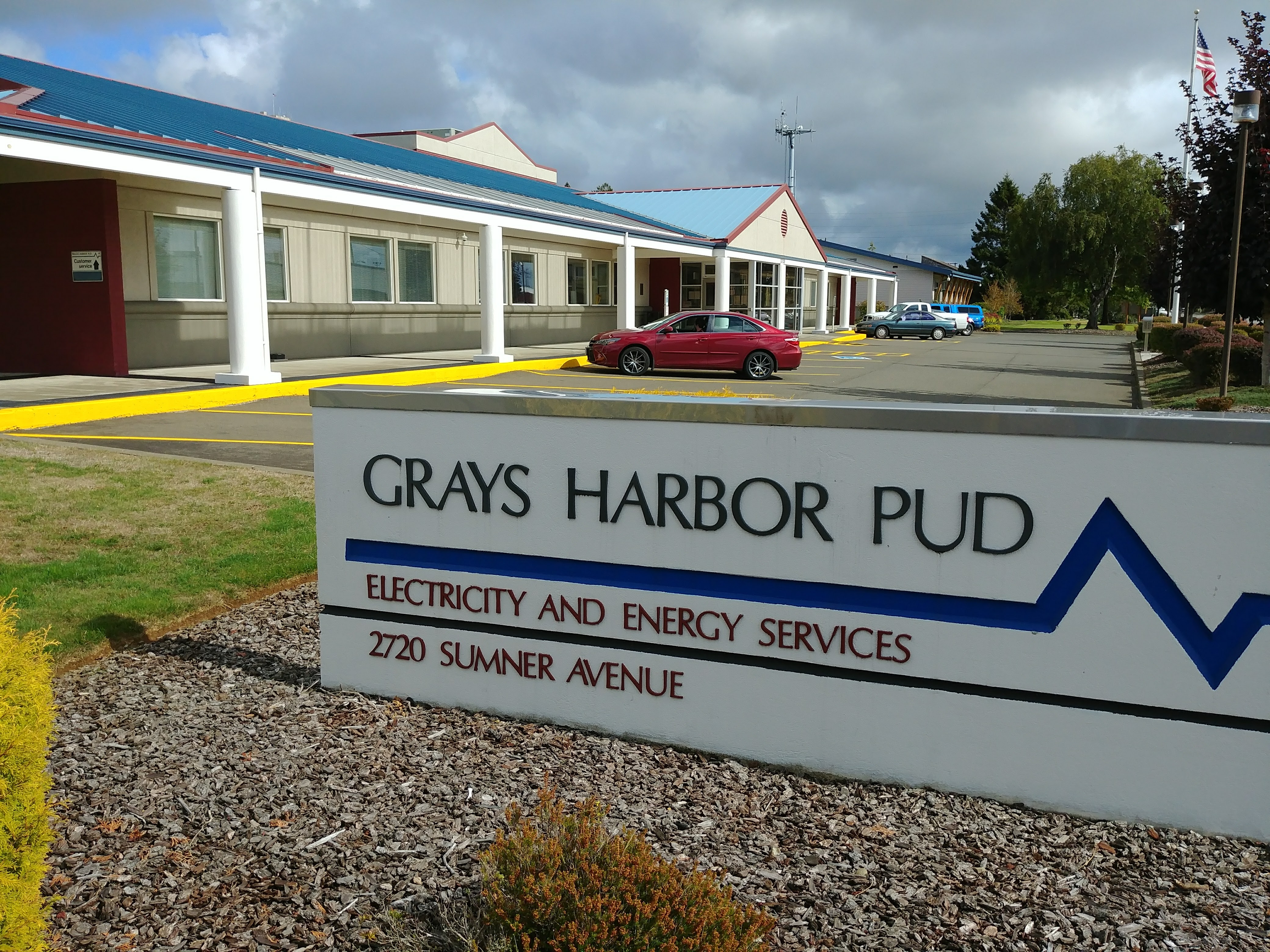
The headquarters of a Washington PUD

Public utility districts are independent taxation and regulation authorities and are not regulated by WUTC. All Puget Sound counties except Pierce and King have their own Public Utility District. The PUDs serve about one million customers across the entire state.

=== Net metering ===
Net metering up to 100 kW per customer is mandated to investor-owned energy companies by the state legislature, to include PSE in the Puget Sound region. Seattle City Light also participates in net metering. Net metering makes rooftop photovoltaic power (solar power) attractive to some homeowners in the Puget Sound area, although the region does not receive intense sun in the winter due to latitude and climate.

=== Environment and treaty rights ===
Environmental protection, especially of endangered salmonids, environmental restoration, and Native American treaty rights are of concern to many communities of interest in the Puget Sound region. The Federal Energy Regulatory Commission is a regulator that will be involved in future decision making. As of 2017, plans are underway to conduct restoration after decommissioning of the White River Hydroelectric Project.

== Infrastructure ==
=== Hydroelectric ===
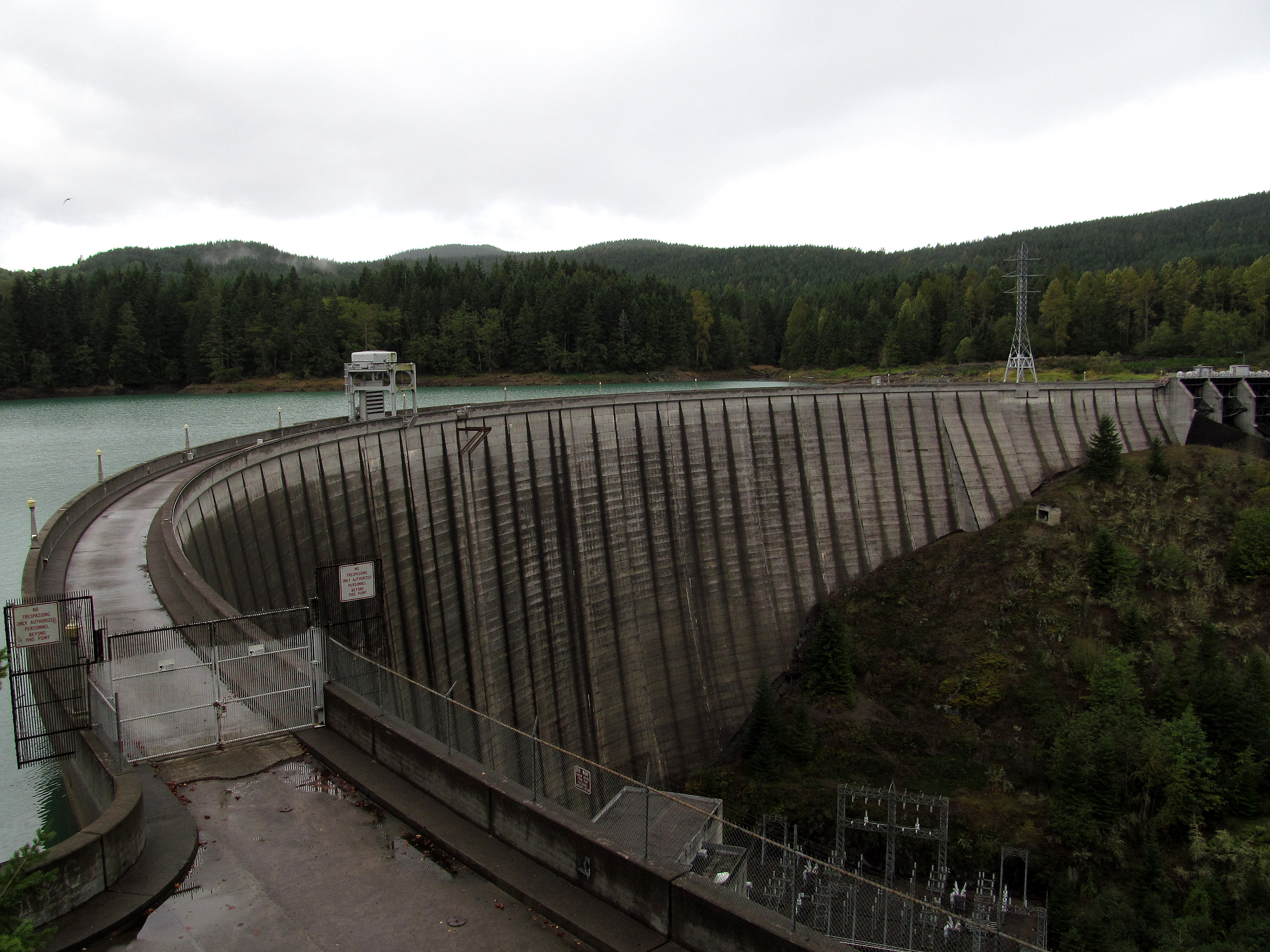
Alder Dam in Thurston County

Seattle City Light owns considerable infrastructure including the Skagit River Hydroelectric Project and high voltage transmission system. Tacoma Power owns Cushman Dam No. 1 and Cushman Dam No. 2 at Lake Cushman in the foothills of the Olympic Mountains. There is one coal power plant in the Puget Sound area, Centralia Power Plant, scheduled for shutdown by 2025. Packwood Lake Hydroelectric Project is owned by Energy Northwest (formerly Washington Public Power Supply System) which also operates a nuclear reactor in Eastern Washington. Snoqualmie Falls Hydroelectric Plant, which came online in 1899, is and the first underground power station in the world, and one of the first to use alternating current and aluminum long-distance transmission wires (to Seattle). Smaller hydroelectric facilities include Alder Dam on the Nisqually River, Nooksack Falls Hydroelectric Power Plant, Henry M. Jackson Hydroelectric Project on the Sultan River, Electron Hydroelectric Project on the Puyallup River, and Koma Kulshan Project on Mount Baker.

=== Transmission ===
Bonneville Power Administration owns a great deal of high-voltage transmission equipment and rights of way in the region. The last major transmission line west of the Cascades was built in the 1970s and a proposal to build a new 80-mile (130 km) 500 kV line between Castle Rock and Troutdale (near Portland) was killed in 2017.

A major transmission line upgrade project in suburban Seattle is the ongoing Energize Eastside Project.

=== Proposed or abandoned nuclear plants ===
In 1969 the Seattle City Council approved purchase of Kiket Island to build two city-owned nuclear power plants, but the plan was dropped before construction began. Instead, Seattle began an intensive energy conservation campaign called Kill-A-Watt. Another plan to build a Skagit Nuclear Power Plant also never materialized. The Satsop Nuclear Power Plant west of Olympia was conceived in the early 1970s partly in response to inadequate power resources in the region, and canceled after more than five years of construction during the early 1980s recession due to decreased demand and stagflation, resulting in the largest municipal bond default in history at the time. As of 2017, Columbia Generating Station at the Hanford Site is the only nuclear power reactor in Washington and there are no nuclear power plants in Western Washington. (Note: Western Washington has had research reactors e.g. More Hall Annex at the University of Washington in Seattle)

=== Other proposals ===
Proposed future infrastructure includes the Juan de Fuca Cable Project, an underwater high voltage DC intertie crossing Strait of Juan de Fuca to Vancouver Island in Canada, which would supply Puget Sound consumers with abundant Canada wind power. Tidal power has also been proposed as a future source, and a pilot tidal turbine project undertaken by Snohomish County PUD, said to be the first of its kind in the world, was abandoned in 2014.

== Reliability ==
=== Climate and weather effects ===
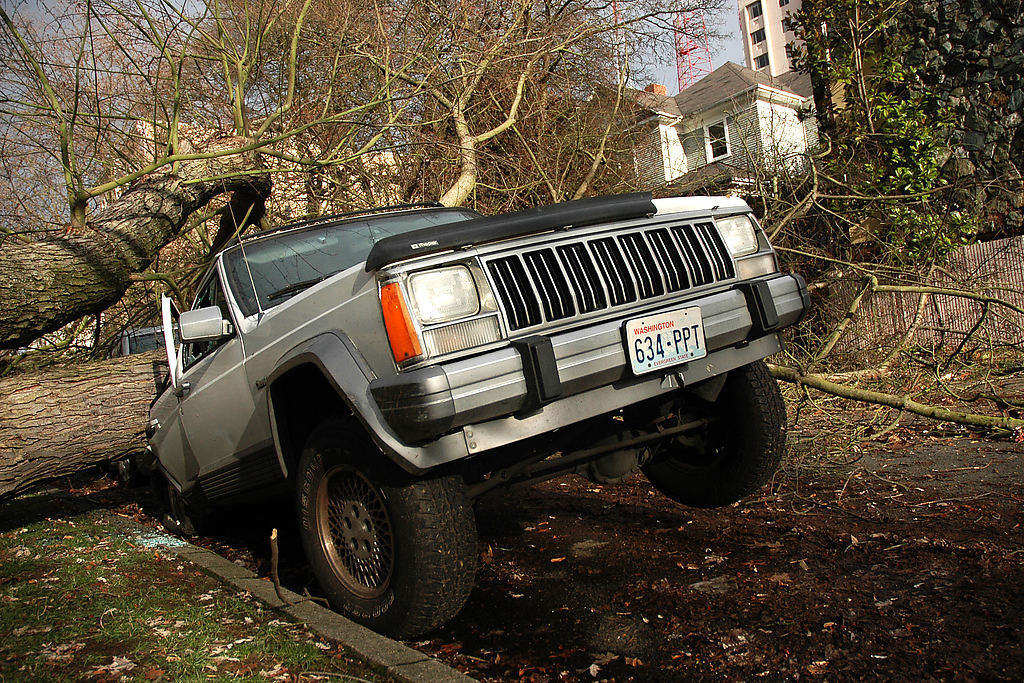
The Hanukkah Eve windstorm of 2006 was the latest of many windstorms causing widespread damage to the Puget Sound region

Pacific Northwest windstorms, usually in the late fall and early winter, can result in power outages affecting hundreds of thousands of people at a time in the Puget Sound region. Half of Seattle was without electric power after the Hanukkah Eve windstorm of 2006. 463,000 were without power in the Puget Sound area and an additional 500,000 in southern British Columbia after an unusually early windstorm in late August, 2015. 750,000 people were without electric power after the January 20, 1993 Inaugural Day Storm. The Columbus Day Storm of 1962 left one million people without electric power in Oregon and Washington, including nearly all of Tacoma and much of Seattle, and complete outage at Seattle-Tacoma International Airport.

=== System capacity and reliability ===
Beginning in 1989 when record electric consumption was recorded for cold-weather heating (the region uses electric space heating extensively), and following rapid population growth, the regional system was deemed "severely stressed"; in 1990 it was several hundred megawatts over its reliable peak limit. Also beginning in the late 20th century, interconnections to other regional grids made summer power outages like one in 1996 possible.
