= Snoqualmie =

Snoqualmie might refer to:

== People ==
- Snoqualmie people, a Coast Salish people of Washington state

- Snoqualmie Indian Tribe, a federally recognized tribe of Snoqualmie people

== Places ==
- Snoqualmie Indian Reservation
- Snoqualmie Valley, ancestral home to the Snoqualmie tribe
- Snoqualmie, Washington, a city in King County, Washington
- The Snoqualmie River
  - Snoqualmie Falls, a large waterfall on the Snoqualmie River
- Snoqualmie Pass, a mountain pass over the Cascade Range
- Snoqualmie Pass, Washington, a census designated place (CDP) in Kittitas County, Washington
- Snoqualmie Mountain, a mountain near Snoqualmie Pass
- Mount Baker–Snoqualmie National Forest

== Other ==
- Snoqualmie Valley School District, a public school district serving the city of Snoqualmie and surrounding areas
- Snoqualmie Depot, a rail depot in Snoqualmie owned by the Northwest Railway Museum
- The Summit at Snoqualmie, a winter resort located at Snoqualmie Pass, Washington
- Snoqualmie, a wine label produced by the Ste. Michelle Wine Estates division of Altria
- Snoqualmie (fireboat), Seattle's first fireboat
