= Snoqualmie, Washington =

- City
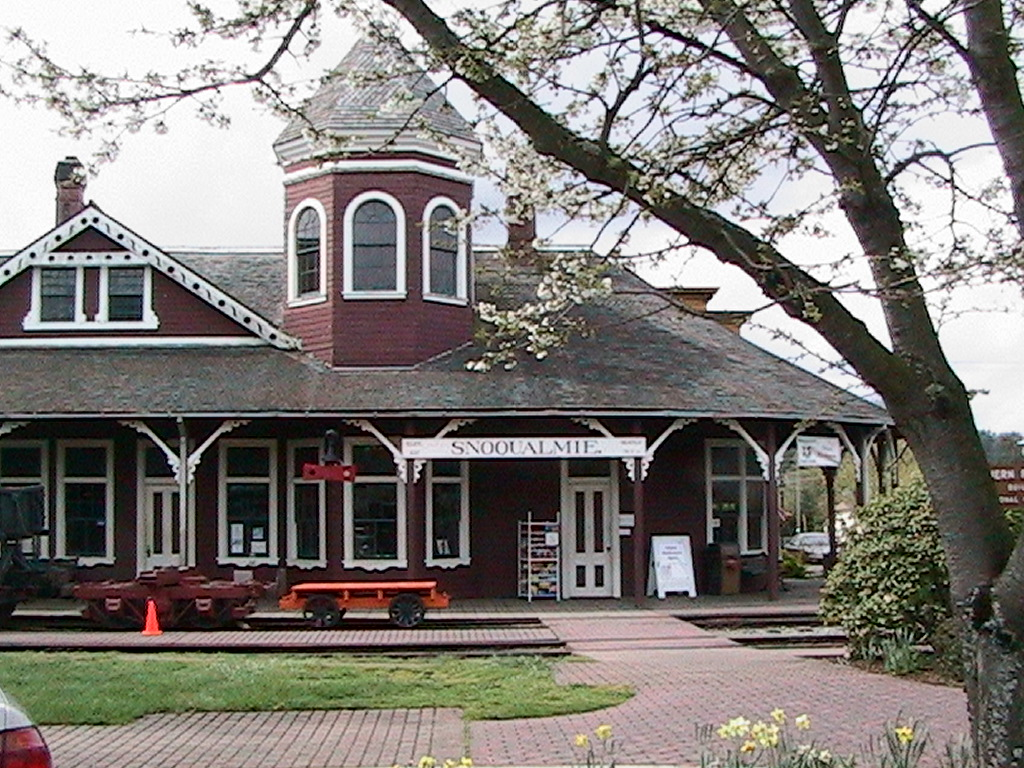
- Snoqualmie Depot

- Location within King County
- Coordinates: 47°32′05″N 121°51′30″W
- Country: United States
- State: Washington
- County: King

Government
  - Type: Mayor–council
  - Mayor: James Mayhew

Area
  - Total: 7.42 sq mi (19.22 km^{2})
  - Land: 7.18 sq mi (18.59 km^{2})
  - Water: 0.24 sq mi (0.63 km^{2})
- Elevation: 568 ft (173 m)

Population (2020)
  - Total: 14,121
- Time zone: UTC−8 (PST)
  - Summer (DST): UTC−7 (PDT)
- ZIP Code: 98065
- Area code: 425
- FIPS code: 53-65205
- GNIS feature ID: 2411915
- Website: www.snoqualmiewa.gov

Snoqualmie (/snoʊˈkwɔːlmi/ snow-KWAWL-mee) is a city next to Snoqualmie Falls in King County, Washington, United States. It is 28 miles (45 km) east of Seattle. Snoqualmie is home to the Northwest Railway Museum. The population was 14,121 at the 2020 census.

== Etymology ==
The name "Snoqualmie" comes from the name of the indigenous people of the same name. It is an Anglicization of the Lushootseed name sdukʷalbixʷ, which means "people of the moon".

== History ==
The second written record of the exploration of the Snoqualmie Valley comes from the notes of Samuel Hancock, who ventured up-river with the Snoqualmie tribe in 1851 in search of coal. Near the current location of Meadowbrook Bridge, Hancock was told by his guides that the land was known as Hyas Kloshe Illahee, or "good/productive land". Hancock took this useful information back with him to the area now known as Tacoma. The area that is now Snoqualmie had been continuously occupied by members of the Snoqualmie Tribe and their ancestors for at least 13,000 years.

During the 1850s, tensions were very high between the native populations and the new settlers claiming the land as their own. In 1856, in response to these tensions, Fort Alden was built near a Snoqualmie village, in the area that would become Snoqualmie. After the Treaty War ended, Fort Alden was abandoned (along with other forts built around this time).

The most successful early pioneer in the Valley was Jeremiah Borst, who arrived in the spring of 1858 over the Cedar River trail from the eastern side of the mountains. He settled in the area that formerly held Fort Alden, and used his sales of pigs and apples in Seattle to buy out much of the surrounding land from other settlers.

As successful as farming was, other settlers had different methods of working the land. The first lumber mill in the Snoqualmie Valley was established at the mouth of Tokul Creek around 1872 by Watson Allen. Within five years, there were 12 logging operations on the Snoqualmie River, providing lumber to the entire Seattle region. Within 15 years, logging and mill work was employing 140 men and sending millions of board feet of logs down the river.

In 1882, the Hop Growers Association was founded by three Puget Sound partners, who used land purchased on Snoqualmie Prairie from Jeremiah Borst to create a farm that would eventually cover 1,500 acres (6.1 km^{2}), 900 acres (3.6 km^{2}) of which was devoted solely to hops. This extremely successful venture (billed as "The Largest Hop Ranch in the World") would fall prey to a combination of market and pest factors, and fell into relative obscurity by the end of the 1890s.

By the late 19th century, the Puget Sound region was growing, but bypassed by the major railways. In response, a group of Seattle entrepreneurs funded and built their own railway in an attempt to cross the Cascade Range. The Seattle, Lake Shore and Eastern Railway opened up the natural resources of the Snoqualmie Valley to the markets of the world, and brought in tourists to enjoy the natural beauty of the area and to marvel at the Falls.

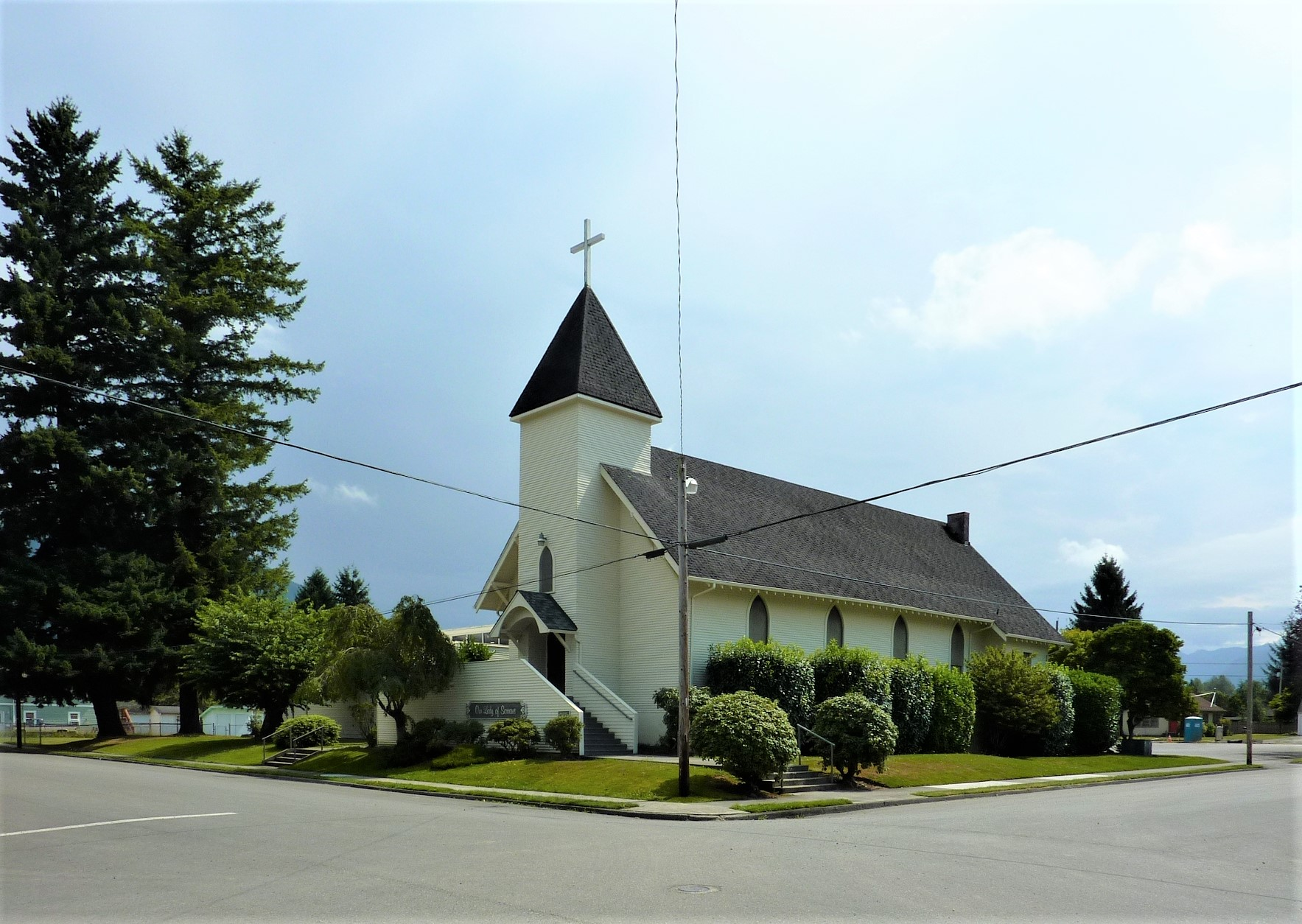
Our Lady of Sorrows Church in Snoqualmie

The increased interest in the area led to a marked increase in speculation. Originally, the area that would become North Bend was platted as "Snoqualmie" in February 1889 by Will Taylor but later changed to "North Bend" by pressure from Seattle, Lake Shore and Eastern Railway & U.S. Post Office Department to avoid confusion. The area that is currently Snoqualmie was platted in August of that same year as "Snoqualmie Falls" by investors from Seattle. The oral history of the area places the first residents of Snoqualmie as Edmund and Louisa Kinsey, who established the first hotel, livery, general store, dance hall, post office, and meat market – in addition to helping build the first church in the town. Two of their sons (out of six children) are most famous for their photography documenting the early timber works in the region.

The Snoqualmie Falls Hydroelectric Plant, the first power plant at the Falls, was built in the late 1890s by Charles Baker, an investor from Seattle who had assisted in the platting of the city. This development provided both power and jobs to the region, and a small company town grew up near the falls to house the workers. More than 100 years later, Baker's original generators are still in use by Puget Sound Energy.

The official vote for incorporation of "Snoqualmie Falls" as the city of Snoqualmie occurred in 1903. At the time, land prices had not decreased since initially set in 1889 — prices that did not reflect the financial reality of the region. In response to these high prices, people had created a large "squatting" community, building where they wanted regardless of land ownership or interests. The first challenge that the city council faced was lowering lot prices and migrating these buildings off the public right-of way, establishing the basic layout of the town that exists to this day.

In 1917, a new all-electric lumber mill (the second in the U.S.) opened across the river from Snoqualmie, along with the company town associated with it, Snoqualmie Falls. For the first half of the century, the timber industry provided the city and valley with a stable source of income and employment, even as World War I drew away workers and the Great Depression took its toll across the nation.

This prosperity was moderated during the Depression, and with the changes in culture and mobility in the latter half of the century, Snoqualmie and the majority of the valley stagnated. The city was bypassed when US-10 was built across the Cascades (now Interstate 90), and this led to a shift in commerce to the east (into North Bend) and west (into the Bellevue/Issaquah areas).

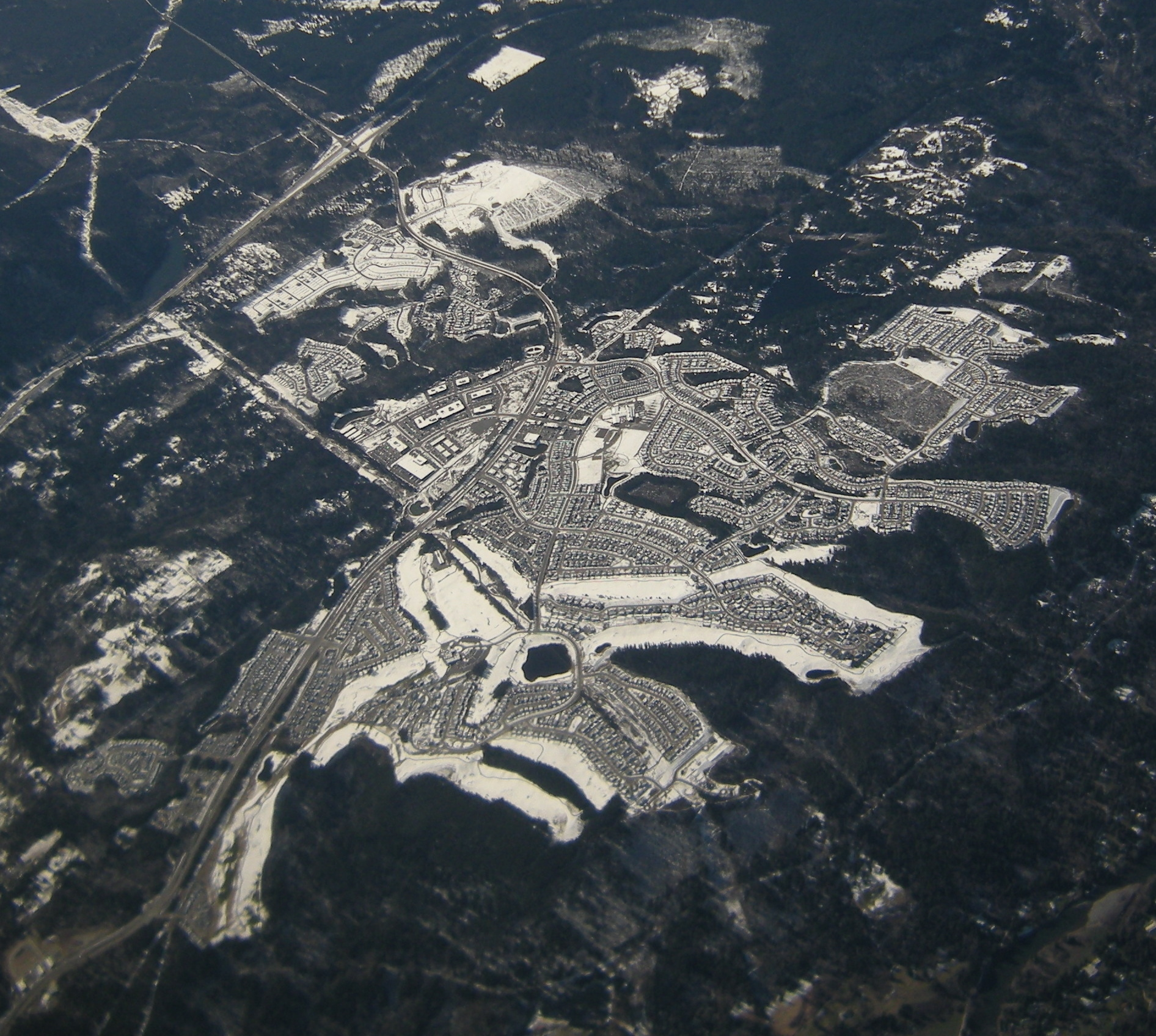
Aerial image of Snoqualmie Ridge on a snowy day (2009)

By the 1960s, the homes that had made up the company town of Snoqualmie Falls had been moved to other locations within the valley, and the city's population had stabilized to a growth rate of roughly 11 people per year over the next 30 years (from 1,216 in 1960 to 1,546 in 1990).

This slow growth cycle continued until the mid-1990s, when the city annexed 1,300 acres (5.3 km^{2}) of undeveloped land that became the site of the current "master-planned" community of Snoqualmie Ridge, now referred to as Snoqualmie Ridge I. Snoqualmie Ridge I includes 2,250 dwelling units, a business park, a neighborhood center retail area and The Club at Snoqualmie Ridge, a private, PGA Tour-sanctioned golf course. Snoqualmie Ridge II, annexed in 2004, contains an additional 1,850 dwelling units, a hospital and a limited amount of additional retail.

The city council has continued to balance the desire to retain the rural and historical feel of Snoqualmie with the needs of a growing population. The city's historic downtown underwent a major renovation to improve its infrastructure and make the area more attractive to visitors to the valley's many natural attractions. As of 2023, Snoqualmie has continued to experience growth and development, with new residential and commercial projects being completed, including the Snoqualmie Hospital in 2015, the Snoqualmie Inn, new restaurants, and more townhomes. In addition, the city has continued to provide many parks and recreation facilities, including a network of trails and public spaces such as the Snoqualmie Community Park, built in 2009.

In 2012, the city of Snoqualmie annexed 593 acres (240 ha) of the former Weyerhaeuser mill site and mill pond (Borst Lake). The former mill office now hosts Dirtfish, an advanced rally car driver training school. The site is one of the largest undeveloped industrial zoned sites in King County, although significant planning and environmental review for potential future use remains to be done. The facility hosted a round of the 2014 Global RallyCross Championship.

== Geography ==
According to the United States Census Bureau, the city has a total area of 6.51 square miles (16.86 km^{2}), of which 6.40 square miles (16.58 km^{2}) are land and 0.11 square miles (0.28 km^{2}) are water.

Snoqualmie has many local parks including Fisher Creek Park, Jeanne Hansen Park, Snoqualmie Community Park, Snoqualmie Point Park and Centennial Fields.

=== Surrounding cities and communities ===
Snoqualmie is bordered by the nearby areas of Fall City, North Bend and Preston, WA.

=== Climate ===
Snoqualmie has a warm-summer Mediterranean climate (Köppen Csb), or an oceanic climate (Köppen Cfb) when the 30 millimetres (1.2 in) threshold is used.

Climate data for Snoqualmie, Washington (1991–2020 normals, extremes 1899–2021)
Month	Jan	Feb	Mar	Apr	May	Jun	Jul	Aug	Sep	Oct	Nov	Dec	Year
Record high °F (°C)	67 (19)	75 (24)	81 (27)	90 (32)	97 (36)	114 (46)	104 (40)	102 (39)	98 (37)	95 (35)	75 (24)	67 (19)	114 (46)
Mean maximum °F (°C)	57.9 (14.4)	62.9 (17.2)	69.1 (20.6)	75.4 (24.1)	81.7 (27.6)	85.5 (29.7)	89.5 (31.9)	88.2 (31.2)	84.6 (29.2)	75.8 (24.3)	61.8 (16.6)	57.1 (13.9)	92.8 (33.8)
Mean daily maximum °F (°C)	46.4 (8.0)	49.6 (9.8)	53.7 (12.1)	58.9 (14.9)	64.1 (17.8)	69.0 (20.6)	75.8 (24.3)	76.7 (24.8)	70.4 (21.3)	59.5 (15.3)	51.1 (10.6)	45.8 (7.7)	60.1 (15.6)
Daily mean °F (°C)	41.1 (5.1)	42.4 (5.8)	45.4 (7.4)	49.5 (9.7)	55.1 (12.8)	59.8 (15.4)	64.9 (18.3)	65.2 (18.4)	59.7 (15.4)	51.5 (10.8)	44.7 (7.1)	40.7 (4.8)	51.7 (10.9)
Mean daily minimum °F (°C)	35.8 (2.1)	35.3 (1.8)	37.2 (2.9)	40.1 (4.5)	46.1 (7.8)	50.6 (10.3)	54.0 (12.2)	53.7 (12.1)	49.1 (9.5)	43.5 (6.4)	38.3 (3.5)	35.7 (2.1)	43.3 (6.3)
Mean minimum °F (°C)	23.1 (−4.9)	24.2 (−4.3)	27.6 (−2.4)	30.4 (−0.9)	35.1 (1.7)	42.6 (5.9)	45.3 (7.4)	45.6 (7.6)	39.7 (4.3)	31.0 (−0.6)	26.4 (−3.1)	24.6 (−4.1)	20.2 (−6.6)
Record low °F (°C)	−1 (−18)	−3 (−19)	8 (−13)	24 (−4)	26 (−3)	31 (−1)	36 (2)	35 (2)	30 (−1)	23 (−5)	2 (−17)	3 (−16)	−3 (−19)
Average precipitation inches (mm)	8.64 (219)	5.83 (148)	6.74 (171)	5.29 (134)	4.04 (103)	3.15 (80)	1.24 (31)	1.22 (31)	3.02 (77)	6.22 (158)	9.47 (241)	8.42 (214)	63.28 (1,607)
Average snowfall inches (cm)	1.5 (3.8)	0.2 (0.51)	0.3 (0.76)	0 (0)	0 (0)	0 (0)	0 (0)	0 (0)	0 (0)	0 (0)	0.1 (0.25)	1.5 (3.8)	3.6 (9.1)
Average precipitation days (≥ 0.01 in)	20.8	15.1	20.3	19.1	15.1	12.5	7.0	5.8	10.0	16.1	20.5	18.9	181.2
Average snowy days (≥ 0.1 in)	0.8	0.3	0.2	0	0	0	0	0	0	0	0.2	0.8	2.3
Source 1: NOAA
Source 2: The Weather Channel

== Economy ==
Until recently, logging and Weyerhaeuser's milling operations were the mainstays of the local economy. Since 1989, the company has run a much smaller mill operation, and ceased all operations at the Weyerhaeuser Mill Site in 2003. While dairies were a significant local industry into the early 1950s, agriculture is no longer a major economic force in the community. With the completion of Interstate 90 in the 1970s, Snoqualmie became more accessible to Seattle and the Eastside region, resulting in more residents working in the communities to the west.

The Snoqualmie Ridge Business Park was developed in the 1990s on 180 acres (73 ha) of land that was divided into parcels for over a dozen facilities. It employs over a thousand people, of which a majority live within the city. The business park's major employers include Space Labs, Motion Water Sports, Technical Glass, T-Mobile, Zetec, and the King County Department of Permitting and Environmental Review. Philips Oral Healthcare has hundreds of employees in Snoqualmie that manufacture the Sonicare electric toothbrush.

The city is also home to a tourism industry that developed due to the scenic and recreational attractions in the area. The Snoqualmie Falls and adjacent Salish Lodge are a major attraction adjacent to Puget Sound Energy's Snoqualmie Fall Park that draw 1.5 million annual visitors. The Northwest Railway Museum in downtown Snoqualmie owns a historic depot and operates heritage railway rides. The Snoqualmie Indian Tribe owns the Snoqualmie Casino, which opened in 2008 a few miles outside city center.

== Demographics ==
Historical population
Census	Pop.	Note	%±
1910	279		—
1920	450		61.3%
1930	752		67.1%
1940	775		3.1%
1950	806		4.0%
1960	1,216		50.9%
1970	1,260		3.6%
1980	1,370		8.7%
1990	1,546		12.8%
2000	1,631		5.5%
2010	10,670		554.2%
2020	14,121		32.3%
2021 (est.)	13,810		−2.2%
U.S. Decennial Census; 2018 Estimate

=== 2020 census ===
As of the 2020 census, Snoqualmie had a population of 14,121 and a median age of 36.0 years. 34.0% of residents were under the age of 18 and 6.3% of residents were 65 years of age or older. For every 100 females there were 97.2 males, and for every 100 females age 18 and over there were 92.8 males age 18 and over.

98.9% of residents lived in urban areas, while 1.1% lived in rural areas.

There were 4,552 households in Snoqualmie, of which 56.9% had children under the age of 18 living in them. Of all households, 71.5% were married-couple households, 8.2% were households with a male householder and no spouse or partner present, and 15.7% were households with a female householder and no spouse or partner present. About 11.1% of all households were made up of individuals and 3.4% had someone living alone who was 65 years of age or older.

There were 4,674 housing units, of which 2.6% were vacant. The homeowner vacancy rate was 0.3% and the rental vacancy rate was 4.0%.

Racial composition as of the 2020 census
Race	Number	Percent
White	10,172	72.0%
Black or African American	173	1.2%
American Indian and Alaska Native	84	0.6%
Asian	1,888	13.4%
Native Hawaiian and Other Pacific Islander	16	0.1%
Some other race	250	1.8%
Two or more races	1,538	10.9%
Hispanic or Latino (of any race)	912	6.5%

=== 2013 study ===
In April 2013, the city of Snoqualmie retained the Economic Development Council of Seattle and King County (EDC) to conduct research and make recommendations that would guide and support a marketing effort aimed at increasing occupancy in the Snoqualmie Ridge Business Park. The city was also interested in recommendations for the use of the Snoqualmie Mill site, and in an estimate of the potential for additional land absorption at Snoqualmie Ridge. EDC issued its final report in September 2013, with updated demographic information about Snoqualmie. The highlights are summarized here.

The average household income in this area is estimated to be $135,386 for the current year (2013), while the average household income is estimated to be $90,874 for King County, $108,160 for Bellevue, $111,460 for Issaquah, $74,847 for Washington, and $70,968 for the United States, for the same time frame. The average household income in this area is projected to increase 5.6% over the next five years, from $135,386 to $142,906. The United States is projected to have a 4.8% increase in average household income.

Education levels are also high. Currently, it is estimated that 9.0% of the population age 25 and over in this area had earned a Master's, Professional, or Doctorate Degree and 24.3% had earned a bachelor's degree. In comparison, for the United States, it is estimated that for the population over age 25, 8.9% had earned a Master's, Professional, or Doctorate Degree, while 15.5% had earned a bachelor's degree.

The age distribution of the population shows that approximately 35% of the residents are children (age 0–19), 51% are age 20–54, and 14% are 55 and older. Thus the community is primarily a home for working families. Average household size is approximately 3.07; a "typical" household is two adults and one child. The current year median age for this population is 34.2, while the average age is 31.2. Five years from now, the median age is projected to be 35.1. The current year median age for the United States is 36.5, while the average age is 37.7. Five years from now, the median age is projected to be 37.2.

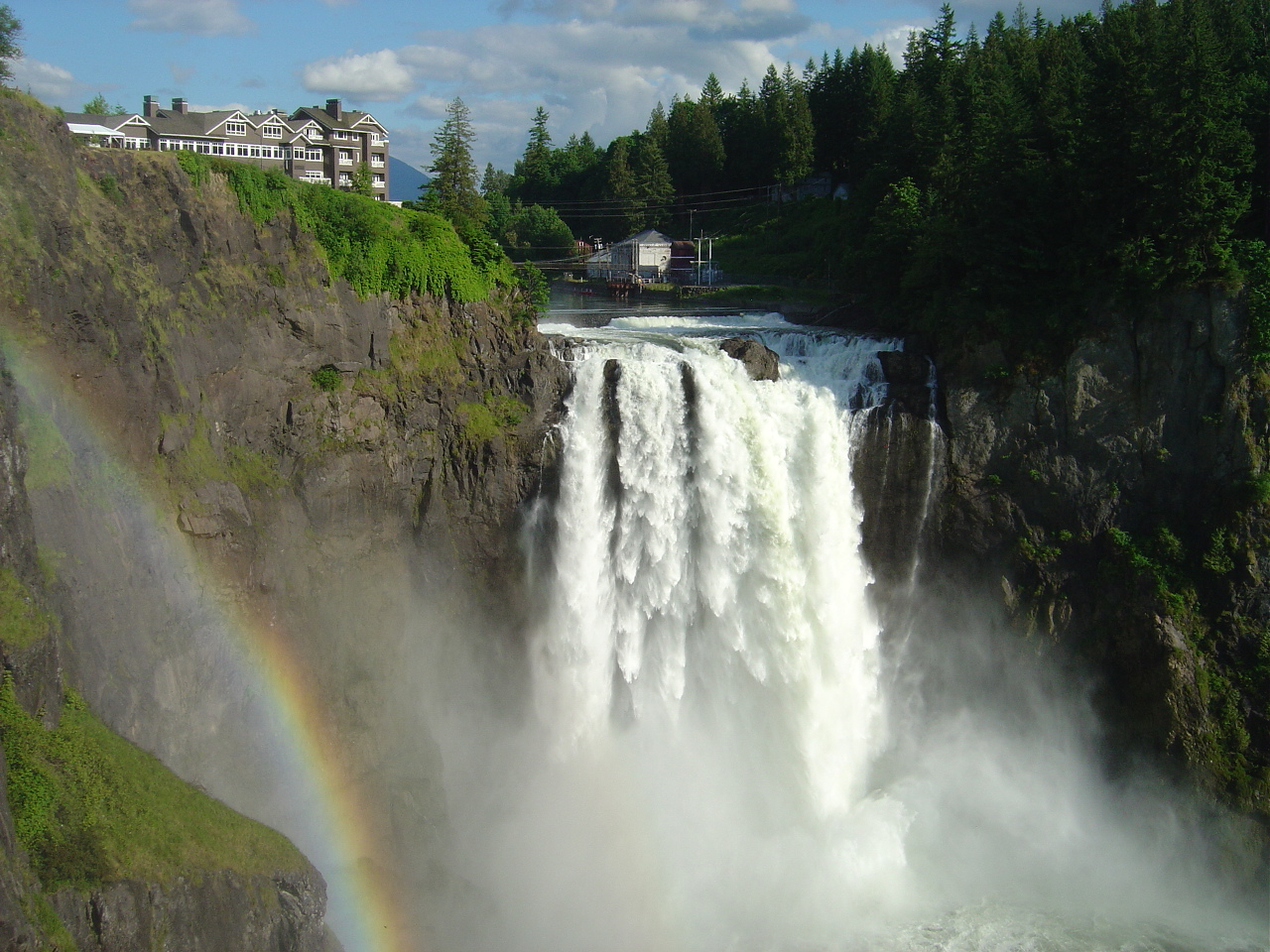
Snoqualmie Falls is featured notably in Twin Peaks.

=== 2010 census ===
As of the 2010 census, there were 10,670 people, 3,547 households, and 2,912 families residing in the city. The population density was 1,667.2 inhabitants per square mile (643.7/km^{2}). There were 3,761 housing units at an average density of 587.7 per square mile (226.9/km^{2}). The racial makeup of the city was 83.3% White, 0.8% African American, 0.9% Native American, 9.3% Asian, 0.1% Pacific Islander, 1.4% from other races, and 4.4% from two or more races. Hispanic or Latino of any race were 5.3% of the population.

There were 3,547 households, of which 55.4% had children under the age of 18 living with them, 71.3% were married couples living together, 7.7% had a female householder with no husband present, 3.1% had a male householder with no wife present, and 17.9% were non-families. 13.1% of all households were made up of individuals, and 1.7% had someone living alone who was 65 years of age or older. The average household size was 3.01 and the average family size was 3.33.

The median age in the city was 33.7 years. 35% of residents were under the age of 18; 3.1% were between the ages of 18 and 24; 38.9% were from 25 to 44; 19.2% were from 45 to 64; and 3.9% were 65 years of age or older. The gender makeup of the city was 50.0% male and 50.0% female.

== Government and police ==
Presidential Elections Results
Year	Republican	Democratic	Third Parties
2020	30.62% 2,358	65.75% 5,063	3.62% 279

From 2014 to 2026, the Snoqualmie Police Department provided law enforcement services to the neighboring city of North Bend.

== City landmark ==
The city of Snoqualmie has designated the following landmark:

Landmark	Built	Listed	Address	Photo
Snoqualmie Historic Commercial District	1889–1941	1997	Railroad Avenue vicinity	

== Popular culture ==
Many of the exterior shots for David Lynch and Mark Frost's Twin Peaks television series and movie (Fire Walk with Me) were filmed in Snoqualmie and in the neighboring towns of North Bend and Fall City. The municipal government of Snoqualmie and some local businesses have embraced the town's association with the show, which continues to be a significant driver of tourism in the area. The Snoqualmie chamber of commerce collaborated in organizing the first Twin Peaks Fan Festival in 1992 from August 14–16, anticipating the release of Fire Walk With Me, which premiered early at the North Bend Theatre with a live introduction by Lynch himself. Subsequently, a smaller fan-organized festival was held from 1993 to 2019. Since 2023, an officially proclaimed "Real Twin Peaks Day" has been celebrated on the 24th of February, and in 2024, star Kyle MacLachlan attended the festivities. Several attempts have been made to permanently install a "Welcome To Twin Peaks" sign on Snoqualmie's Reinig Road, but they are usually stolen or vandalized shortly after being placed.

Actress Ella Raines was born on August 6, 1920, in Snoqualmie Falls, a mill town across the Snoqualmie River that is now part of Snoqualmie.

== Sister cities ==
Snoqualmie has the following sister cities:

- Gangjin, South Korea
- Chaclacayo, Peru
