= Snoqualmie Casino =

Casino in Snoqualmie, Washington

- Interactive map of Snoqualmie Casino
- Location: Snoqualmie, Washington, United States; 37500 SE North Bend Way, Snoqualmie, WA 98065; 47°31′8″N 121°50′31″W
- Opened: November 6, 2008; 17 years ago
- Gaming space: 170,000 sq ft (16,000 m^{2})
- Notable restaurants: Vista, 12 Moons, Falls Buffet, Cafe & Deli, and Drip
- Owner: Snoqualmie Indian Tribe
- Architect: Bergman Walls & Associates
- Website: snocasino.com

Snoqualmie Casino is a casino in Snoqualmie, Washington owned by the Snoqualmie Indian Tribe. It opened on November 6, 2008. The 170,000 sq ft (16,000 m^{2}) facility hosts 1,700 slots, 54 table games, 5 dining venues, an 11,000 sq ft (1,000 m^{2}) entertainment venue and a sportsbook.

The $400 million expansion began construction in 2022 and opened in August 2025, adding a ten-story hotel with 210 rooms, additional gaming space, a larger convention center, a spa, and a fitness facility.

== Gaming ==
=== Slots ===
1,700 slot machines including Triple Fortune Dragon, 50 Lions, Aztec Fortune, etc.

=== Table Games ===
54 table games including Blackjack, Craps, Roulette, Baccarat, etc.

=== Sportsbook ===
The Snoqualmie Casino had the first sportsbook operation in Washington when it began accepting sports bets in September 2021. It was later followed by the Angel of the Winds Casino in Arlington and Muckleshoot Casino in Auburn.

== Awards ==
- "Minority Business of the Year", Living Snoqualmie, 2019
- "Top 5 Places to Work in Washington", Living Snoqualmie, 2020
- "Best of 425", 425 Magazine, 2021
