= The Club at Snoqualmie Ridge =

Golf club in Snoqualmie, Washington

- Location within the United States Location within Washington (state)
- 47.535°N 121.860°W

Club information
- Location: Snoqualmie, Washington, U.S.
- Elevation: 575–870 ft (175–265 m)
- Established: 1999; 27 years ago
- Type: Private
- Operator: Arcis Golf (2013–present) through 2016; PGA Tour TPC Network
- Total holes: 18
- Tournaments: Boeing Classic (2005−present)
- Greens: Poa annua
- Fairways: Poa annua
- Website: clubatsnoqualmieridge.com
- Designed by: Jack Nicklaus
- Par: 72
- Length: 7,264 yd (6,642 m)
- Course rating: 76.1
- Slope rating: 146
- Course record: 60 – Kevin Sutherland; August 25, 2018

The Club at Snoqualmie Ridge is a private golf club in the northwest United States, located in Snoqualmie, Washington, 25 miles (40 km) east of Seattle, at the foothills of the Cascade Range.

Designed by Jack Nicklaus, the championship golf course opened in 1999 and was formerly a member of the Tournament Players Club network operated by the PGA Tour. Since 2005, it has hosted the Boeing Classic, a 54-hole PGA Tour Champions event in August. The course varies in elevation from 575 to 870 feet (175 to 265 m) above sea level, with the 18th green at 745 feet (227 m).

When the project was initially announced 40 years ago in 1986, the course was to be designed by Rees Jones.

The club left the TPC network in 2016 and was renamed "The Club at Snoqualmie Ridge" in December. Arcis Equity of Dallas purchased the course in 2013 from BrightStar Golf Group of Carlsbad, California, who had owned it for five years; the original owner was Quadrant Homes, then a Weyerhaeuser subsidiary.

The course record is 60 (–12), set by Kevin Sutherland in 2018, during the second round of the Boeing Classic on Saturday, August 25. The previous record of 61 was carded by Scott Simpson twelve years earlier, in the second round of the 2006 edition. It was equaled the next day by Tom Jenkins, but both finished one shot out of the playoff, in a five-way tie for third.

== Scorecard ==
The Club at Snoqualmie Ridge
| Tee | Rating/Slope | 1 | 2 | 3 | 4 | 5 | 6 | 7 | 8 | 9 | Out | 10 | 11 | 12 | 13 | 14 | 15 | 16 | 17 | 18 | In | Total |
| Black | 75.8 / 143 | 554 | 410 | 462 | 426 | 475 | 226 | 375 | 529 | 207 | 3664 | 353 | 484 | 426 | 210 | 448 | 590 | 380 | 211 | 498 | 3600 | 7264 |
| Gold | 73.9 / 140 | 530 | 388 | 439 | 400 | 445 | 207 | 354 | 518 | 196 | 3477 | 324 | 462 | 412 | 181 | 431 | 557 | 368 | 186 | 482 | 3403 | 6880 |
| Par | | 5 | 4 | 4 | 4 | 4 | 3 | 4 | 5 | 3 | 36 | 4 | 4 | 4 | 3 | 4 | 5 | 4 | 3 | 5 | 36 | 72 |
| Blue | 71.7 / 137 | 514 | 372 | 424 | 376 | 413 | 189 | 336 | 507 | 180 | 3311 | 283 | 455 | 395 | 156 | 410 | 526 | 352 | 174 | 460 | 3211 | 6522 |
| White | 70.2 / 129 | 486 | 356 | 409 | 325 | 392 | 172 | 323 | 479 | 149 | 3091 | 269 | 427 | 369 | 136 | 404 | 502 | 321 | 153 | 439 | 3020 | 6111 |
| SI | | 7 | 13 | 3 | 1 | 9 | 17 | 5 | 11 | 15 | | 14 | 2 | 4 | 18 | 6 | 10 | 12 | 16 | 8 |
| Women's | 71.4 / 129 | 452 | 328 | 391 | 263 | 362 | 134 | 243 | 451 | 111 | 2735 | 237 | 383 | 332 | 111 | 278 | 480 | 275 | 134 | 419 | 2649 | 5384 |
| SI | Women's | 5 | 9 | 3 | 7 | 11 | 17 | 13 | 1 | 15 | | 10 | 6 | 8 | 18 | 16 | 2 | 12 | 14 | 4 |
