= Snoqualmie Falls =

Waterfall on the Snoqualmie River in Washington State, United States

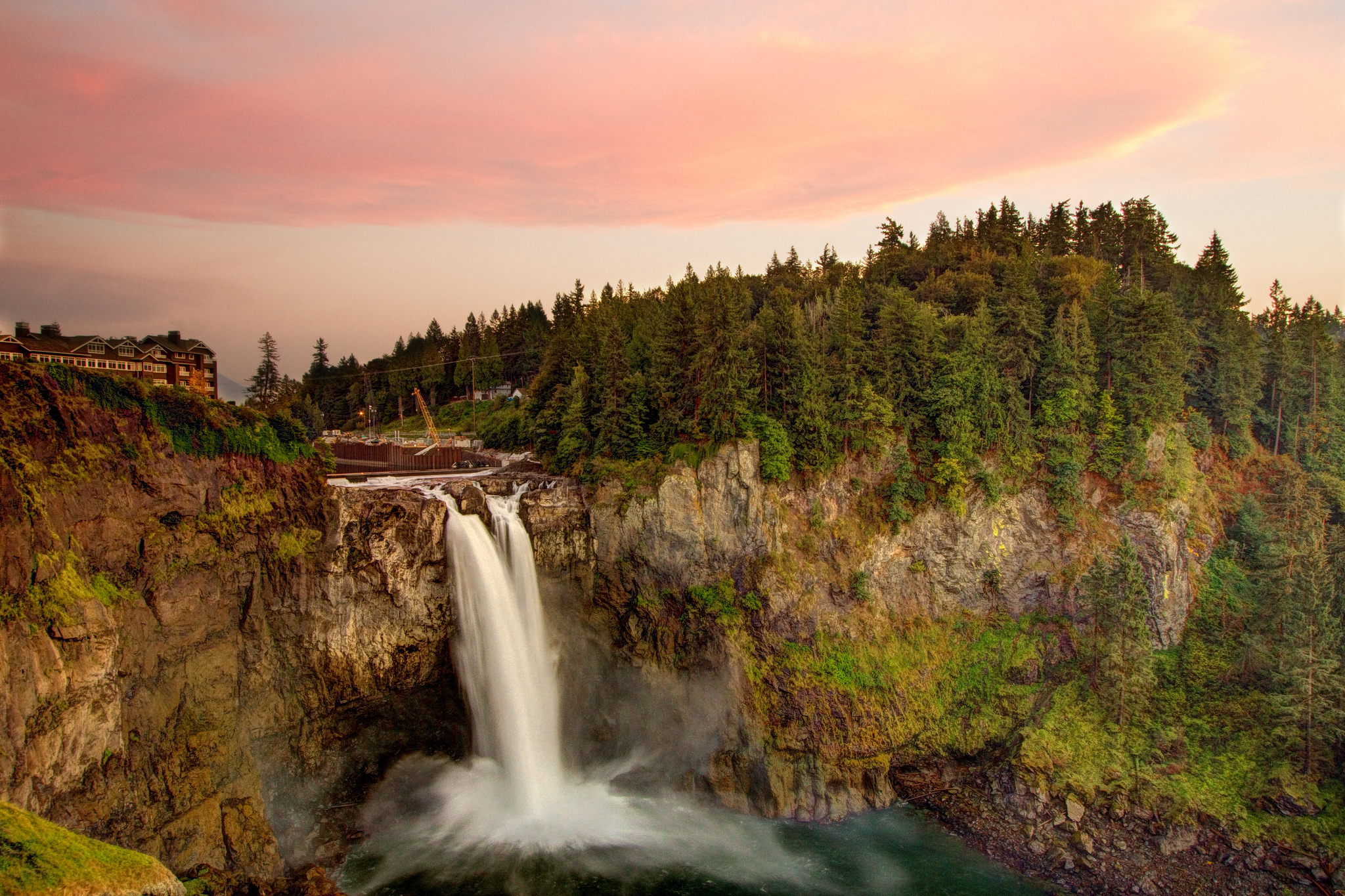
- September 2012
- Interactive map of Snoqualmie Falls
- Location: West of Snoqualmie, Washington, U.S.
- Coordinates: 47.5415°N 121.8373°W
- Type: Curtain
- Total height: 268 ft (82 m)
- Number of drops: 1
- Average width: 100 ft (30 m)
- Watercourse: Snoqualmie River
- Snoqualmie Falls
- U.S. National Register of Historic Places
- Location within Washington (state) Location within the United States
- Location: Snoqualmie River below crossing of State Route 522, King County, Washington
- Nearest city: Snoqualmie, Washington
- NRHP reference No.: 92000784
- Added to NRHP: September 2, 2009

Snoqualmie Falls is a 268-foot (82 m) waterfall in the northwest United States, located east of Seattle on the Snoqualmie River between Snoqualmie and Fall City, Washington. It is one of Washington's most popular scenic attractions and is known internationally for its appearance in the television series Twin Peaks. More than 1.5 million visitors come to the Falls every year, where there is a two-acre (0.8 ha) park, an observation deck, luxury lodge, spa, restaurant, and a gift shop.

Most of the river is diverted into power plants, but at times the river is high enough to flow across the entire precipice, which creates an almost blinding spray. High water occurs following a period of heavy rains or snow followed by warm rainy weather. This can occur during the rainy season which lasts from November through March. During high water, the falls take on a curtain form.

For the Snoqualmie People, who have lived since time immemorial in the Snoqualmie Valley in western Washington, Snoqualmie Falls is central to their culture, beliefs, and spirituality. A traditional burial site, to the Snoqualmie, the falls are "the place where First Woman and First Man were created by Moon the Transformer" and "where prayers were carried up to the Creator by great mists that rise from the powerful flow." The mists rising from the base of the waterfall are said to serve to connect Heaven and Earth.

The falls were first nominated for the National Register of Historic Places in 1992 as a Traditional Cultural Property for its association with the beliefs of the Snoqualmie people. However, the property owner, Puget Sound Energy, objected to the listing. The falls were subsequently determined eligible for listing in the National Register. The owners rescinded their objection and on September 2, 2009, the falls were formally listed in the National Register.

In October 2019, the Snoqualmie Indian Tribe purchased the Salish Lodge as well as 45 acres of surrounding land for $125 million.

== History ==
=== Ownership ===
In 2007, the Muckleshoot tribe purchased the Salish Lodge and were transferred ownership on October 9, 2007.

The Muckleshoot planned to build a hotel, conference center, and 175 homes above Snoqualmie Falls. Members of the Snoqualmie Indian Tribe opposed the project for its proximity to burial grounds and the Snoqualmie Falls. In 2015, the Snoqualmie Indian Tribe launched the "Save Snoqualmie Falls" campaign. In October 2018, the Muckleshoot received approval from the Snoqualmie City Council to develop a 182-room hotel, convention center, and up to 210 homes.

On October 31, 2019, the Snoqualmie Indian Tribe closed on purchasing Snoqualmie Falls, the Salish Lodge and Spa, the Snoqualmie Falls Gift Shop, and 45 acres of property north of and across State Route 202. The tribe purchased it for $125 million, effectively halting the Muckleshoot's development plans. The Salish Lodge will, however, continue to be managed by the Seattle-based company Columbia Hospitality. The purchase was announced the following day on November 1, 2019. The tribe called its purchase a further effort to "reclaim its traditional lands" and "stop irresponsible development".

== Power plants ==
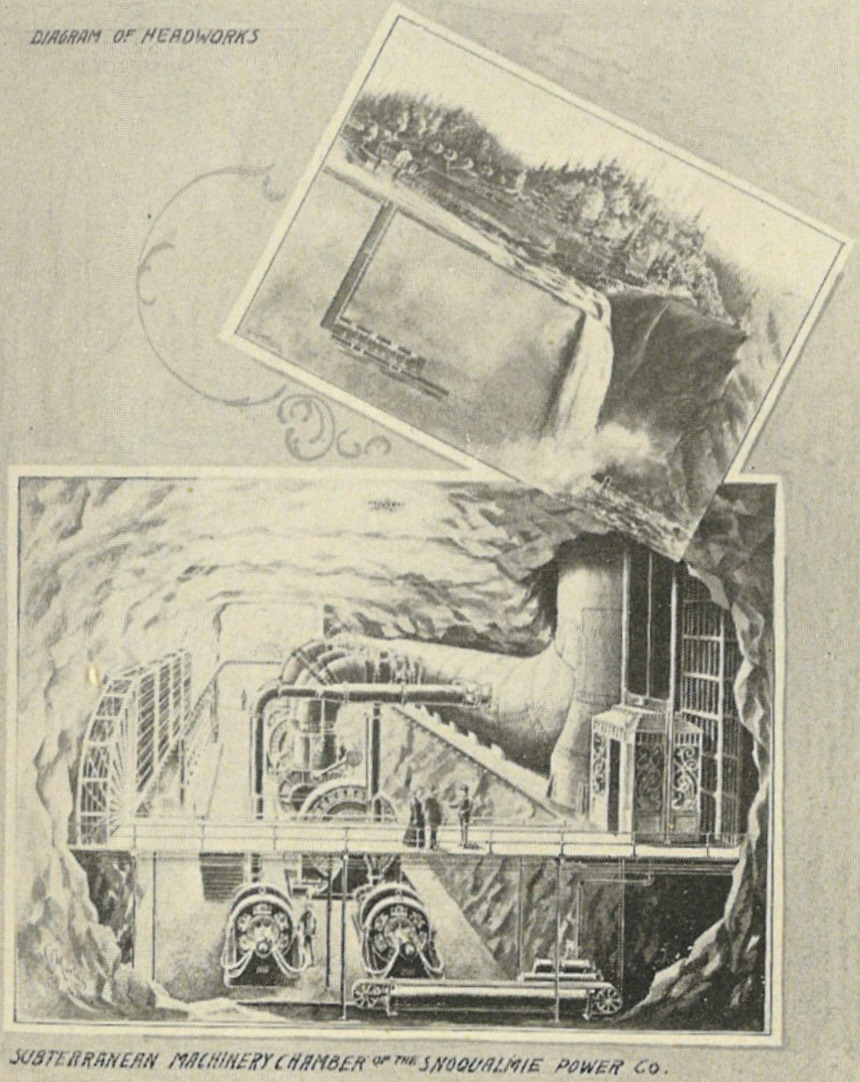
Cutaway diagrams of Power Plant 1

The Snoqualmie Falls Hydroelectric Plant is at Snoqualmie Falls, currently operated by Puget Sound Energy. It is made of two power houses, Plant 1 and Plant 2. Plant 1 was built in 1899 and operates at the base of the falls embedded in the rock 270 feet (82 m) below the surface. It was the world's first completely underground power plant. Plant 2 was built in 1910 and further expanded in 1957, and is located a short distance downstream of the falls. Approximately 1% of Puget Sound Energy sales comes from the plant.

The 1899 generating system was designated an ASCE Civil Engineering Landmark in 1981.

== Namesake town ==
The town of Snoqualmie Falls was located near the waterfall. It was associated with the Weyerhaeuser mill there. It had many structures, including a hospital, a school, community center, and many homes. When the town disbanded, many houses were moved to the nearby town of Snoqualmie. The 1940s and '50s film actress Ella Raines was born in Snoqualmie Falls.

== Hiking ==
The top of the waterfall is less than 100 yards (90 m) from the parking lot, which has a gift shop, espresso stand, and bathrooms. The main views are from the side of the falls, with a fence separating visitors from the edge of a cliff. This area has picnic tables and benches, and a small grassy meadow called the Centennial Green, where weddings are performed through the summer.

Here, the river trail descends 374 feet (110 m) in 0.7 mi (1126 m), passing through temperate rain forest with moss covered Bigleaf Maple, Douglas-fir, Sword Fern and Salal and places to step off the trail and rest or enjoy the scenery. Heavy use makes wildlife sightings uncommon. The park does allow pets. At the bottom of the trail is the 1910 powerhouse, not open to visitors, and a view of the falls.

== Gallery ==
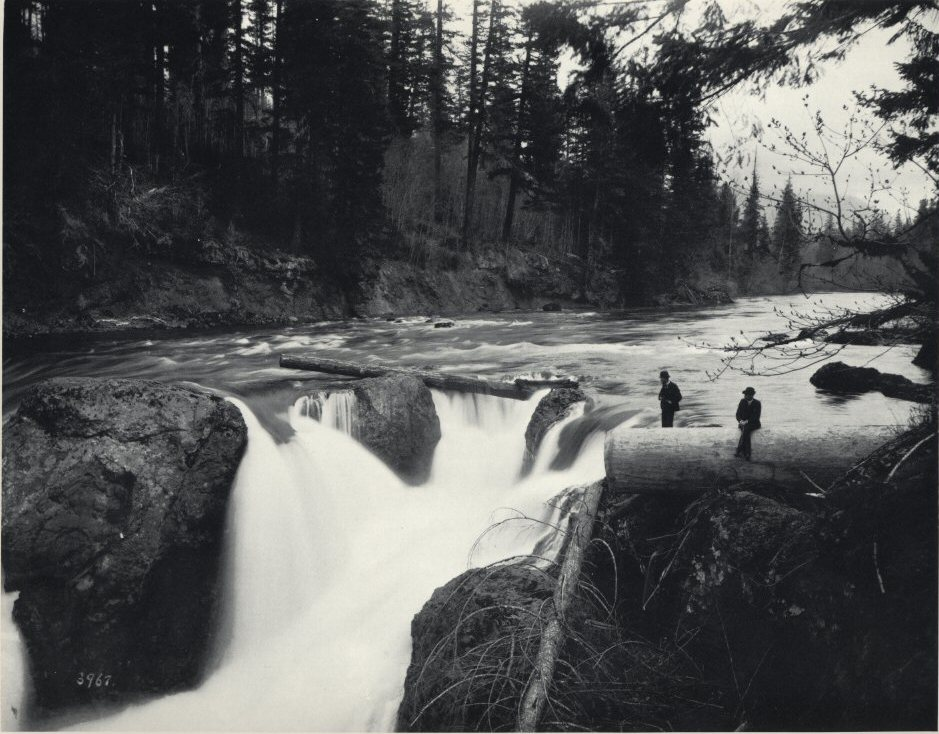
Brink of falls, Spring 1890 - Frank Jay Haynes

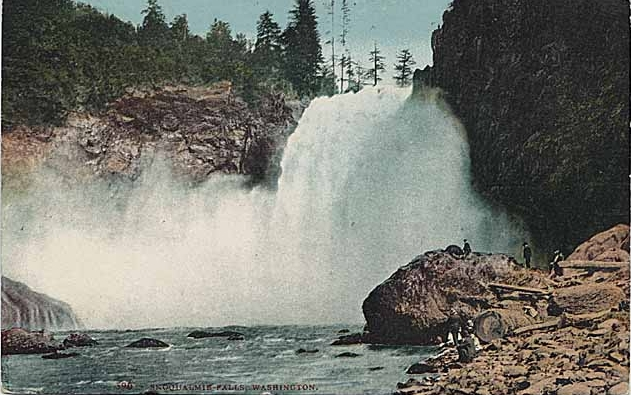
A 1910 hand color photo of Snoqualmie Falls.

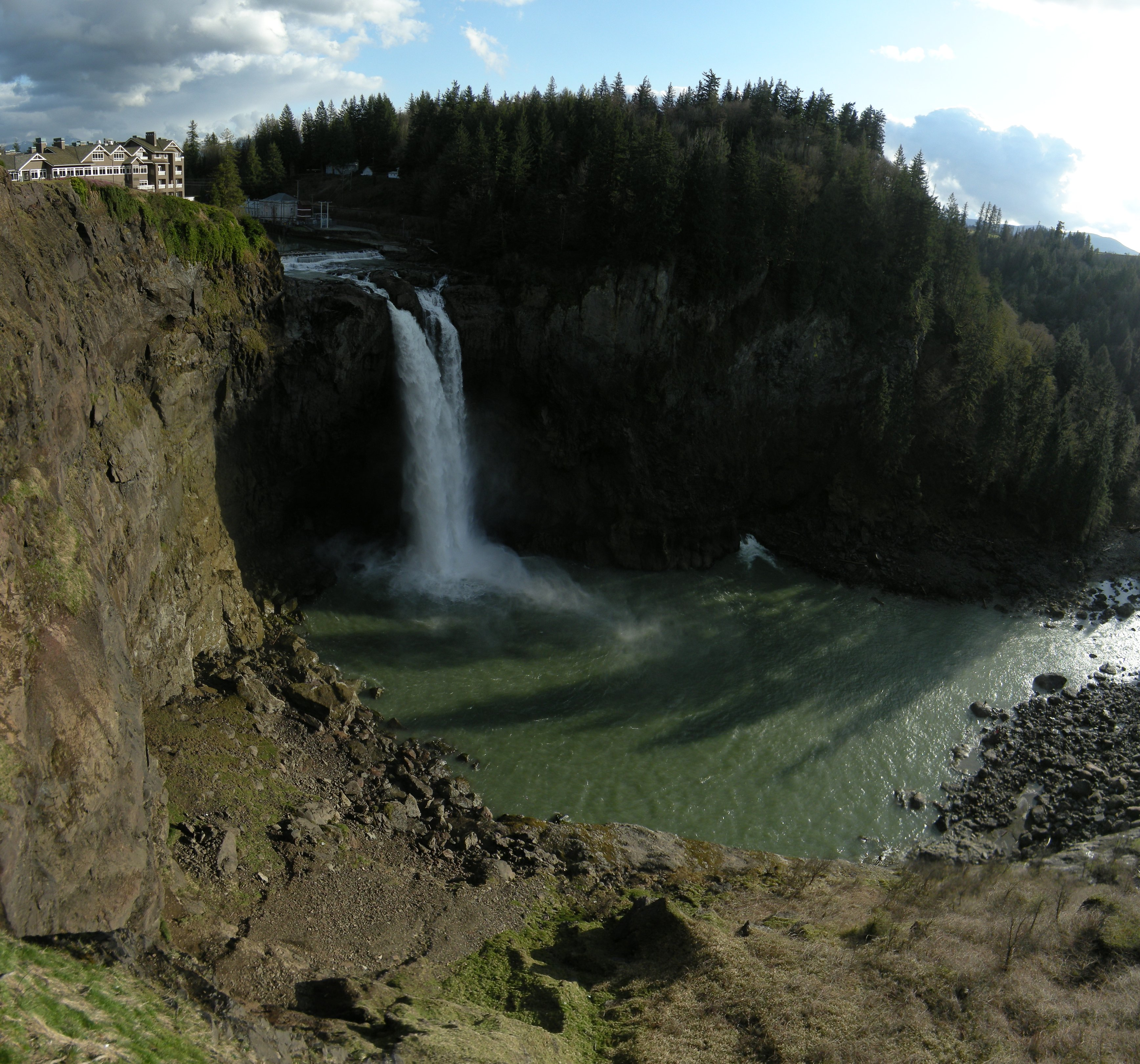
Panoramic view in late March 2009.

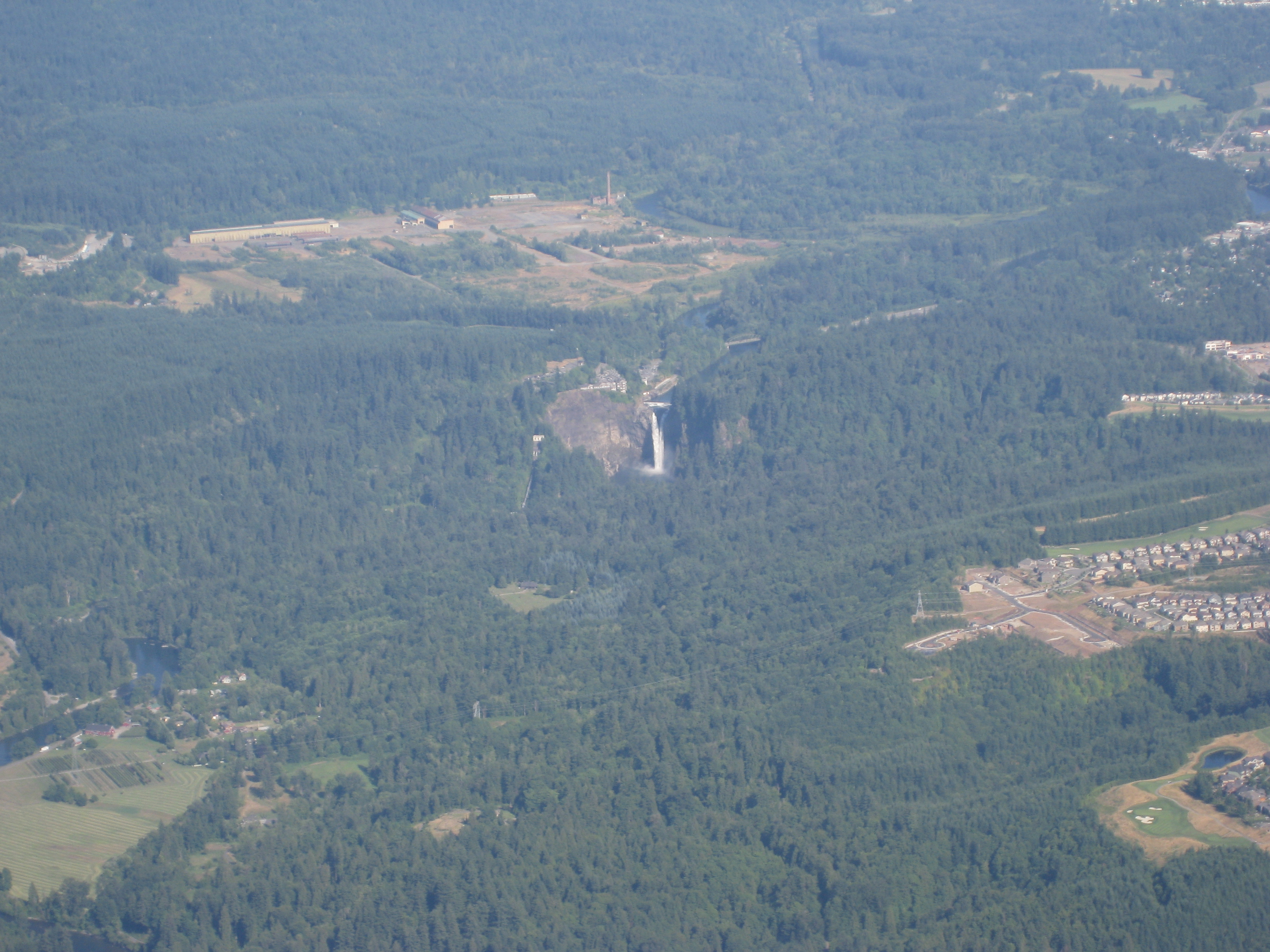
Aerial image of Snoqualmie Falls & surrounding area, 2008

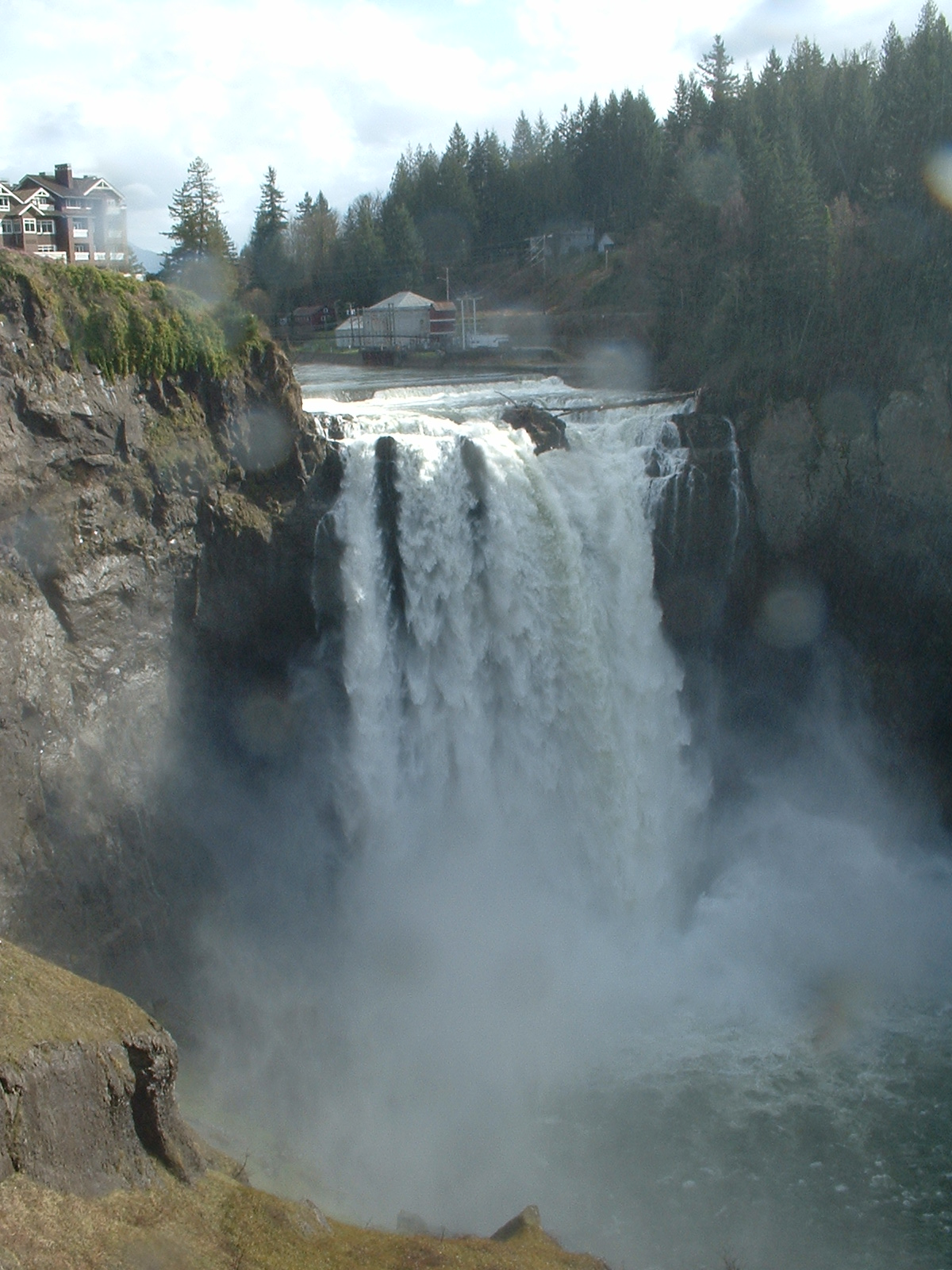
Snoqualmie Falls in mid-March 2003

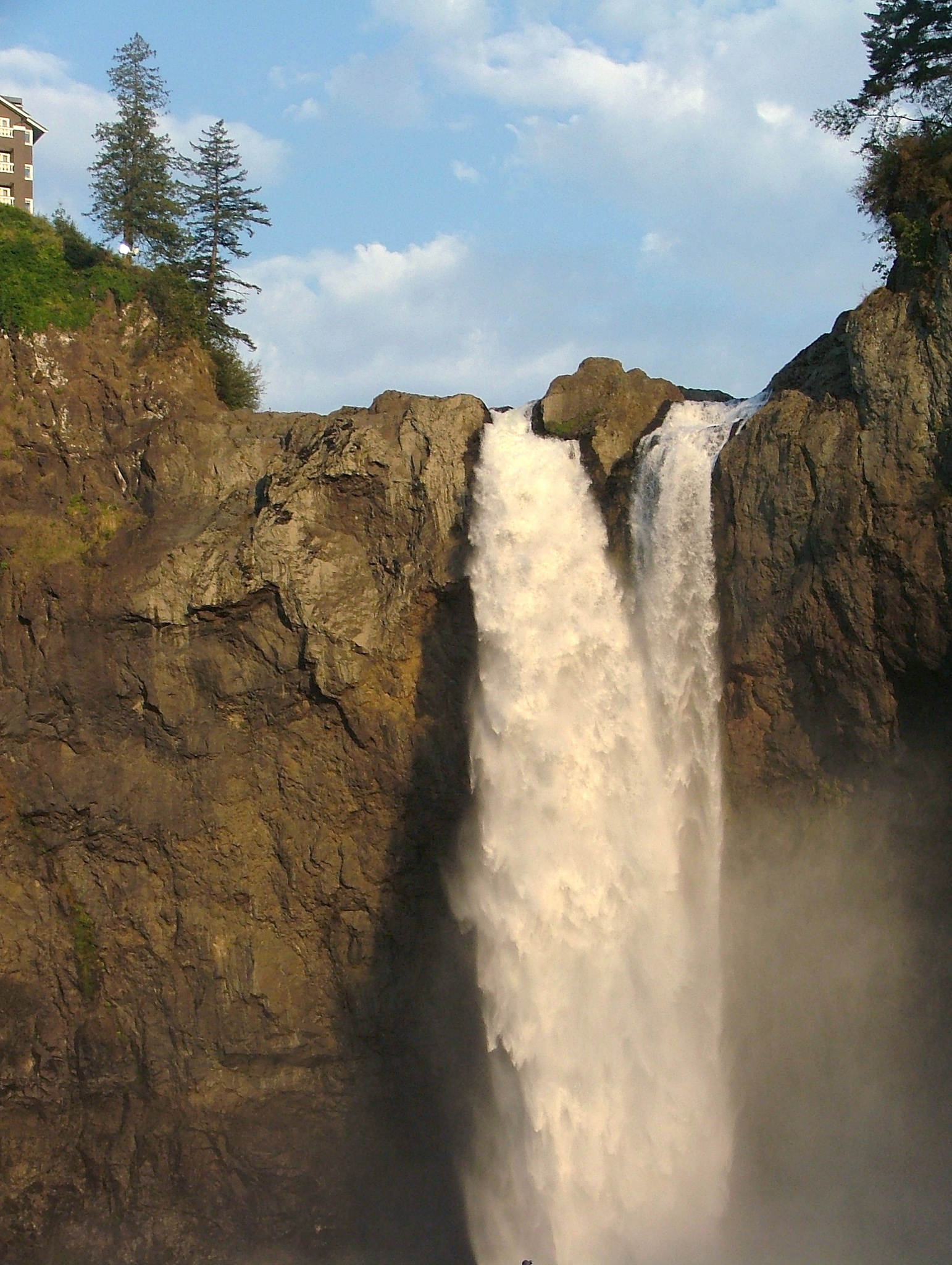
The falls in August 2004

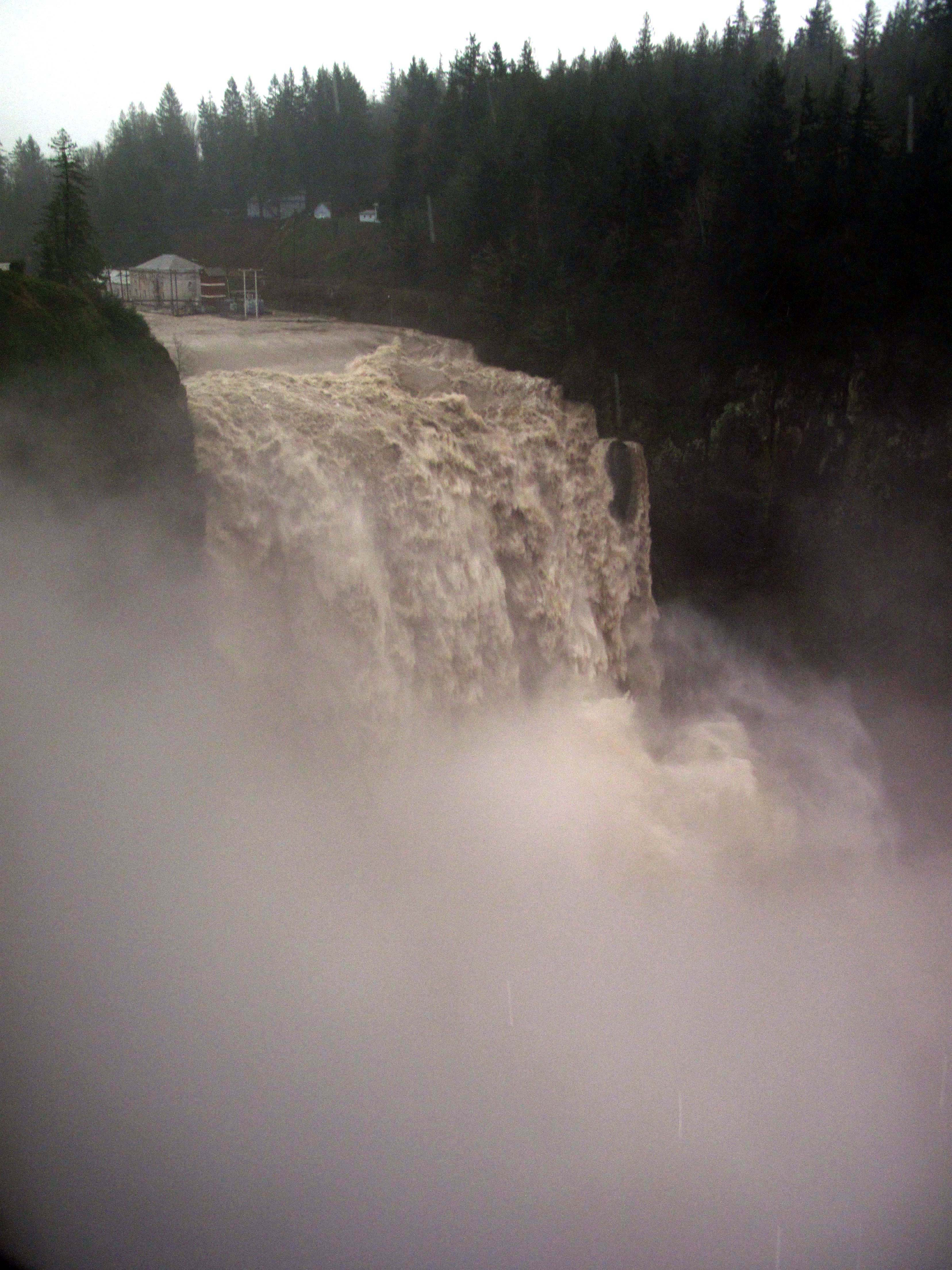
Flood stage flow over Snoqualmie Falls.

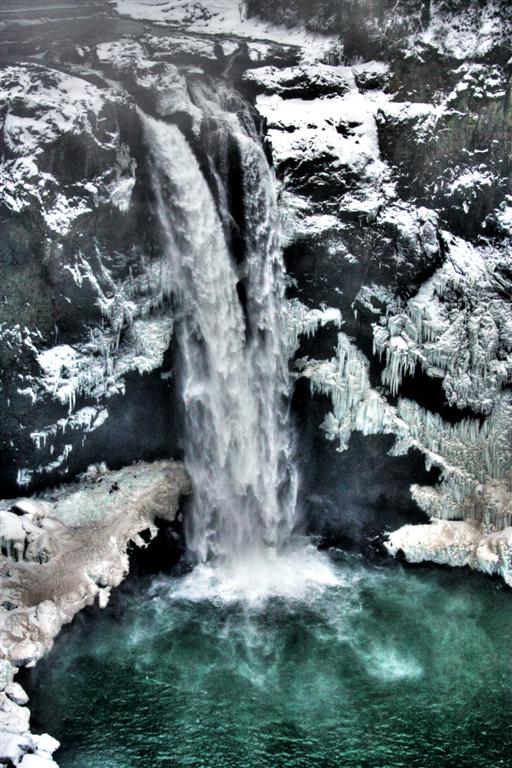
The falls on Christmas 2008.

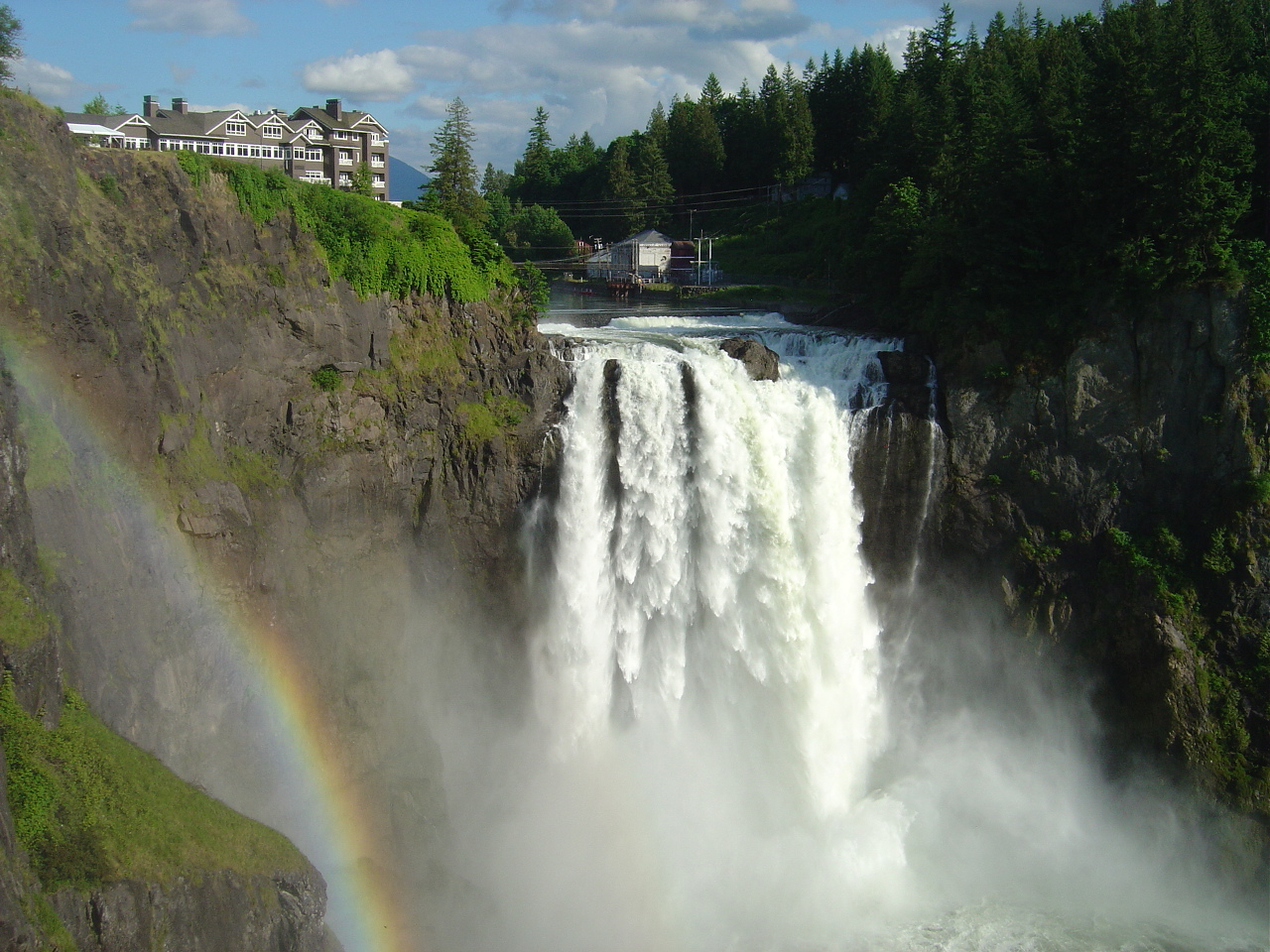
As seen from the pavilion above.

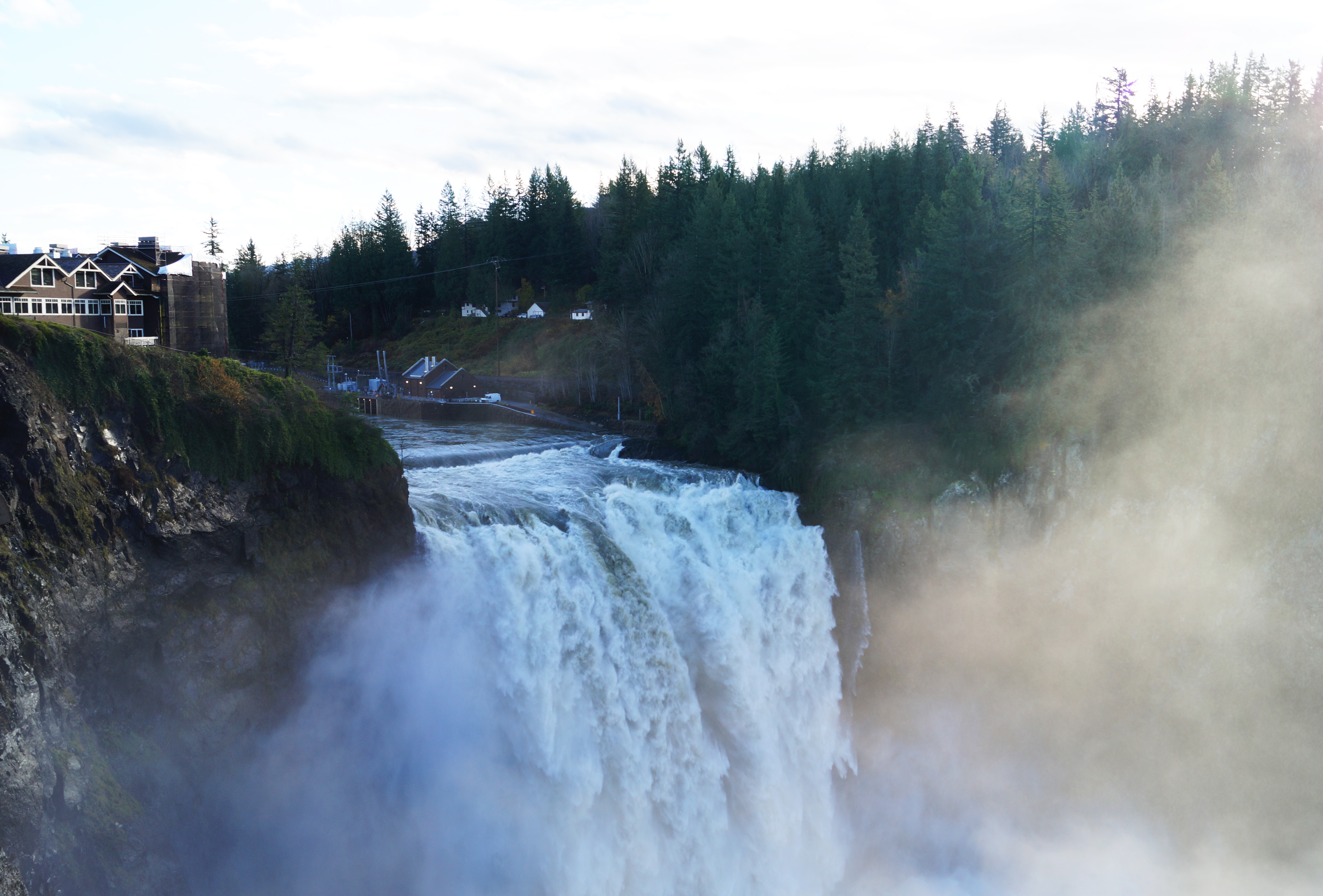
Snoqualmie Falls Washington in November 2017

== See also ==
- List of waterfalls
- Run-of-the-river hydroelectricity
