= Energize Eastside =

Powerline upgrade project in Washington state

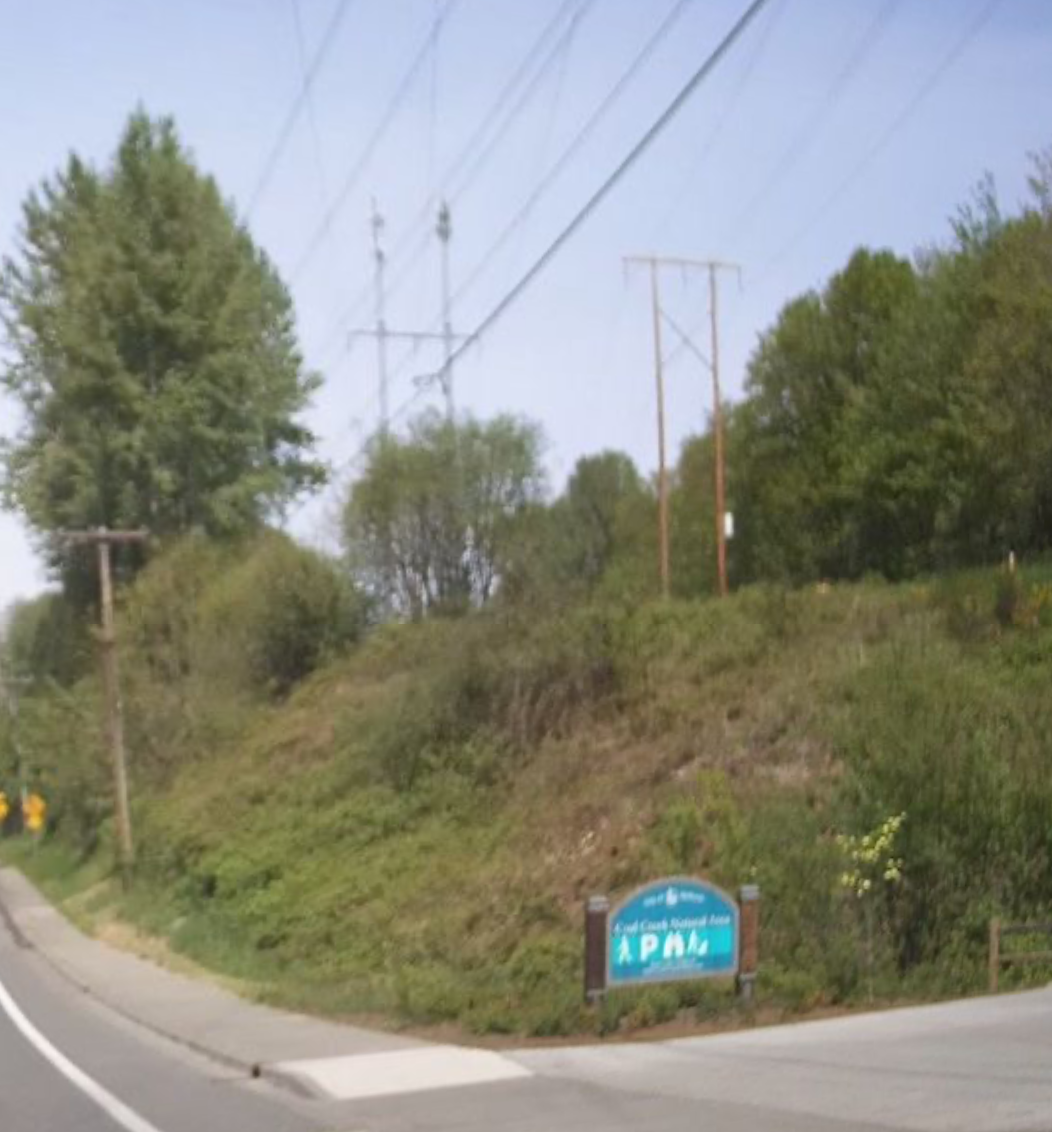
115 kV transmission lines near Coal Creek to be upgraded

Energize Eastside is a Puget Sound Energy (PSE) project to upgrade 16 miles of electric transmission line on the Eastside between Redmond and Renton. The project involves building a new electric substation and upgrading lines from 115 kV to 230 kV along the existing easement. The project has faced significant local opposition over its necessity and impact.

== History ==
The power corridor was originally built in the 1960s, and serves as the backbone of the Eastside's power grid. The route follows the Olympic pipeline. Since then, the Eastside's population has grown significantly. In 2013, PSE announced the need for an upgrade to the Eastside's power grid, citing this population increase.

PSE ultimately selected to upgrade the existing corridor, known as "Willow 1" rather than use a parallel one owned by Seattle City Light or use alternatives such as batteries. The plan includes upgrading the 115 kV lines to 230 kV, and building a new electric substation. The project will be paid for with rate increases.

Construction was planned in phases, beginning at the south end of the line. Construction of the new substation began in 2020. The substation will step down the power from the new 230 kV lines to serve local 115 kV lines. The 230 kV line upgrade began in 2021. The segments in south Bellevue and Renton were completed in 2022. The city of Newcastle approved the project in 2022, and construction began in 2023. The north end of the line is in the permitting phase.

== Controversy ==
The project has encountered significant controversy from the beginning, especially from the Coalition of Eastside Neighborhoods for Sensible Energy (CENSE). The new 230 kV power lines require a larger easement and 20-40 feet taller transmission towers. Opponents of the project argue that PSE has overstated the need for new power lines, using the most generous forecasts of electric demand. In addition, they support the option of battery storage over building new transmission lines. There was also concern that the project was primarily for the benefit of power needs in Canada, and not the Eastside. Ultimately, these claims were unsuccessful. The City of Bellevue approved the project in 2019, and construction began there in 2020.

PSE has responded to these claims by citing several independent studies that power demand will surpass the capacity of the existing lines. They argue that while battery technology is improving, it is not sufficient to address the Eastside's power needs. PSE also claims that the power lines and pipeline can coexist safely.

There is also concern about building higher-voltage lines atop the Olympic Pipeline, especially after the Olympic Pipeline explosion in 1999. CENSE and Citizens for Sane Eastside Energy (CSEE) have opposed this construction. As part of the permitting process, PSE is required to create a specific safety plan with Olympic.

== Route ==
The corridor begins in Renton at the Talbot Hill Substation. It proceeds north across the Cedar River, and through the city of Renton. It passes directly over Renton Technical College. It then passes through the city of Newcastle, to the west of Lake Boren . It then passes into Bellevue, where it passes over Coal Creek and through the Eastgate neighborhood and crosses Interstate 90. It then reaches the new substation. After the substation, the line continues north through Bellevue, east of downtown through the Crossroads neighborhood. After passing over State Route 520 it enters the Bridle Trails neighborhood. It then enters the city of Redmond, passing over Rose Hill Middle school before ending at the Sammamish substation.
