= Snoqualmie Falls Hydroelectric Plant =

Power plant in the United States

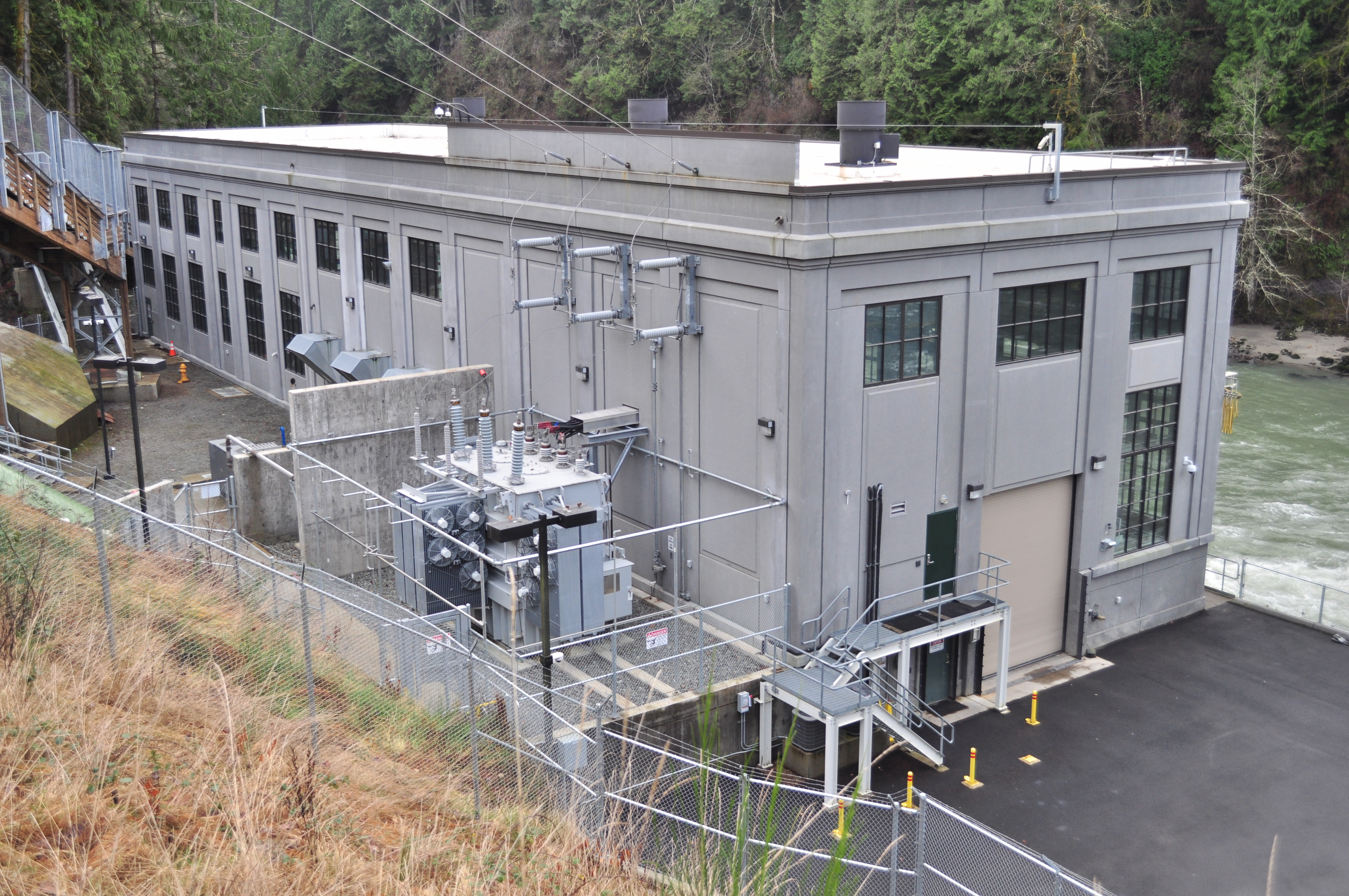
- Plant 2 along the Snoqualmie River
- Country: United States
- Location: Snoqualmie, Washington
- Coordinates: 47°32′39.50″N 121°50′29.27″W
- Status: Operational
- Construction began: Plant 1: 1898; Plant 2: 1956
- Commission date: Plant 1: 1899/1905; Plant 2: 1910; Upgrade: 2013
- Owner: Puget Sound Energy

Power generation
- Units operational: Plant 1: 4 × 1.8 MW Pelton-type, 1 × 6.5 MW Francis-type; Plant 2: 1 × 13.7 MW, 1 × 26.5 MW Francis-type
- Nameplate capacity: Plant 1: 13.7 MW; Plant 2: 40.2 MW; Total: 53.9 MW

External links
- Commons: Related media on Commons
- Snoqualmie Falls Cavity Generating Station
- U.S. National Register of Historic Places
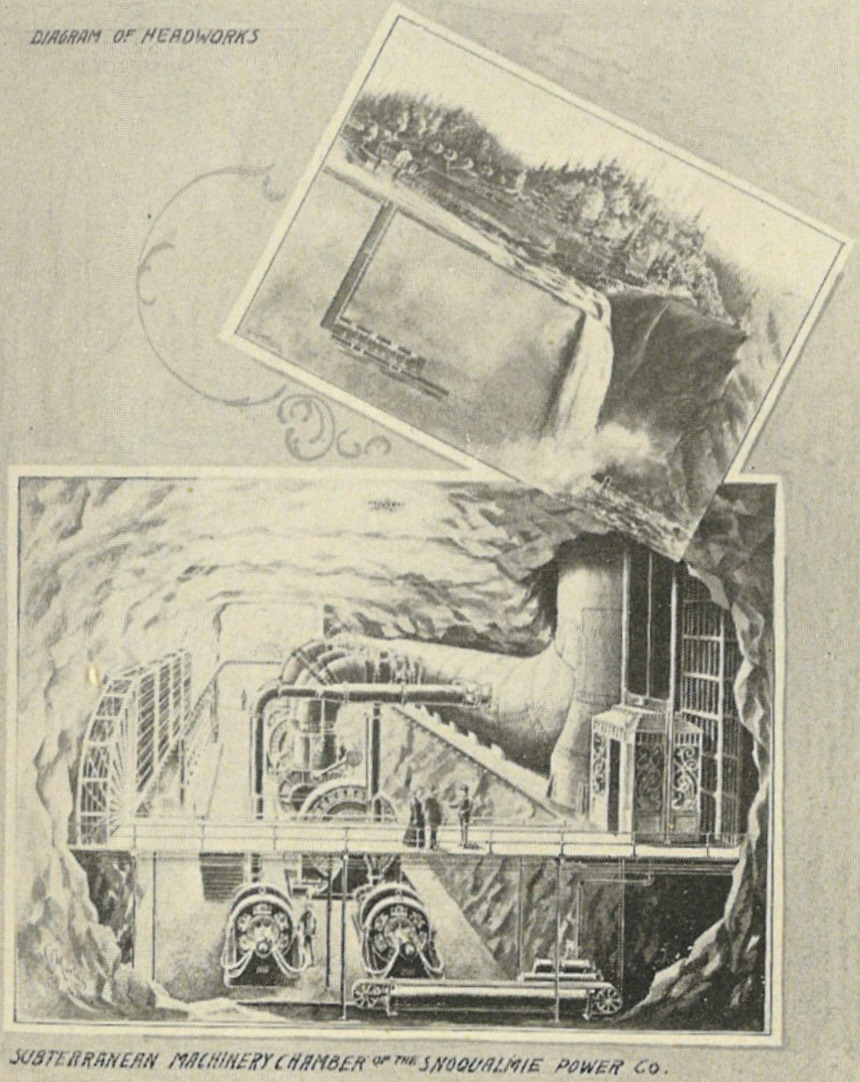
- Cutaway diagrams of the plant
- Location: King County, Washington
- Nearest city: Snoqualmie, Washington
- Built: 1899
- Architect: Charles H. Baker
- NRHP reference No.: 76001895
- Added to NRHP: April 23, 1976

The Snoqualmie Falls Hydroelectric Plant is located just north of Snoqualmie in King County, Washington state, US. It is situated about 22 mi (35 km) east of Seattle. Located just below the Snoqualmie Falls, the power plant consists of two power houses, Plant 1 and Plant 2. Plant 1 was completed in 1899 and is located underground. It is the first completely underground hydroelectric power plant ever built in the world. Plant 2 was built in 1910 and is located along the right bank of the Snoqualmie River. Both plants receive water from a small reservoir created by a weir atop the falls. Plant 1 has an installed capacity of 13.7 MW and Plant 2 a capacity of 40.2 MW for a total installed capacity of 53.9 MW, enough to power 40,000 homes.

Plant 1 was added to the National Register of Historic Places as Snoqualmie Falls Cavity Generating Station on April 23, 1976. In 1981, Plant 1 was also designated as an National Historic Civil Engineering Landmark by the American Society of Civil Engineers. The power plant is owned by Puget Sound Energy. In 1992, Snoqualmie Falls Hydroelectric Power Plant Historic District was added to the National Register of Historic Places.

== History ==
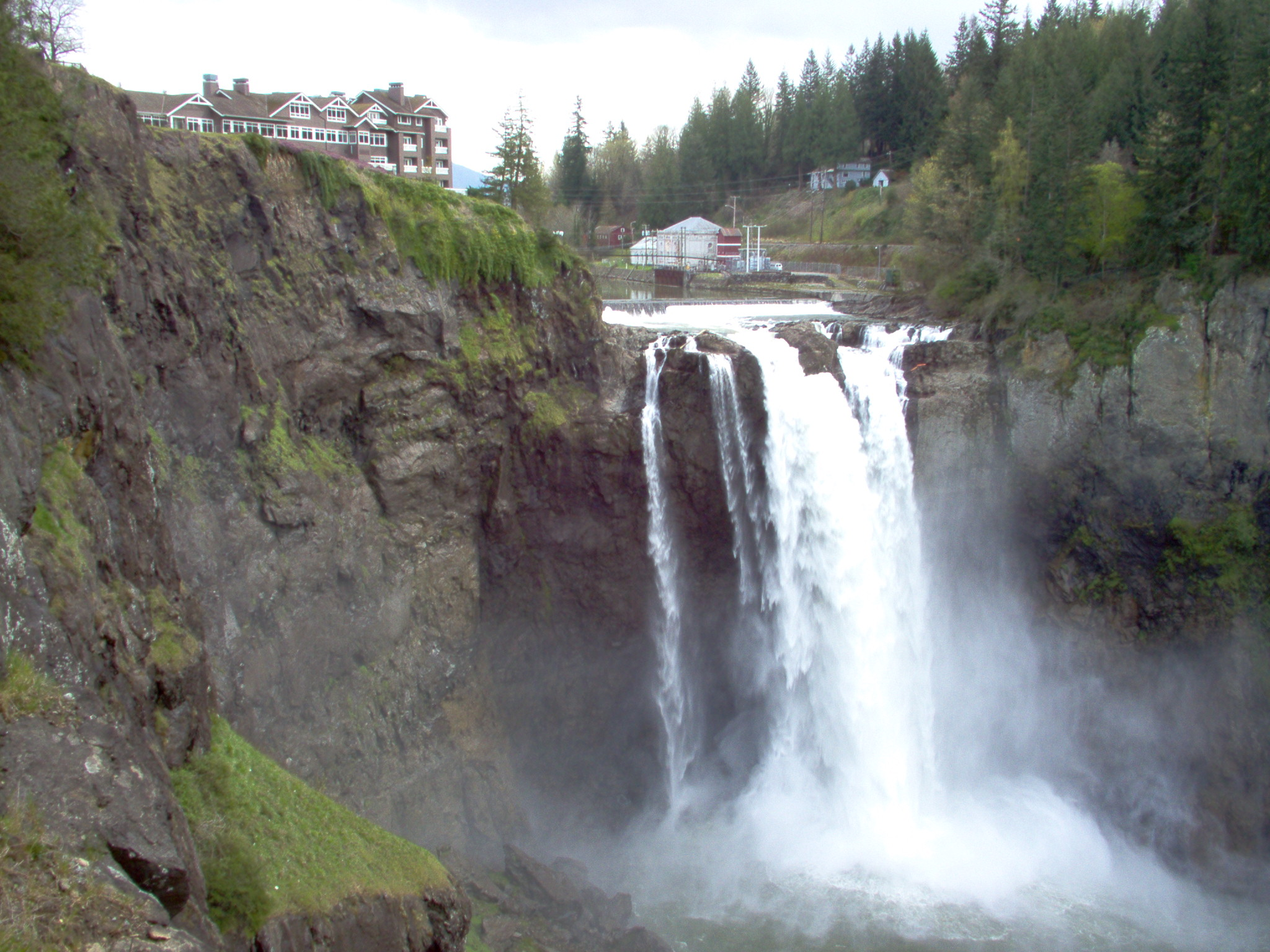
Snoqualmie Falls

The power plant was envisioned by Charles H. Baker in the 1890s. Baker was an engineer for the Seattle, Lake Shore and Eastern Railway and would pass the Snoqualmie Falls routinely during his work. Similar to the Schoellkopf Power Station on Niagara Falls in New York, Baker wanted to exploit the drop in elevation of Snoqualmie Falls for hydroelectric power. After the Panic of 1893 he became unemployed and sought to build the power plant. With funding from his family, to include his father, wealthy businessman William T. Baker, he formed the Snoqualmie Falls Power Company and bought the falls and surrounding land in 1897. Construction on the plant began in 1898. First, a cofferdam was constructed to seal the river from the water intake on the left bank of the Snoqualmie Falls. Steam-powered pneumatic drills were then used to excavate a vertical shaft from the intake to the cavern for Plant 1. A horizontal tunnel was dug as well, which met the vertical shaft at the cavern for Plant 1. A weir was constructed downstream of the intake and just above the falls, to help raise the river above the intake so water could be delivered to the plant. Four Pelton turbines with 1.5 MW Westinghouse generators were initially installed. The first operational generator was online and began to transmit power to Seattle on July 31, 1899. The remainder were commissioned and delivering power to Tacoma as well on November 1, 1899. In 1903 Seattle Electric Company acquired Snoqualmie Falls Power Company. The death of William Baker and financial difficulties that same year ended Charles Baker's stake in the plant. A fifth turbine-generator, horizontal Francis-type, originally rated at 5 MW, was added to Plant 1 in 1905. In 1908 Seattle-Tacoma Power Company, a forerunner to Puget Sound Energy, purchased Seattle Electric Company.

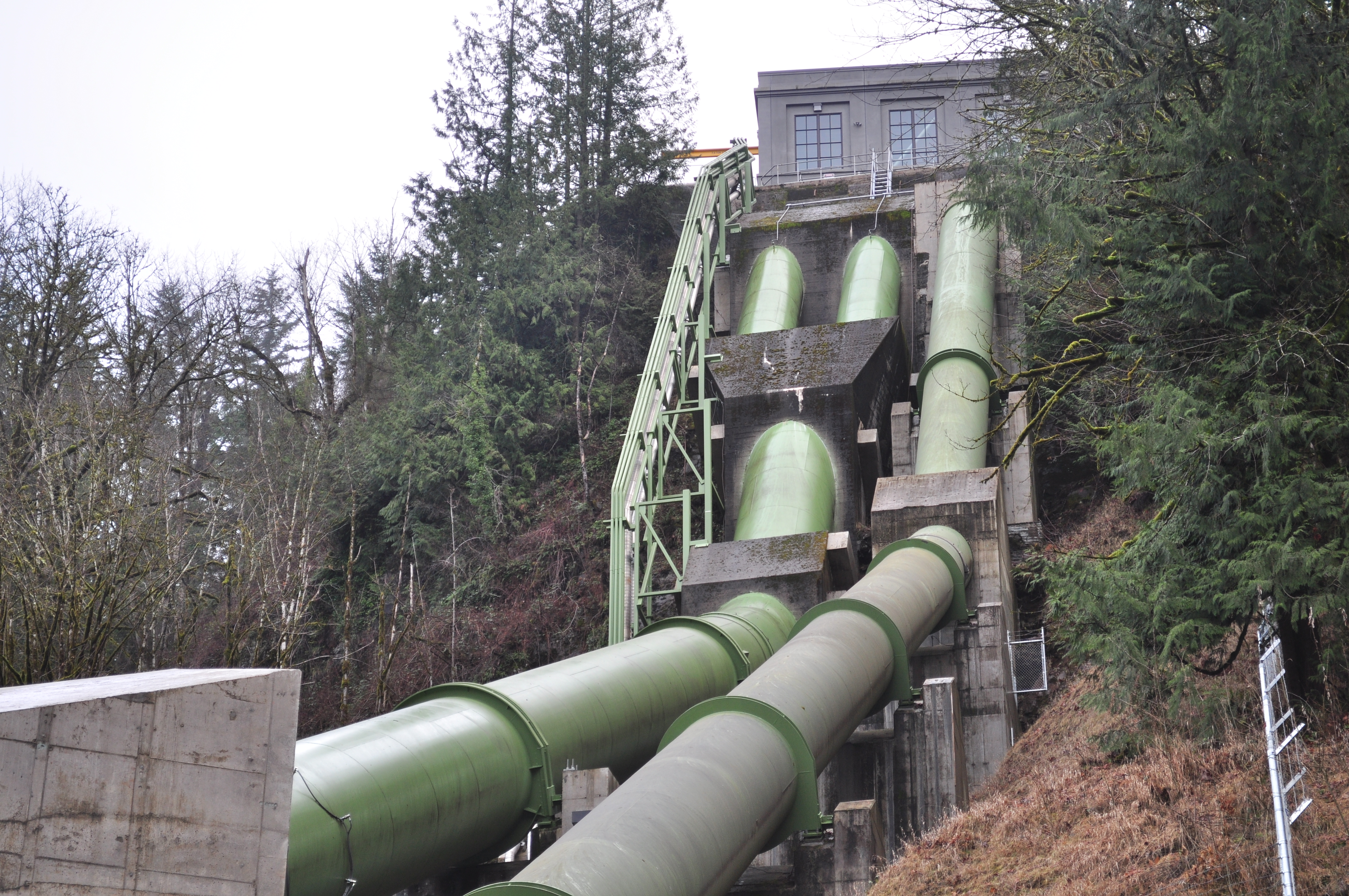
A second penstock was added to Plant 2 in 1957.

The penstock was supplied and installed by Chicago Bridge & Iron Co.

Soon after the fifth generator was added to Plant 1, plans for Plant 2 began. Engineer W.A. Brackenridge studied and designed the plant. It would include a tunnel from the weir connected to a forebay which would supply water to the future Plant 2, located just downstream from the falls. Plant 2 was commissioned in 1910 with a single 9 MW Francis turbine-generator. To make future expansion possible, the tunnel and penstock were built large enough to supply up to three generators. Plant 2 underwent an expansion beginning in 1956. A second Francis turbine-generator was installed and commissioned in 1957. A larger second penstock was also installed as the new generator was much larger than earlier planned. At this time, the entire power plant had an installed capacity of 44.4 MW. The second turbine for Plant 2 was replaced in 1991 due to end-of-life and it was once again replaced in 2004 as it was damaged by sediment. In 2004, Puget Sound Energy was granted a new 40 year license from the Federal Energy Regulatory Commission which required that the plant maintain a consistent discharge equal to or greater than 30 cu ft/s (0.85 m^{3}/s).

=== Rehabilitation and upgrade ===
In April 2010, Puget Sound Energy began a US$200 million project to rehabilitate and upgrade the power plant. The project included retrofitting the first four of the generators in Plant 1 and replacing the fifth. A turbine-generator would be replaced in Plant 2 as well. The weir was lowered to 16 ft (4.9 m) in height, lengthened by 37 ft (11 m) and the water-intake structure was replaced. Lowering the weir will help reduce flood waters upstream of the falls. The penstocks, which feed the power plants with water, were to be upgraded as well. Finally, automatic shut-off and bypass valves were installed for Plant 2. The shut-off valves will better prepare the plant for emergencies and the bypass valves will allow water to flow downstream in the case that Plant 2 is offline. To promote tourism, recreation and culture, several upgrades to include new visitor centers, hiking trails, a boardwalk and improved landscaping were implemented. Renovations on Plant 2 were completed in April 2013. The new 6.5 MW Francis turbine generator in Plant 1 and the entire project was finished in mid-2014. The project raised the installed capacity of the power plant from 44.4 MW to 53.9 MW.

== Design ==
To supply water to Plant 1 and 2, a weir with a height ranging 4–16 ft (1.2–4.9 m) creates a small reservoir. The intake for Plant 1 is located just above the left abutment of the weir. Water from the intake enters a 280 ft (85 m) long and 7 ft (2.1 m) diameter vertical penstock which supplies water to the plant. Plant 1 is located in a cavern 270 ft (82 m) below and about 300 ft (91 m) behind the falls. The cavern is 200 ft (61 m) long, 40 ft (12 m) wide and 30 ft (9.1 m) high. It houses four 1.8 MW Pelton turbine-generators and one 6.5 MW Francis turbine-generator. Water discharged from Plant 1, at a rate of up to 700 cu ft/s (20 m^{3}/s), is returned to the river below the falls via a 650 ft (200 m) long tailrace tunnel.

The intake for Plant 2 is located near the right abutment of the weir. Water first enters a tunnel along a ridge which parallels the river downstream of the falls. It reaches a forebay which temporarily stores water before it is sent to the plant. From the forebay, a gatehouse releases water into two penstocks, each roughly 520 ft (160 m) with the larger having a diameter of 10 ft (3.0 m). The penstocks connect to Plant 2 which is located on the right bank of the Snoqualmie River. It houses a 13.7 MW and a 26.5 MW Francis turbine-generator. Water discharged from Plant 2, at a rate of up 1,800 cu ft/s (51 m^{3}/s), immediately enters the river.
