= Snoqualmie Indian Tribe =

Federally-recognized tribe in Washington

Coordinates: 47°31′09″N 121°50′30″W

sdukʷalbixʷ
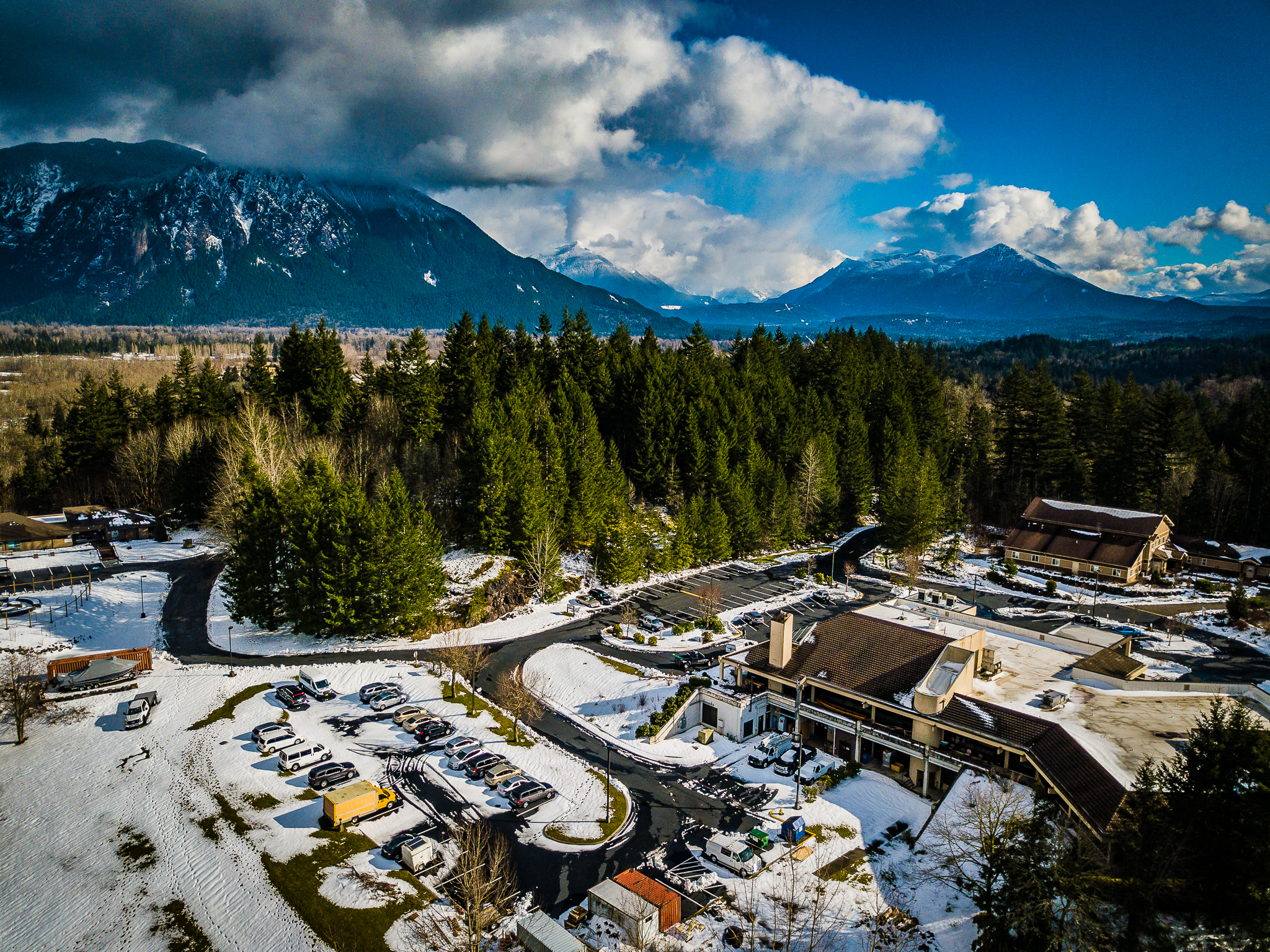
- Snoqualmie Tribal Government Campus, Snoqualmie, Washington

Total population
- approximately 650

Regions with significant populations
- City of Snoqualmie; City of North Bend; Greater Seattle Area (Washington (state)) Washington; United States

Languages
- English, Southern Lushootseed

Religion
- Christianity, traditional tribal religion

Related ethnic groups
- other Snoqualmie people

Location of the Snoqualmie Indian Reservation

The Snoqualmie Indian Tribe (Lushootseed: sdukʷalbixʷ) is a federally recognized tribe of Snoqualmie people. They are Coast Salish Native American peoples from the Snoqualmie Valley in east King and Snohomish Counties in Washington state. Other names for the Snoqualmies include Snoqualmu, Snoqualmoo, Snoqualmick, Snoqualamuke, and Snuqualmi.

== History ==
Some Snoqualmies settled onto the Tulalip Reservation after signing the Point Elliott Treaty with the Washington Territory in 1855, but many remained in their ancestral homelands around the Snoqualmie Valley and Lake Sammamish. At that time they were one of the largest tribes in the Puget Sound region numbering around 4,000. In 1937 the Federal Government proposed granting a reservation though in the end the land was never given. The tribe lost federal recognition in 1953. In October 1999, the Bureau of Indian Affairs once again granted recognition to the Snoqualmie.

They purchased land for and were granted a reservation near Snoqualmie, Washington, on which the tribe opened the Snoqualmie Casino in 2008. They have tried and failed on several occasions to secure a reservation on their ancestral lands along the Tolt River (a tributary of the Snoqualmie River) until the Snoqualmie Tribe Ancestral Forest was purchased by the tribe at the end of 2021. The 12,000-acre ancestral forestlands (4,900 ha) in East King County holds environmental, economic, and historic value to the tribe. The land, most recently used for industrial timber, will be sustainably harvested while the ecosystem is managed to support the native plant and wildlife populations.

== Government ==
The Snoqualmie Tribe is governed by a Tribal constitution and an elected Council. The Tribe's governing structure includes building codes, health codes and other standard governmental functions.
