= Puget Sound Energy =

Energy utility in the U.S. state of Washington

Puget Sound Energy, Inc.
- Company type: Private
- Industry: Energy, utility
- Founded: 1997; 29 years ago, in Seattle, Washington, U.S.
- Headquarters: Bellevue, Washington, U.S.
- Key people: Mary E. Kipp (president and CEO)
- Products: Electricity and natural gas
- Revenue: ▲$4.86 billion (2024)
- Owner: AIMCo, BCI, OMERS, and PGGM
- Number of employees: ▼3,257 (2024)
- Website: www.pse.com

Puget Sound Energy, Inc. (PSE) is an energy utility company based in the U.S. state of Washington that provides electrical power and natural gas to the Puget Sound region. The utility serves electricity to more than 1.24 million customers in Island, King, Kitsap, Kittitas, Pierce, Skagit, Thurston, and Whatcom counties, and provides natural gas to 881,000 customers in King, Kittitas, Lewis, Pierce, Snohomish and Thurston counties. The company's electric and natural gas service area spans 6,000 square miles (16,000 km^{2}).

== Facilities ==
As of December 31, 2024, PSE's electric supplies include utility-owned resources as well as those under long-term contract, for a total capacity of approx. 6,524 megawatts (MW), of which 3,339 is PSE-owned generating capacity.

As of 2023, PSE's generation was 30% hydroelectric, 30% natural gas, 22% wind, and 18% coal derived. Less than one percent originated from other energy efficiency programs.

PSE's partial ownership of Eastern Montana's Colstrip Generating Station represents the single largest power-generating facility PSE owns, approximately 700 MW of generating capacity. In 2010, the Colstrip Generating station was the 8th largest greenhouse gas emitter among power plants in the United States. In 2019, the Washington Clean Energy Transformation Act mandated that all power utilities remove coal from their generation mix, including "coal by wire" from out of state. As of May 2024, PSE has proactively removed coal from its portfolio by choosing not to purchase energy generated from the Colstrip plant. It intends to sell its 25% stake in the Colstrip plant, but plans to do so have repeatedly fallen through.

Hydroelectricity generated 31% of PSE's power supply in 2016. The company operates three hydroelectric facilities:

- The Baker River Hydroelectric Project on the Baker River, generating 170 MW of electricity.
- Snoqualmie Falls Hydroelectric Plant, two power plants on the Snoqualmie River in King County, generating 44 MW.
- The Electron Hydroelectric Project on the Puyallup River in Pierce County generates 22 MW of electricity.

Natural gas-fired power generation accounted for 22% of the utility's electricity fuel mix in 2016. The company operates these natural gas-fired facilities:

- The Sumas Generating Station in Whatcom County is a combined-cycle natural gas-fired plant capable of generating 125 MW of electricity.
- The Ferndale Generating Station in Whatcom County is a combined-cycle natural gas-fired plant capable of generating 270 MW of electricity.
- The Encogen Generating Station in Whatcom County is a combined-cycle natural gas-fired plant capable of generating 167 MW of electricity.
- The Goldendale Generating Station in Klickitat County is a combined-cycle natural gas-fired plant capable of generating 277 MW of electricity.
- The Mint Farm Generating Station in Cowlitz County is a combined-cycle natural-gas-fired plant capable of generating 310 MW of electricity.
- The Fredonia Generating Station in Skagit County is a simple-cycle natural gas-fired plant capable of generating 316 MW of electricity.
- The Frederickson Generating Station in Pierce County is a simple-cycle natural gas-fired plant capable of generating 147 MW of electricity.
- The Frederickson 1 Generating Station in Pierce County is a combined-cycle natural gas-fired plant capable of generating 275 MW of electricity. PSE owns a 50% share, or 137 MW.
- The Whitehorn Generating Station in Whatcom County is a simple-cycle natural gas-fired plant capable of generating 147 MW of electricity.

Wind power and other generation sources, such as biomass and landfill gas, account for 1% of the utility's electricity fuel mix. PSE owns and operates these wind-power facilities:

- The Hopkins Ridge Wind Facility in southeast Washington's Columbia County began commercial production in 2005. Hopkins Ridge's 87 wind turbines have the capacity to generate 157 MW of electricity.
- The Wild Horse Wind and Solar Facility in central Washington's Kittitas County began production in 2006 and was expanded to include 22 turbines in 2009. Wild Horse's 149 wind turbines have the capacity to generate 273 MW of electricity.
- In 2012, the first phase of the Lower Snake River Wind Project began in Southeast Washington's Garfield County. Lower Snaker River Phase 1's 149 turbines have the capacity to generate 343 MW of electricity.

Coal-fired power is a major contributor to PSe's fuel mix at 36% of PSE's 2018 electricity generation sources, the largest share in 2018. The company owns a stake of the Colstrip Unit 3 coal power plant in eastern Montana.

A net metering program allows residential and business customers to return extra renewable energy solar power to the grid. An additional approximately 1% per year of generation comes from—or actually is reduced by—state mandated I-937 energy efficiency programs, adding an average 25 additional "Negawatts" generation capacity per year.

For its natural gas service to customers, PSE purchases a portfolio of natural gas supplies originating in western Canada and the U.S. Rocky Mountain states.

== History ==
PSE was formed in 1997 when two of its largest ancestral companies – Puget Sound Power & Light Company and Washington Energy Company – merged. Puget Sound Power and Light was itself preceded by several companies that were founded in the 1870s and 1880s and built the region's first hydroelectric plant at Snoqualmie Falls in 1898. Puget Sound Power had attempted a merger with Washington Water Power in 1952, but it was blocked by a superior court judge.

In October 2007, the company announced that it would be sold to foreign investors led by Macquarie Group, an Australian funds manager, and three Canadian pension funds. Groups in three northwestern counties—Island, Jefferson, and Skagit—filed ballot measures for the November 2008 election to establish public utility districts in response to the planned buyout. The measure was approved in Jefferson County, which formed a public utility district in 2013 and paid PSE $103 million for its assets in the county.

The sale to Macquarie and the pension funds, conducted through a leveraged private equity buyout, was approved in 2009. Puget Holdings, the U.S. title of this group of long-term infrastructure investors, merged with Puget Energy, PSE's parent company to form the current business structure. Puget Energy is a holding company incorporated in the State of Washington. All of its operations are conducted through its utility subsidiary, PSE, which is regulated by Washington Utilities and Transportation Commission.

In 2018, Macquarie sold its ownership stake in PSE. PSE's current owners are Alberta Investment Management Corporation, British Columbia Investment Management Corporation, OMERS, and PGGM.

The PSE began construction on the controversial Energize Eastside power line project in 2020.

=== Clean Energy Transformation Act ===
In 2019, Governor Jay Inslee signed the Clean Energy Transformation Act into law, requiring that all utilities phase out coal power by 2025, be carbon neutral by 2030 and be carbon free by 2045. All investor owned utilities, including PSE, are required to create a Clean Energy Implementation Plan (CEIP) every four years starting in 2022. In PSE's first CEIP, they set a goal to achieve 63% renewable energy by 2025.

== Rates and emissions ==
Puget Sound Energy rates show a typical residential electrical bill (at 1000 kWh per month) of $102.56 and typical a gas bill (at 68 therms per month) of $86. In 2018, PSE reported total carbon-dioxide-equivalent emissions of 10,512,364 metric tons due to electricity operations and 4,989,403 metric tons due to natural gas operations, which equate to 9 and 6 metric tons per customer respectively. PSE figures emissions of 0.169 metric tons per user according to EPA GHG MRR Subpart DD.
