= Baker Dam =

Baker Dam may refer to:

- Lower Baker Dam, in Skagit County, Washington state, constructed in 1926
- Upper Baker Dam, completed in 1959 and forming a reservoir called Baker Lake
- Several proposed dams across the Baker River (Chile) in Patagonia within the HidroAysén project
