= Sherman Crater =

Active volcanic crater of Mount Baker in Washington

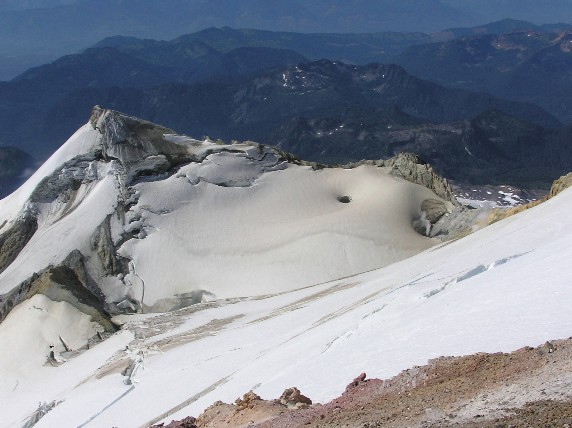
- View south into Sherman Crater from Grant Peak in 2004. Sherman Peak at left; fumaroles of west rim at right.

Highest point
- Elevation: 9,465 ft (2,885 m)
- Coordinates: 48°46′09″N 121°48′53″W

Geography
- Location within Washington (state)
- Location: Whatcom County, Washington, U.S.
- Parent range: Cascade Range
- Topo map: USGS Mount Baker

Geology
- Volcanic arc: Cascade Volcanic Arc
- Last eruption: September 7 to November 27, 1880

Sherman Crater is an active volcanic crater of Mount Baker in the U.S. state of Washington situated between Sherman Peak and Grant Peak.

== Historical eruptions ==
During recorded history, eruptions at Mount Baker have mainly occurred from Sherman Crater. The earliest historical eruption took place in 1843, with more recent eruptions having occurred in 1852–1853, 1854, 1858, 1859–1860, 1863, 1870 and 1880. These eruptions ranked 2 and 3 on the Volcanic Explosivity Index. Possible but unconfirmed eruptions may have also occurred in 1850, 1856, 1860, 1865, 1867, 1869 and 1884.

== 1975 activity ==
In March 1975, local observers noted a dark column rising from Sherman Crater that sharply contrasted with previous white steam emissions. Over the next year several ashy plumes resulted in the formation of several small near-vent lahars. In addition scientists measured a ten-fold increase in thermal activity and detected magmatic gases, increasing concern that an eruption could occur. This was the first hint of volcanic activity in the Cascade Range since the 1914–1917 eruption of Lassen Peak in northern California. By the fall of 1975, melting of Sherman Crater glacier resulted in a snow-free area three times larger than typical summer exposure and revealed a shallow crater lake and previously unknown fumaroles.

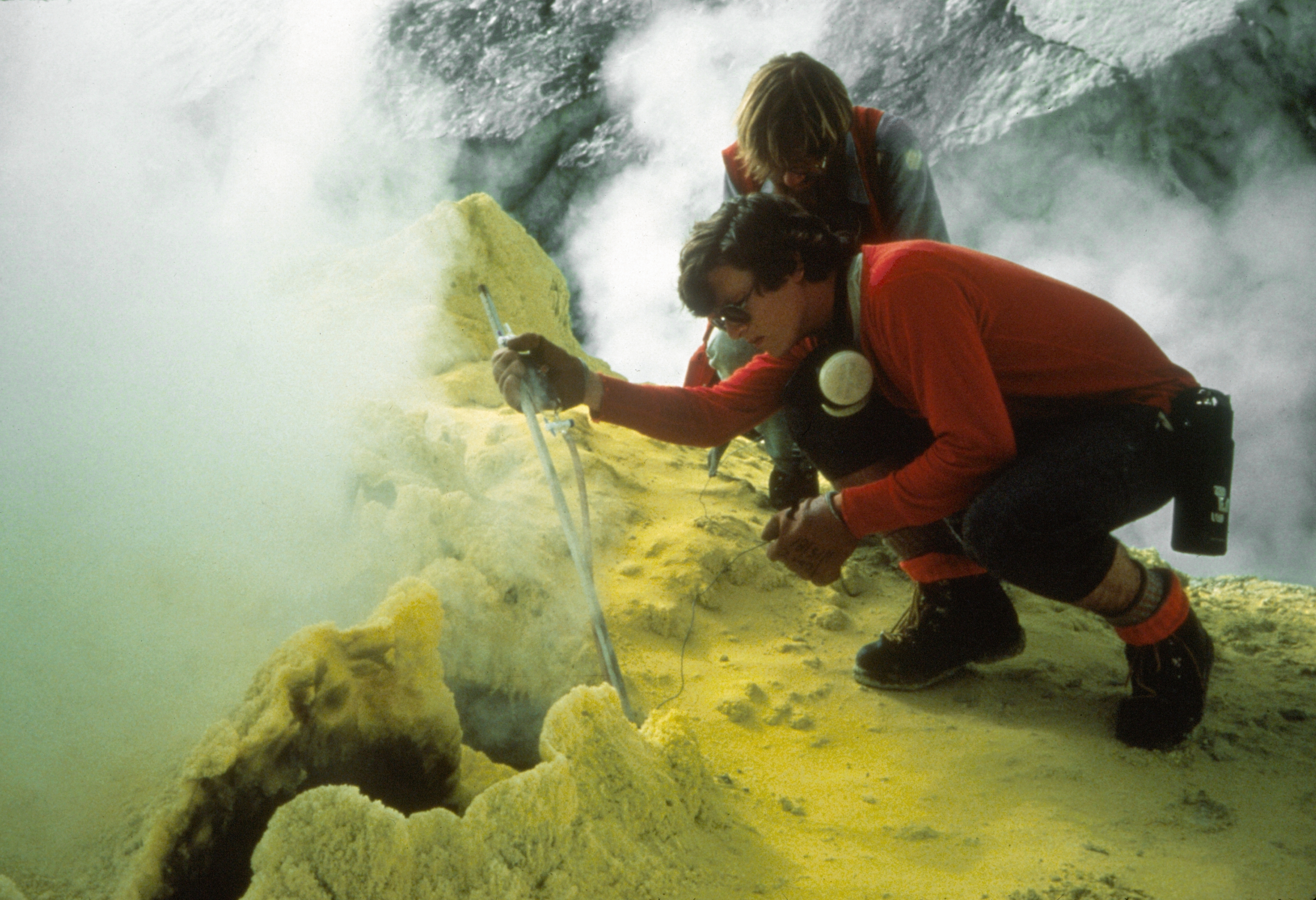
Sampling fumarole gas at Sherman Crater in 1981

A major concern was that an eruption might cause the walls of Sherman Crater to collapse, sending lahars into Baker Lake reservoir and causing a wave to overtop, or significantly damage, the Upper Baker Dam. Either event would result in a large volume of water rushing into the Lake Shannon reservoir and potentially cause a surge of water over, or failure of, the Lower Baker Dam. Failure of the Lower Baker Dam would result in catastrophic flooding down the Skagit River with little to no warning. This was an especially worrying scenario for the town of Concrete, which lies at the foot of the Lower Baker Dam.

As a result of the activity and hazard concerns, all potential monitoring tools available at the time were employed and the Baker Lake reservoir was lowered to accommodate possible lahars. This was the first extensive and modern monitoring campaign at a Cascade volcano. Monitoring techniques included installation of a seismic network, tilt monitoring, temperature measurements, fumarole and airborne gas sampling, crater meltwater analysis and gravity measurements.

As time passed, no clear signs of rising magma, significant changes in gas composition or emission rates or surface deformation appeared. The activity gradually declined over the following two years but the amount of heat escaping from the ground stabilized at a higher level than before 1975. Field observations and onsite monitoring occurred sporadically in the 1990s and more regularly in the 2000s, which provided for a relatively long-term data set regarding the behavior of Mount Baker. The data collected suggests that magma may have intruded beneath the volcano in 1975, but it did not have enough energy to erupt. The magma stalled, likely in the form of a dike, and has been cooling since. The shallow magma heated the overlying hydrothermal system, which caused the observed increases in heat and gas emissions as well as providing energy for the steam explosions.
