= Thunder Glacier =

Thunder Glacier may refer to:

- Thunder Glacier (Antarctica)
- Thunder Glacier (Mount Baker), on Mount Baker, Washington, USA
- Thunder Glacier (Skagit County, Washington), in North Cascades National Park, Washington, USA
- Thunder Glacier (New Zealand)
