= Boulder Creek (Baker Lake tributary) =

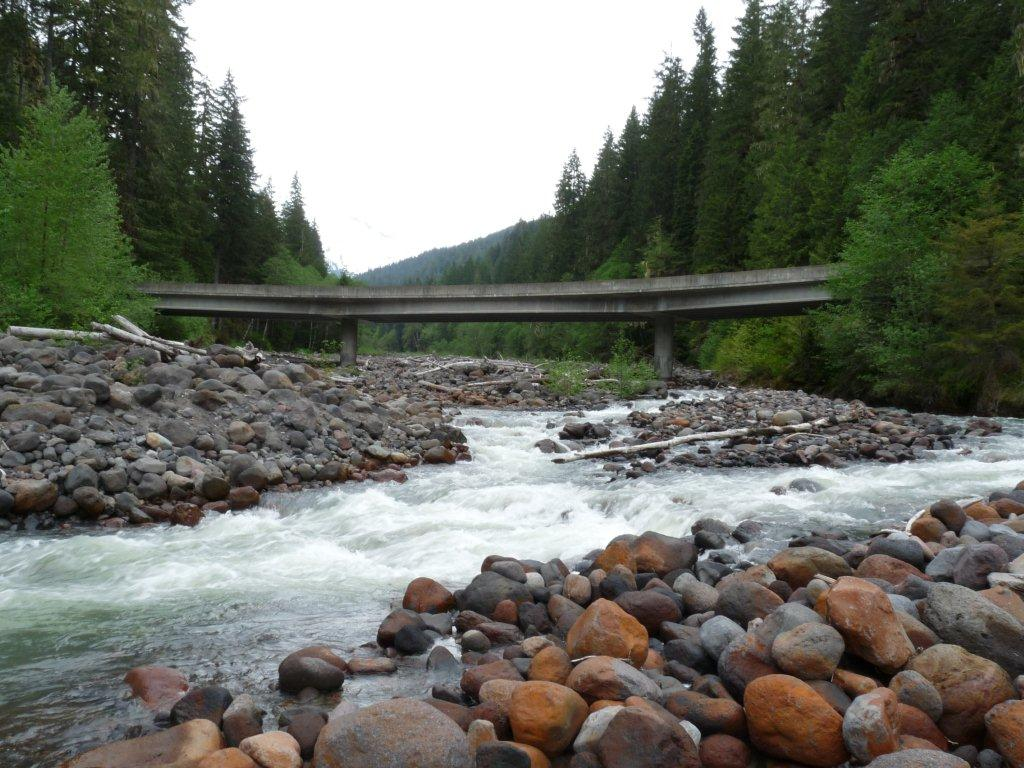
- Boulder Creek at NF-11

Location
- Country: United States
- State: Washington
- County: Whatcom

Physical characteristics
- Source: Mount Baker
  - coordinates: 48°45′44.4344″N 121°45′51.5185″W
- Mouth: Baker Lake
  - coordinates: 48°42′44.4348″N 121°39′23.5048″W
- Length: 6.5 miles (10.5 km)
- Basin size: 10.7 square miles (28 km^{2})

Boulder Creek is a tributary of Baker Lake that runs off the southeast slope of Mount Baker, consisting of meltwater mainly from Boulder Glacier.

Boulder Creek was named by Joseph Morovitz, a local homesteader, for the large boulders in the creek where his trail crossed the creek.

== Hydrology ==
Due to meltwater coming from Sherman Crater, the creek tends to be high in acids and heavy metals during periods of higher volcanism.

== Geology ==
In the early Holocene, eruptions of Mount Baker filled the Boulder Creek valley with lahars and pyroclastic flows, which were later eroded by Boulder Creek. The remnants of these flows are called the Boulder Creek assemblage. The assemblage forms a fan near the end of the creek, which is now partially covered by Baker Lake. A large embankment, about 1.5 kilometres (0.93 mi) upstream from where NF-11 (Baker Lake Road) crosses the creek, shows record of 11 pyroclastic flows and 16 lahars. Another 1.5 kilometres (0.93 mi) upstream, a 10–15-metre (33–49 ft) andesite lava flow is interbedded with the assemblage. The location of the flows suggest that the eruptions occurred from Sherman Crater, possibly during the period that created the crater.
