= Koma Kulshan Project =

Koma Kulshan Hydroelectric Project
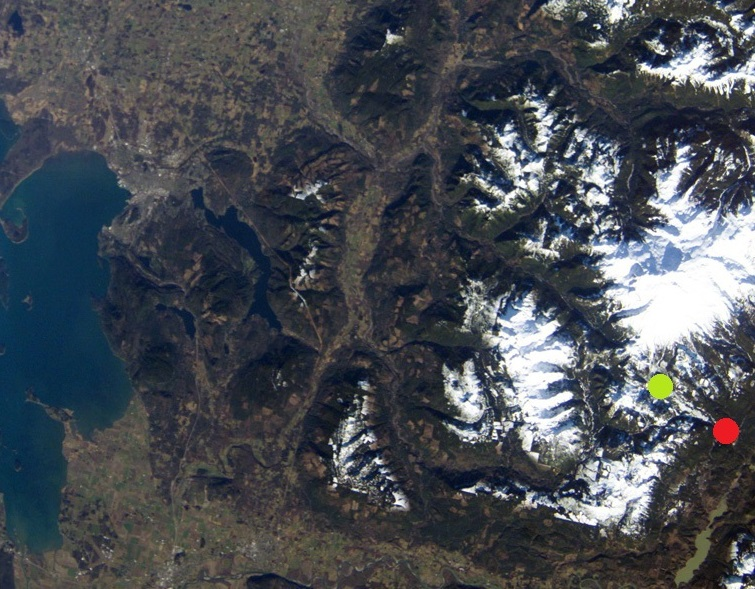
- Image of project on Mount Baker as seen from space: red dot is powerhouse, green dot is dam(s). Bellingham on the upper left side of frame, Lake Shannon on lower right.

- Location within Washington (state)
- Official name: Koma Kulshan Hydroelectric Project (P-3239)
- Country: United States
- Location: Mount Baker National Forest in Whatcom County, Washington
- Coordinates: 48.6802°N 121.7233°W
- Purpose: Hydroelectricity
- Status: Operational
- Construction began: 1989
- Opening date: October 1990
- Owner: Koma Kulshan Associates (Subsidiary of Eagle Creek Renewable Energy)
- Operator: Eagle Creek Renewable Energy

Dam and spillways
- Impounds: Sulphur Creek, Rocky Creek
- Height: Rocky Creek Dam: 32 feet (9.8 m); Sulphur Creek Dam: 37 feet (11 m)
- Length: Rocky Creek Dam: 18 feet (5.5 m); Sulphur Creek Dam: 15 feet (4.6 m)

Koma Kulshan Powerhouse
- Coordinates: 48.6802°N 121.7233°W
- Commission date: 1990
- Type: Run-of-the-river
- Hydraulic head: c. 1,600 ft (490 m)
- Turbines: 1x 12 MW Sulzer Escher Wyss Pelton wheel
- Installed capacity: 12 MW
- Annual generation: 24.764 GWh

The Koma Kulshan Project is a 12 MW run-of-the-river hydroelectric generation facility on the slopes of Mount Baker, a stratovolcano in Washington state's North Cascades. The project commenced commercial operation in October 1990, and is owned by Eagle Creek Renewable Energy via their Koma Kulshan Associates subsidiary. It supplies Puget Sound Energy via a Power Supply Agreement (PSA) contract. Its single turbine is a Pelton wheel supplied by Sulzer Escher Wyss.

Located in the Mount Baker National Forest, it is one of six Federal Energy Regulatory Commission (FERC)-licensed small hydro installations on Federal Government land in Washington state.

Koma Kulshan is the name of Mount Baker in the Lummi dialect.

In 2022, the project was sold to Eagle Creek Renewable Energy, LLC.

== Dams ==
Intakes are located at diversion dams on the Rocky Creek and Sulphur Creek tributaries of Lake Shannon. A 42–45-inch (1,100–1,100 mm) diameter, 19,250-foot (5,870 m) long penstock carries water from a bifurcation (48.6914°N 121.7919°W, 2,750 feet (840 m) a.s.l.) to the powerhouse. Water is discharged from the powerhouse through a short run on Sandy Creek to Baker Lake. Up to 120 cubic feet per second (3.4 m^{3}/s) is diverted to the powerhouse.

Rocky Creek Dam (48.6849°N 121.8065°W) is 18 feet (5.5 m) high, 32 feet (9.8 m) long at 2,770 feet (840 m) a.s.l.

Sulphur Creek Dam (48.6928°N 121.7928°W) is 15 feet (4.6 m) high, 37 feet (11 m) long at 2,755 feet (840 m) a.s.l.

Diversion of the creek affected the appearance of Upper and Middle Sulphur Creek Falls.
