= Easton Glacier =

Glacier in the United States

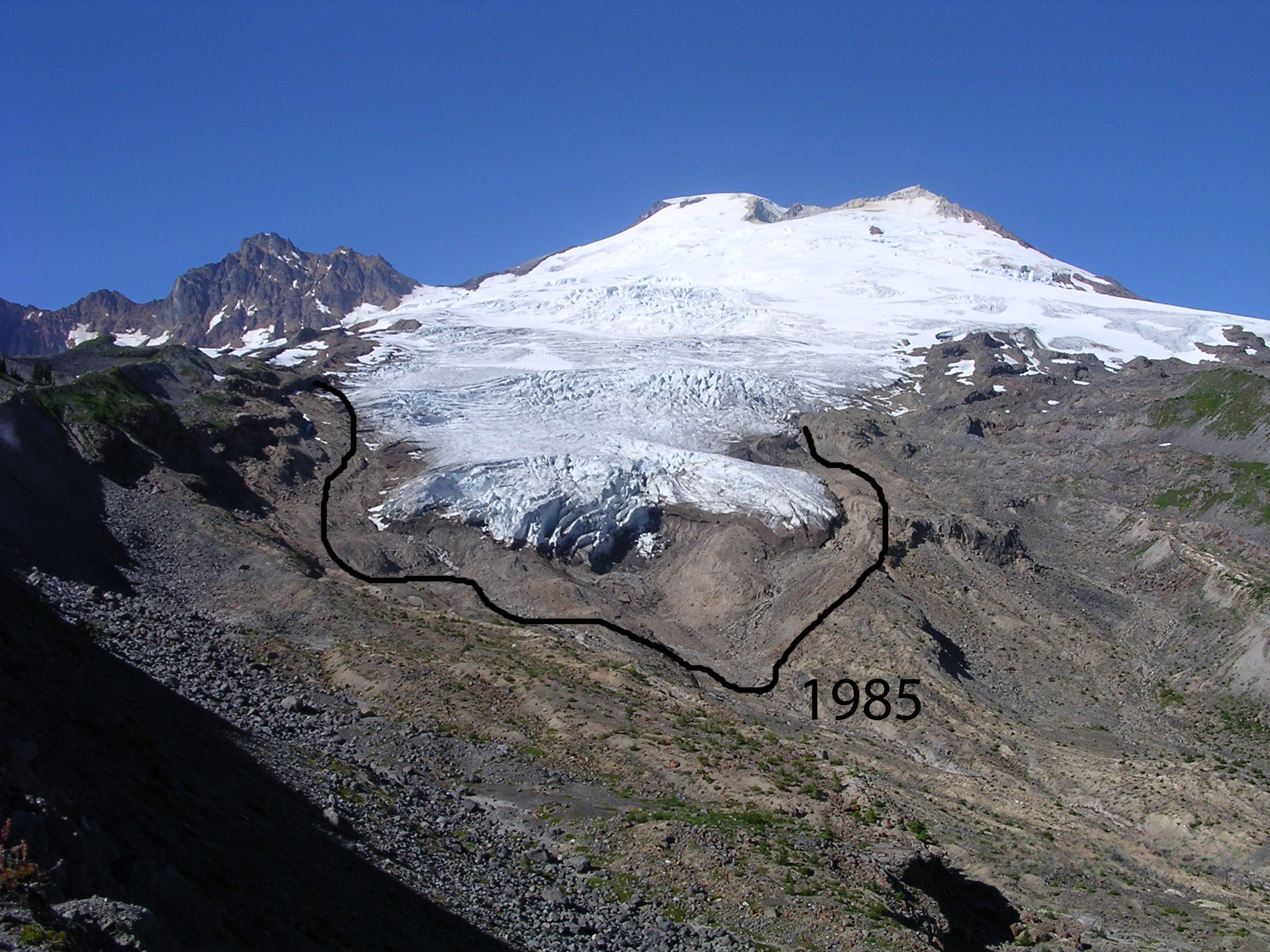
- Easton Glacier on the south slope of Mount Baker, note 1985 terminus position

- Location within Washington (state)
- Type: Mountain glacier
- Location: Whatcom County, Washington, United States
- Coordinates: 48°44′37″N 121°50′06″W
- Length: 2.5 mi (4.0 km)
- Thickness: 180 to 230 ft (55 to 70 m)
- Terminus: Moraine/talus
- Status: Retreating

Easton Glacier is one of the more prominent alpine glaciers on Mount Baker in the North Cascades of Washington state, United States. Named for Charles F. Easton of Bellingham, who did much to preserve the history of Mount Baker, it is positioned on the south face of the mountain and flanked by Squak and Deming Glaciers.

The glacier head is located near Sherman Crater at about 9,000 feet (2,700 m) and the terminus is at 5,500 feet (1,700 m). The glacier has created two very clear lateral moraines, the left being Metcaife Moraine and the right Railroad Grade. Evidence of the glacier's movement can clearly be seen on the valley floor. Many of the andesite outcrops and boulders have been polished, and glacial striations are easily visible.

Between 1850 and 1950, Easton Glacier retreated 7,940 ft (2,420 m). During a cooler and wetter period from 1950 to 1979, the glacier advanced 1,995 ft (608 m) but between 1980 and 2006 retreated back 902 ft (275 m). Between 1990 and 2009 Easton Glacier retreated 980 ft (300 m) and lost an average of 43 ft (13 m) of thickness.

== See also ==
- List of glaciers in the United States
