= Squak Glacier =

Glacier in Washington, United States

- Location within Washington (state)
- Type: Mountain glacier
- Location: Whatcom County, Washington, USA
- Coordinates: 48°44′48″N 121°48′34″W
- Length: 1.65 mi (2.66 km)
- Terminus: Moraine/talus
- Status: Retreating

Squak Glacier is located on the southeast slopes of Mount Baker in the North Cascades of the U.S. state of Washington. Squak Glacier is connected to Easton Glacier to the east and Talum Glaciers to the west. Between 1850 and 1950, Squak Glacier retreated 8,202 ft (2,500 m). During a cooler and wetter period from 1950 to 1979, the glacier advanced 305 ft (93 m) but between 1980 and 2006 retreated back 869 ft (265 m).

== See also ==
- List of glaciers in the United States
