= Talum Glaciers =

Glaciers in Washington, United States

- Location within Washington (state)
- Type: Mountain glacier
- Location: Whatcom County, Washington, USA
- Coordinates: 48°45′11″N 121°47′45″W
- Length: 1.3 mi (2.1 km)
- Terminus: Talus/Icefall
- Status: Retreating

The Talum Glaciers are located on the southeast slopes of Mount Baker in the North Cascades of the U.S. state of Washington. The glaciers are connected to Squak Glacier to the west. Between 1850 and 1950, the Talum Glaciers retreated 6,479 ft (1,975 m). During a cooler and wetter period from 1950 to 1979, the glaciers advanced 902 ft (275 m) but between 1980 and 2006 retreated back 951 ft (290 m).

== See also ==
- List of glaciers in the United States
