= Lake Shannon =

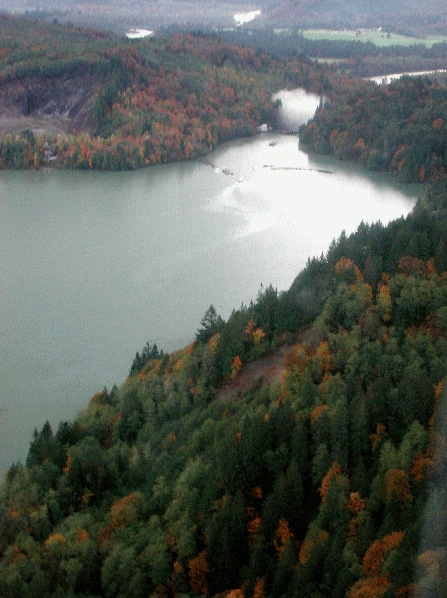
- Lake Shannon looking downstream during the floods of 2003, with the Lower Baker Dam in the distance

- Location within Washington (state) Location within the United States
- Location: North of Concrete, Skagit County, Washington, US
- Coordinates: 48°32′51″N 121°44′28″W
- Type: Reservoir
- Primary inflows: Baker River, Thunder Creek, Sulphur Creek, other small tributaries
- Primary outflows: Baker River
- Catchment area: 270 square miles (700 km^{2})
- Basin countries: United States
- Built: April 1, 1924
- First flooded: September 1, 1925
- Max. length: 7.5 miles (12.1 km)
- Max. width: 1 mile (1.6 km)
- Surface area: 2,190 acres (8.9 km^{2})
- Average depth: 70 feet (21 m)
- Max. depth: 280 feet (85 m)
- Water volume: 161,470 acre-feet (199,170,000 m^{3})
- Surface elevation: 436 feet (133 m) at full pool
- Frozen: In winter
- Islands: 1, unnamed, near north end
- Settlements: Concrete

Lake Shannon is a long, narrow reservoir on the Baker River in Skagit County, Washington in the United States. Formed in the 1920s by the construction of an arch dam just above the town of Concrete, the lake is approximately 7.5 miles (12 km) long and averages 0.6 miles (1 km) wide when full. Located just outside the western boundary of North Cascades National Park, Lake Shannon serves as the lower reservoir for Puget Sound Energy's Baker River Hydroelectric Project.

Before the creation of Lake Shannon, the area was used primarily for fur trapping, logging, and concrete making. The construction of Lower Baker Dam blocked salmon migration in the Baker River. An artificial fish passage system was begun in the 1950s and completed in 1959 after the construction of Upper Baker Dam, located upstream of Lake Shannon. The lake has abundant landlocked kokanee salmon, the by-product of salmon spawning in lake tributaries. Fishing, boating and water skiing are popular recreational activities on the lake.

== Description ==
The Baker River flows southeast and south for about 30 miles (50 km) to meet the Skagit River at Concrete. Less than 1 mile (1.6 km) above its mouth, a 285-foot-high (87 m) arch dam, the Lower Baker Dam, straddles an extremely tight and narrow gorge to form Lake Shannon, a 2,190-acre (8.9 km^{2}) lake.

The lake occupies a cleft in the Baker River Valley between a prominent river terrace to the west and a less obvious one on the east. While the west slope directly above the lake is dissected with many canyons, the east slope is smaller and smoother. The lake is surrounded by prominent forested mountains, but the surrounding terrain is not as steep and rugged as the upper watershed.

The reservoir is widest in the lower half and especially in a stretch about 3 miles (5 km) upstream of the dam. Near the middle, the lake narrows dramatically as it squeezes between the west shore and a narrow promontory that juts out into the valley. The upper half of the lake is very narrow, and the far upper end protrudes into the Mount Baker-Snoqualmie National Forest. Just above the north end of the lake, the Upper Baker Dam blocks the Baker River once again to form an expanded Baker Lake.

The dominant geographical feature in the area is Mount Baker, which rises 10,781 feet (3,286 m) a few miles to the northwest of Lake Shannon. Mount Shuksan, a slightly smaller peak, rises 9,127 feet (2,782 m) further to the north-northeast. Aside from the Baker River, some major streams that feed the lake are Thunder Creek (which meets the lake near the promontory that nearly severs it in half) and Sulphur Creek, which flows directly into the lake during high water.

The Baker River Road runs in a northerly direction along the east side of Lake Shannon, while the North Cascades Highway crosses the Baker River just below Lake Shannon. Although most of the inflow to Lake Shannon is from releases from Upper Baker Dam, it also receives inflow from 82 square miles (210 km^{2}) of adjacent watershed.

== Dams and facilities ==
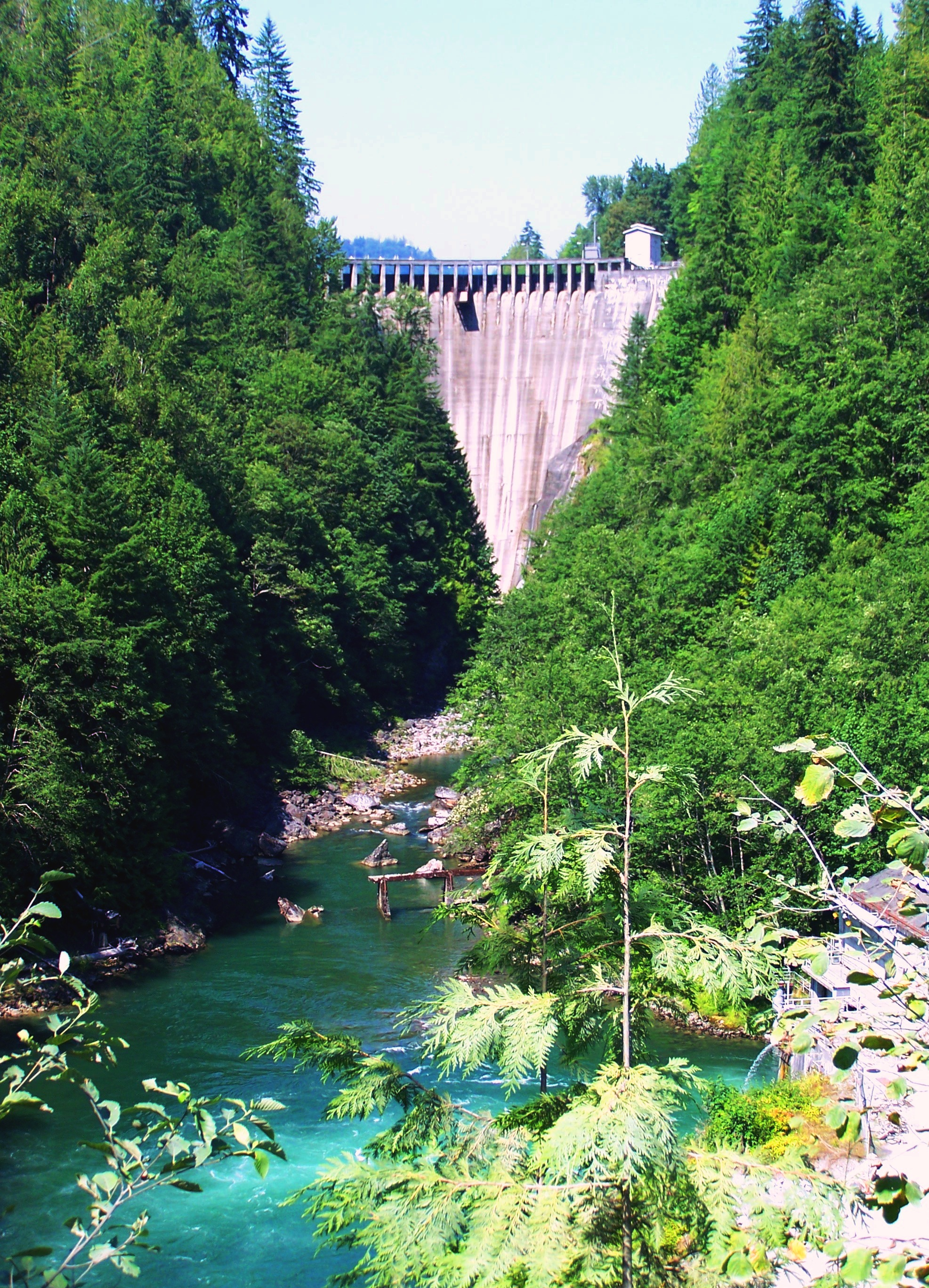
Lower Baker Dam from the river below

The Lower Baker Dam (48°32′51″N 121°44′28″W) was constructed in 1925 as the first of two dams that generate power for the Baker River Hydroelectric Project, owned by Puget Sound Energy. It is a thick-arch dam 285 feet (87 m) high and 550 feet (170 m) in length. The spillways are over the crest, consisting of about twenty-four openings. A penstock diverts water from the lake to a powerhouse on the left bank of the river, which generates 79 MW of power, and returns the water to the river just downstream of the dam. This results in a stretch of river that is nearly dry most of the time. The full pool elevation of the lake is 438 feet (134 m), while the minimum lake level for power generation is 370 feet (110 m) and dead pool elevation is 355 feet (108 m). The lake holds 161,470 acre-feet (199,170,000 m^{3}) of water at full pool.

Below the Lower Baker Dam, another structure — the "fish passage structure" — exists as the river flows through the town of Concrete. This concrete weir is the first stage in a fish elevator and flume that carries anadromous fish upstream to Baker Lake, where they are released into the water and allowed to swim upstream to the Baker River's remaining spawning grounds.

== History ==
Prior to the construction of the Baker River project, Lake Shannon did not exist and Baker Lake was a smaller lake formed by a glacial moraine. Anadromous fish would migrate up the Baker in numbers of up to 20,000 each spring. In the 19th century, the Baker River area was primarily used for the timber industry. Large deposits of lime around the mouth of the Baker River were taken advantage of by a cement plant built in present-day Concrete.

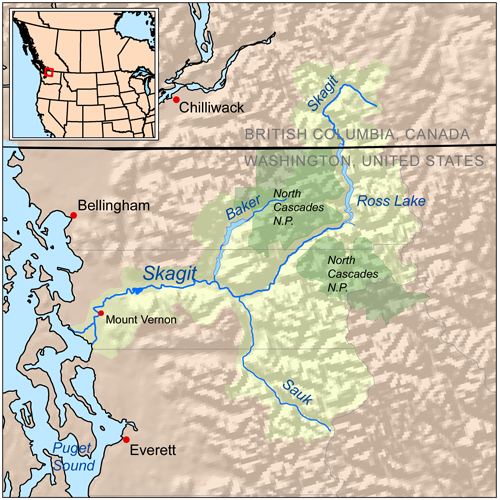
Map of the Skagit River drainage basin showing Lake Shannon on the Baker River (near center)

On April 1, 1924, the Lower Baker Dam was official begun by the Stone & Webster Company, in a site known as Eden Canyon. At first, 150 men worked on the project, which grew to a workforce of 900 by the next year. In early 1925, the Lower Baker Dam was completed to a height of 230 feet (70 m) by a construction crew of 1,300, and in November of that year, the reservoir first filled to capacity. (The dam was later raised 55 feet (17 m) to its present height.) The filling of the reservoir inundated the first railroad bridge across the river, the Baker River Bridge, a 190-foot (58 m)-high wooden trestle. The first power generated at the dam was on November 19, 1925.

The construction of the dam and the forming of the reservoir had serious impacts on the salmon of the Baker River — the dam left only 1 mile (1.6 km) of river accessible to returning salmon. Before the dam was built, in many years, over twenty thousand salmon would return to the river to spawn. Afterwards, the returning population rarely would top 3,000 fish, and decreased even more in the 1980s, culminating in a record low of 99 fish in 1985. A structure was constructed across the lower Baker River below Lake Shannon, and this was originally used to capture returning anadromous fish and in conjunction with a few other facilities, carried fish up into Lake Shannon until 1959, when the system was extended to place the fish in Baker Lake instead.

On July 9, 1959, Upper Baker Dam was completed and the inflow to Lake Shannon became regulated for the first time. A major landslide in 1965 crushed the Lower Baker powerhouse and its two turbines, Units 1 and 2. Units 3 and 4 were constructed near the same spot, and the original, 990-foot (300 m)-long penstock was lengthened by 420 feet (130 m), to 1,410 feet (430 m), to reach the new powerhouse. This new structure was built with a sloped roof to minimize potential damage. In 1991, a water diversion project, the Koma Kulshan Project, diverted about 120 cubic feet per second (3.4 m^{3}/s) from two west-bank Lake Shannon tributaries to Baker Lake.

== Natural history ==
One of the most abundant fishes in Lake Shannon is kokanee salmon, but this population is said to differ from true kokanee. True kokanees are established in freshwater, but the kokanees of Lake Shannon may be the by-product of sockeye salmon and coho salmon that spawned in tributaries of the lake — including Sulphur Creek and Thunder Creek — either via natural spawining gravels or artificially constructed ones. Some of the fry escaped the conduits that carry outmigrating young salmon into the lower Baker and the Skagit, establishing a population of kokanee. There is also a population of bull trout present in the lake.

The Lake Shannon area is dominated by Douglas fir and other coniferous and deciduous woodlands.

== Recreation ==
Lake Shannon is about 1 mile (1.6 km) north of Concrete and 35 miles (56 km) east of Mount Vernon. The lake itself is mostly accessed by following the Baker River Road. Parts of Lake Shannon are within the Mount Baker-Snoqualmie National Forest, which also contains all of Baker Lake. Swimming, boating and water-skiing are available on the lake, and kokanee salmon is abundant. However, the only access to the Lake Shannon boat launch area involves passing through privately owned land. The lake is open for fishing from the last Saturday of April until the 31st of October in most years. There are plans to extend the current hiking trail system surrounding the two reservoirs by 8 miles (13 km) and other general improvements within the hydroelectric project area.

== See also ==
- List of lakes of Washington
- Skagit River Hydroelectric Project
