= Baker River (Washington) =

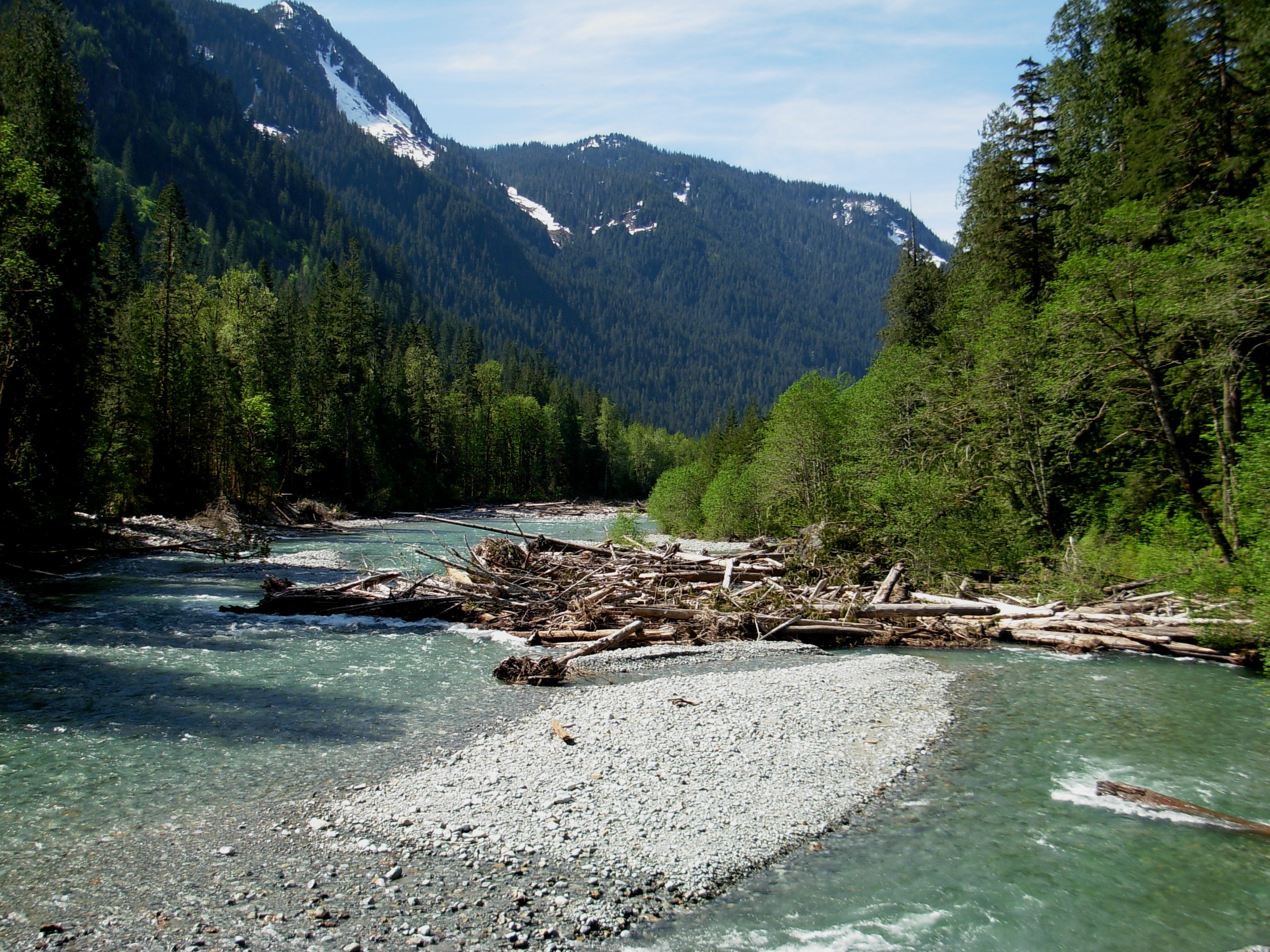
- Baker River upstream of Baker Lake

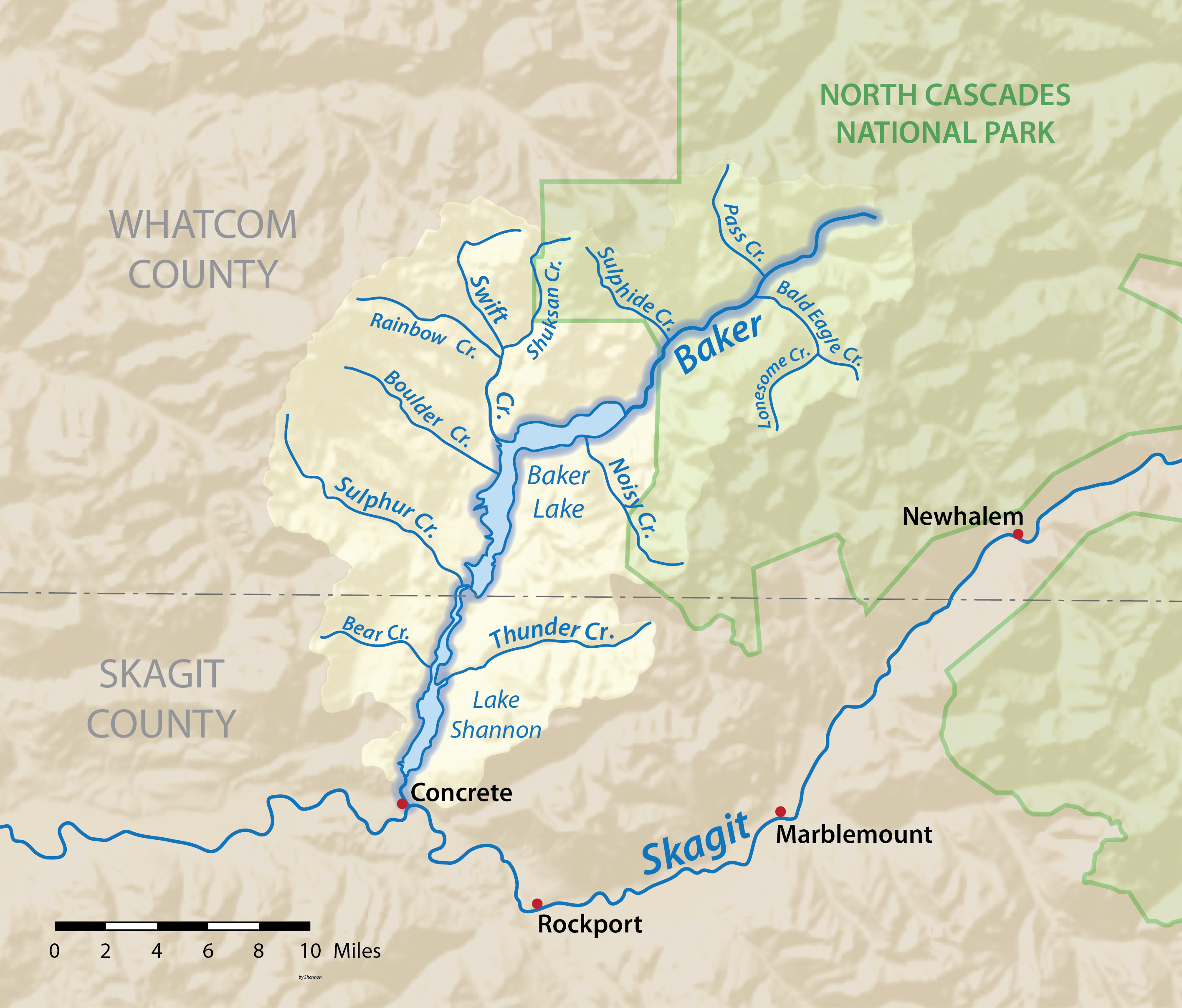
- Map of the Baker River watershed

- Location of the mouth of Baker River in Washington

Location
- Country: United States
- State: Washington
- County: Skagit, Whatcom

Physical characteristics
- Source: Cascade Range
  - location: Whatcom Peak, Whatcom County
  - coordinates: 48°51′1″N 121°22′52″W
  - elevation: 5,800 ft (1,800 m)
- Mouth: Skagit River
  - location: Concrete, Skagit County
  - coordinates: 48°45′54″N 121°32′34″W
  - elevation: 820 ft (250 m)
- Length: 30 mi (48 km)
- Basin size: 297 sq mi (770 km^{2})
- Discharge
  - location: river mile 0.7 near Concrete, WA
  - average: 2,649 cu ft/s (75.0 m^{3}/s)
  - minimum: 30 cu ft/s (0.85 m^{3}/s)
  - maximum: 36,600 cu ft/s (1,040 m^{3}/s)

The Baker River (Lushootseed: dxʷqəlb) is an approximately 30-mile (48 km), southward-flowing tributary of the Skagit River in northwestern Washington in the United States. It drains an area of the high North Cascades in the watershed of Puget Sound north of Seattle, and east of Mount Baker. With a watershed of approximately 270 square miles (700 km^{2}) in a complex of deep valleys partially inside North Cascades National Park, it is the last major tributary of the Skagit before the larger river reaches its mouth on Skagit Bay. The river flows through Concrete, Washington, near its mouth and has two hydroelectric dams owned by Puget Sound Energy.

== Course ==
The Baker River rises in the Cascade Range near Whatcom Peak, in the northern section of North Cascades National Park. It flows south, starting in the Baker River Valley north-east of Mount Shuksan. The river flows generally southwest through a steep glacial valley, receiving several short glacial-fed tributaries from surrounding mountains. Many of these tributaries harbor tall, but never officially measured waterfalls. Most of the southern half of the river is impounded in artificial lakes, both part of the Baker River Hydroelectric Project. The first reservoir is 9-mile (14 km)-long Baker Lake, impounded by Upper Baker Dam. (The lake was formerly a natural lake, until its level was raised by the 312-foot (95 m)-high dam.) Lake Shannon, impounded by Lower Baker Dam, begins immediately below Baker Lake and stretches about 7.5 miles (12.1 km) downstream. Below Lower Baker Dam the Baker River flows unimpeded (except for a small weir at a fish passage station) for about a mile before emptying into the Skagit River.

Most of Baker Lake is in the Mount Baker–Snoqualmie National Forest. Upper Baker Dam is located in Whatcom County and Lower Baker Dam is located in Skagit County above the town of Concrete. Both dams are owned and operated by Puget Sound Energy, a private utility company.

== Natural history ==
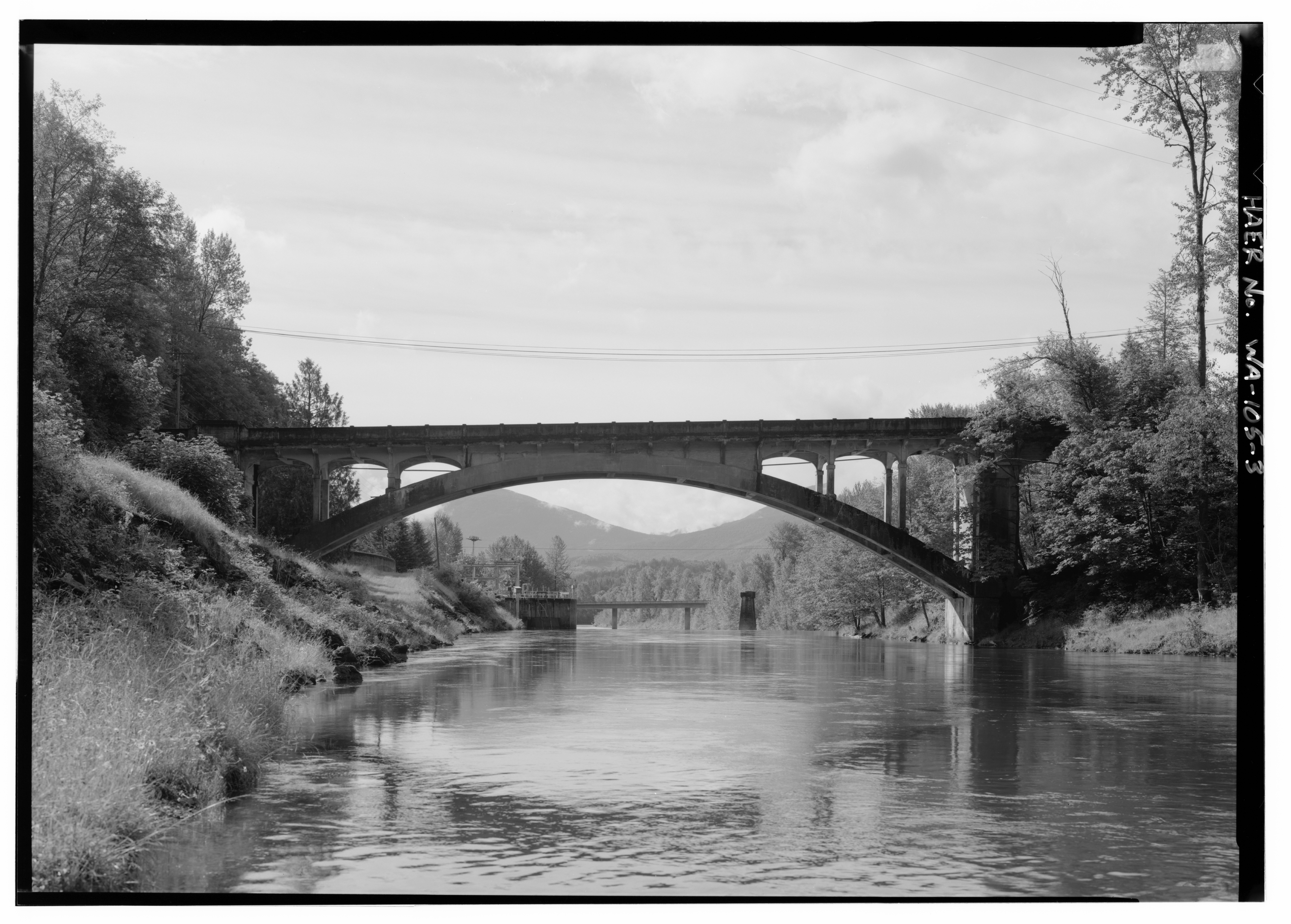
Baker River at Concrete

Baker River sockeye are the only known sustaining population of Sockeye salmon in the Skagit River drainage basin. The Washington Department of Fish and Wildlife (WDFW) has determined the Baker River sockeye to be genetically distinct from other sockeye salmon. As of 1992 the condition of the population was listed as "critical". In 1985 only 92 adults were found to return to the river. Since the 1990s, however, the population has recovered somewhat, in part due to improvements in the smolt trapping and transportation system. 20,235 fish were counted in 2003 and since 2010, the numbers have been between 10,000 & 30,000 fish counted per year. The WDFW and others' models predicted a run size for Baker sockeye of 46,268 in 2015. In 2023 the Baker sockeye return was estimated at over 65,000, unexpectedly high and potentially a new record since monitoring began, and approaching the targeted return of 100,000.

Before Lower Baker Dam was built in 1925 the fish had free access to the river and natural (pre-dammed) Baker Lake. The annual sockeye run at that time was estimated to be approximately 20,000 fish. Artificial enhancement began in 1896 when the State of Washington constructed a hatchery on Baker Lake. This was the first establishment for the hatching of sockeye salmon. The hatchery closed in 1933. The construction of Upper Baker Dam in 1959 inundated the natural Baker Lake and surrounding valley, including the spawning grounds of the Baker River sockeye. Artificial spawning beds were constructed at the upper end of the new Baker Lake. An additional spawning beach was built on Sulfur Creek in 1990. All returning sockeye are trapped below Lower Baker Dam and transported to the artificial spawning beaches.

The Baker River also supports other anadromous salmonids such as coho (Oncorhynchus kisutch), chinook (Oncorhynchus tshawytscha), pink (Oncorhynchus gorbuscha), and chum (Oncorhynchus keta) salmon, winter– and summer–run steelhead trout (Oncorhynchus mykiss) and sea-run cutthroat trout (Oncorhynchus clarki clarki).

== Tributaries ==
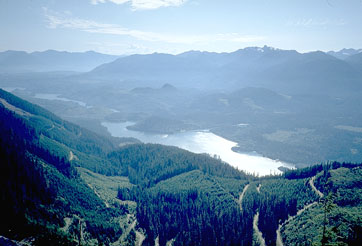
Baker River valley from the northeast

Tributaries of the Baker are listed proceeding upstream. L and R denote left and right bank, respectively:

- Thunder Creek (L)
- Bear Creek
- Rocky Creek (R)
- Sulphur Creek (R)
- Anderson Creek
- Sandy Creek (R)
- Park Creek (R)
- Swift Creek (R)
  - Morovitz Creek
- Shannon Creek (R)
- Shuksan Lake Creek (R)
- Blum Creek (L)
- Sulphide Creek (R)
- Bald Eagle Creek
- Pass Creek
- Picket Creek (L)
- Mineral Creek

== See also ==
- List of rivers of Washington (state)
