= Deming Glacier (Washington) =

Glacier in Washington, United States

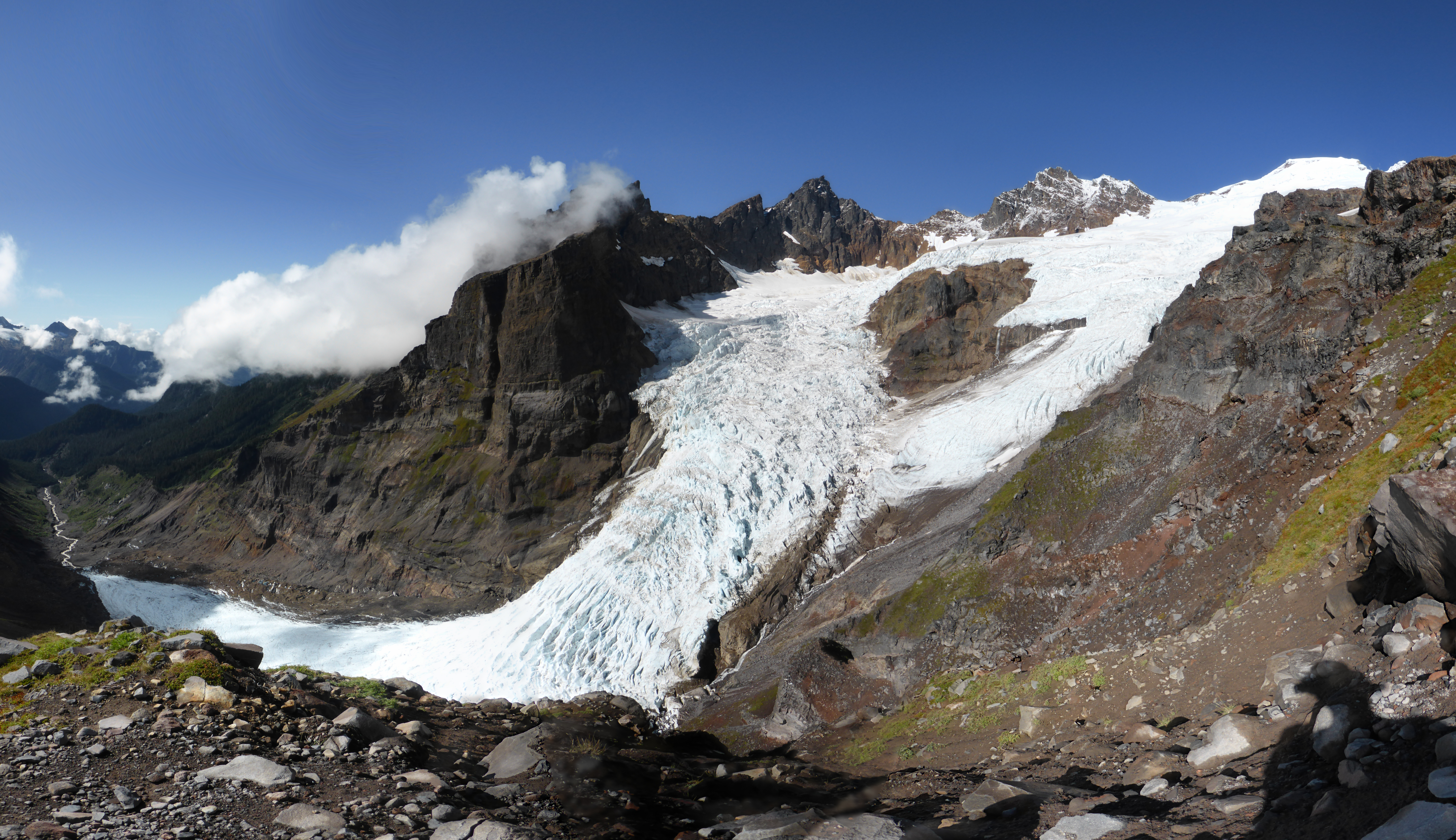
- Deming Glacier

- Location within Washington (state)
- Type: Mountain glacier
- Location: Whatcom County, Washington, USA
- Coordinates: 48°45′47″N 121°50′20″W
- Length: 2.25 mi (3.62 km)
- Terminus: Moraine/talus
- Status: Retreating

Deming Glacier is located on Mount Baker in the North Cascades of the U.S. state of Washington. Between 1850 and 1950, Deming Glacier retreated 7,217 ft (2,200 m). During a cooler and wetter period from 1950 to 1979, the glacier advanced 2,060 ft (630 m) but between 1980 and 2006 retreated back 1,140 ft (350 m). Situated on the southwest slopes of Mount Baker, Deming Glacier is bordered by the Easton Glacier to the east and the Black Buttes ridge to the west.

Deming Glacier was named for the town of Deming, Washington, whose residents built a trail to Mount Baker in 1909.

== See also ==
- List of glaciers in the United States
