= Shannon Creek =

River in the United States of America

Location
- Country: United States

Physical characteristics
- Source
  - elevation: 5,016 feet (1,529 m)
- Mouth
  - location: Baker River at Baker Lake
  - coordinates: 48°44′14″N 121°35′25″W
  - elevation: 725 feet (221 m)

Shannon Creek is a short tributary to the Baker River in Whatcom County, Washington, near the southwest border of North Cascades National Park. It rises in two forks a few miles south of Mount Shuksan; the glacier-fed north fork begins at elevation 5,016 feet (1,529 m), and the non-glacial south fork begins at 2,611 feet (796 m). Roughly halfway through its length, the two forks join and then flow into Baker Lake reservoir, at elevation 725 feet (221 m). Shannon Creek joins the Baker several miles downstream of Sulphide Creek and upstream of Swift Creek, a much larger south-flowing drainage.

== See also ==
- List of rivers of Washington (state)
