= Boulder Glacier (Washington) =

Glacier in the state of Washington

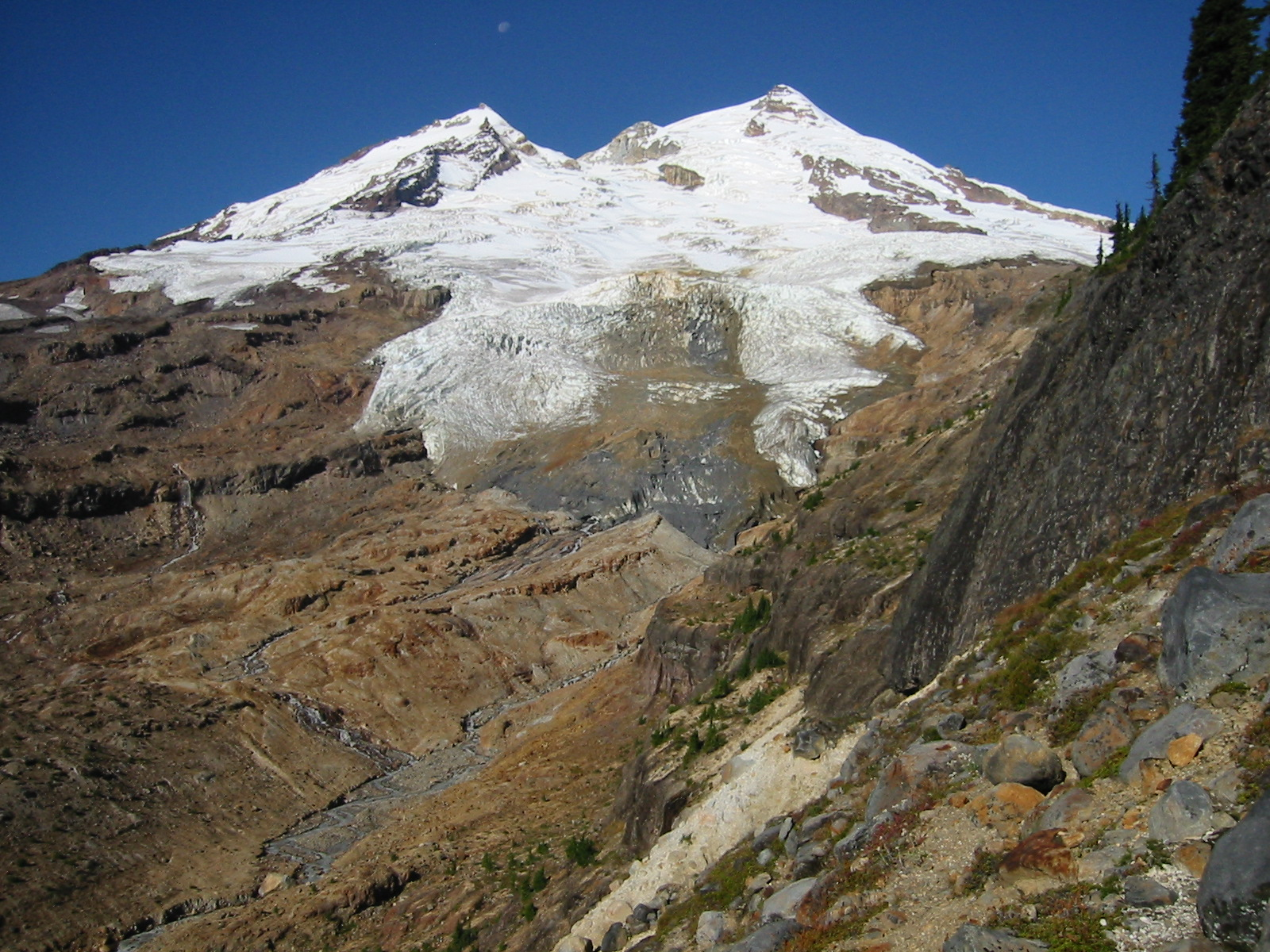
- Boulder Glacier on the southeast slope of Mount Baker

- Location within Washington (state)
- Type: Mountain glacier
- Location: Whatcom County, Washington, USA
- Coordinates: 48°46′04″N 121°47′53″W
- Length: 1.5 mi (2.4 km)
- Terminus: icefall/talus
- Status: Retreating

Boulder Glacier is located on the southeast slope of Mount Baker, a stratovolcano near the Pacific coast of North America in the Cascade Range of Washington. Boulder Glacier is the sixth largest on Mount Baker with an area of 1.3 square miles (3.4 km^{2}). It flows from the summit crater between Grant Peak (10,781 ft (3,286 m)) and Sherman Peak (10,141 ft (3,091 m)) to about 5,000 ft (1,500 m). It is noteworthy for retreating 1,610 ft (490 m) between 1987 and 2008, leaving newly exposed rock and soil behind.

Between 1850 and 1950, the glacier retreated 8,700 ft (2,700 m). William Long of the United States Forest Service observed the glacier beginning to advance due to cooler and wetter weather in 1953. This was followed by a 2,438-foot (743 m) advance by 1979. The 1979 terminus position is where the small stream enters Boulder Creek from the southwest. Observations in 2005 suggest that the lowest thousand feet or several hundred meters of the glacier is stagnant and will likely disappear. In the pictures, this section of the glacier is gray with rock debris and has few crevasses. On the west side of Boulder Creek is a small waterfall revealed by the recent recession of the glacier.

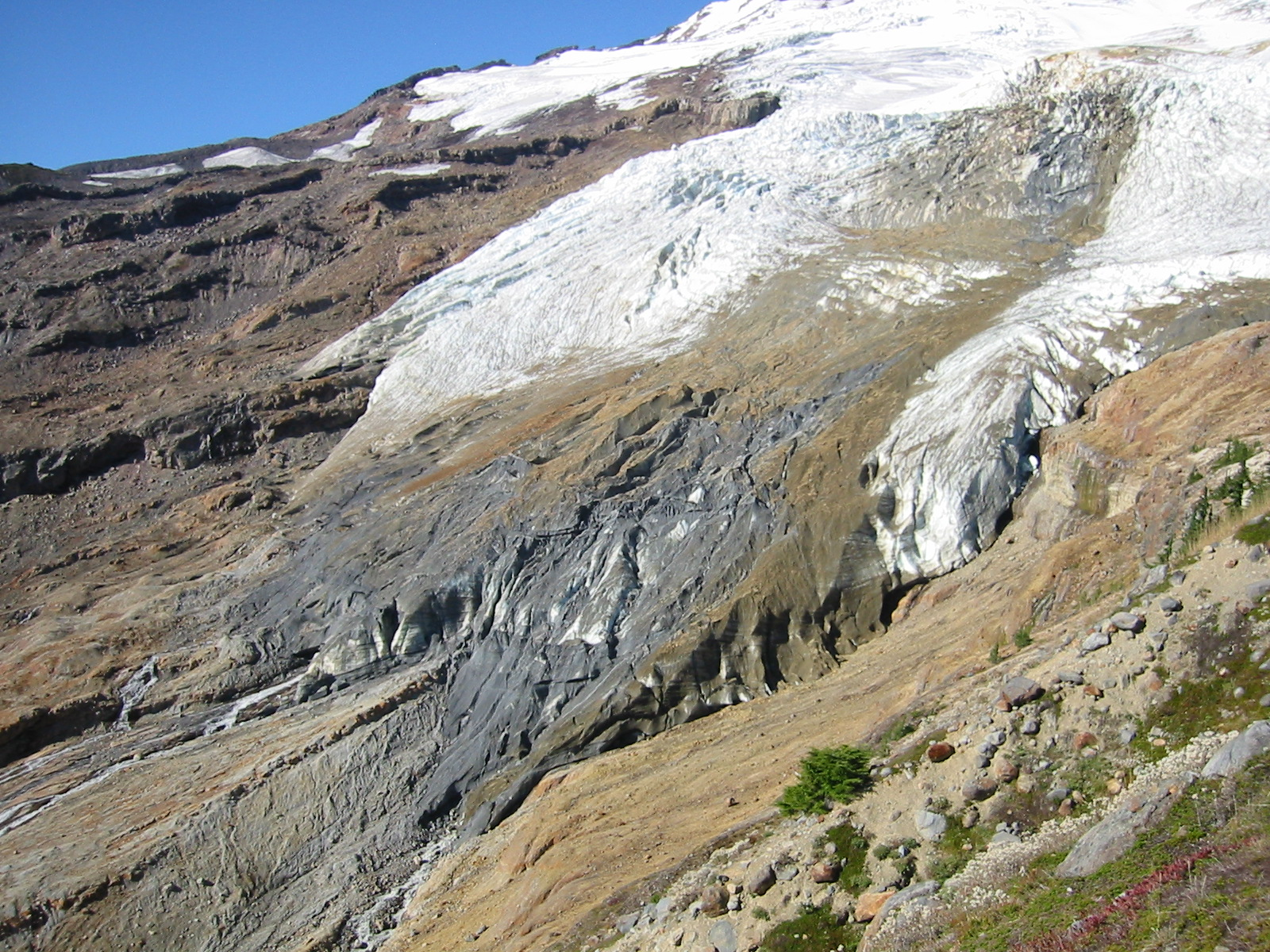
Stagnant, rock-debris-covered glacier terminus in 2004

Boulder Glacier may be approached via the Boulder Ridge Trail number 605. The trail passes through a climax community of pacific silver fir and related species of disparate ages with many standing snags. In the fall, a large variety of mushroom species emerge. Near 4,300 ft (1,300 m) elevation, the trail ascends a lateral glacial moraine. At 4,600 ft (1,400 m) the route ascends about 20 ft (6.1 m) of Class 2 rock and 120 ft (37 m) of steep subalpine forest to reach the ridge crest. Soon thereafter, the trail disappears.

Boulder Ridge consists of scenic heather-covered benches and a number of lateral moraines left by vanished glaciers. Glacial retreat has left the upper portion of the ridge barren and unstable and rockfall from the terminus of that portion of the glacier is a hazard to the unwary visitor.

Boulder Glacier is one of the more popular climbing routes on Mount Baker. First climbed on August 24, 1891, it is most often ascended in combination with the cleaver between Boulder and Park Glacier to the north to bypass densely crevassed sections of the glacier. At about 10,000 ft (3,000 m) elevation, the route passes to the southwest of steep rock and ice to reach the summit ridge east of Grant Peak.

== Gallery ==
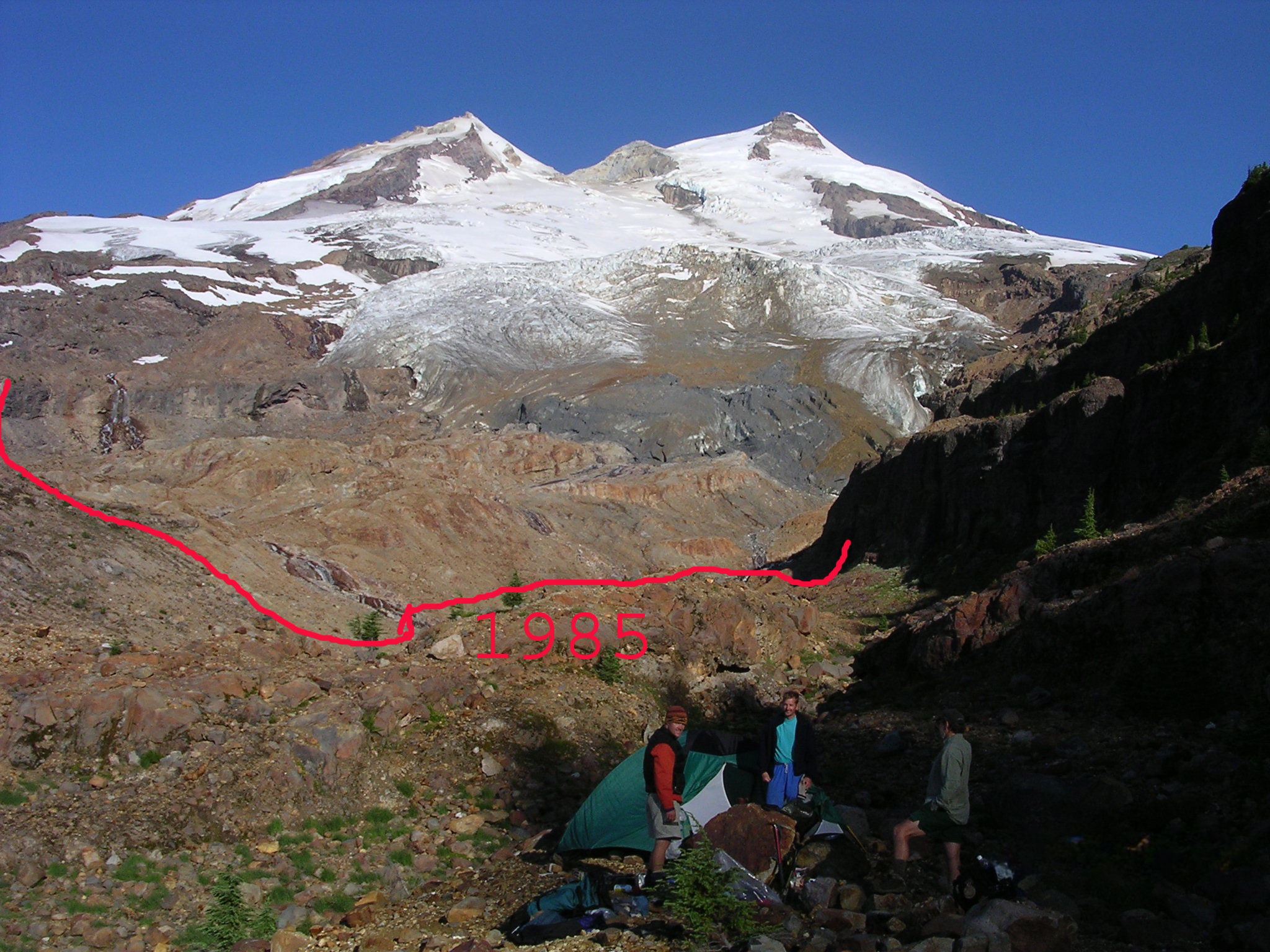
Boulder Glacier in 2003 with its 1985 terminus in red

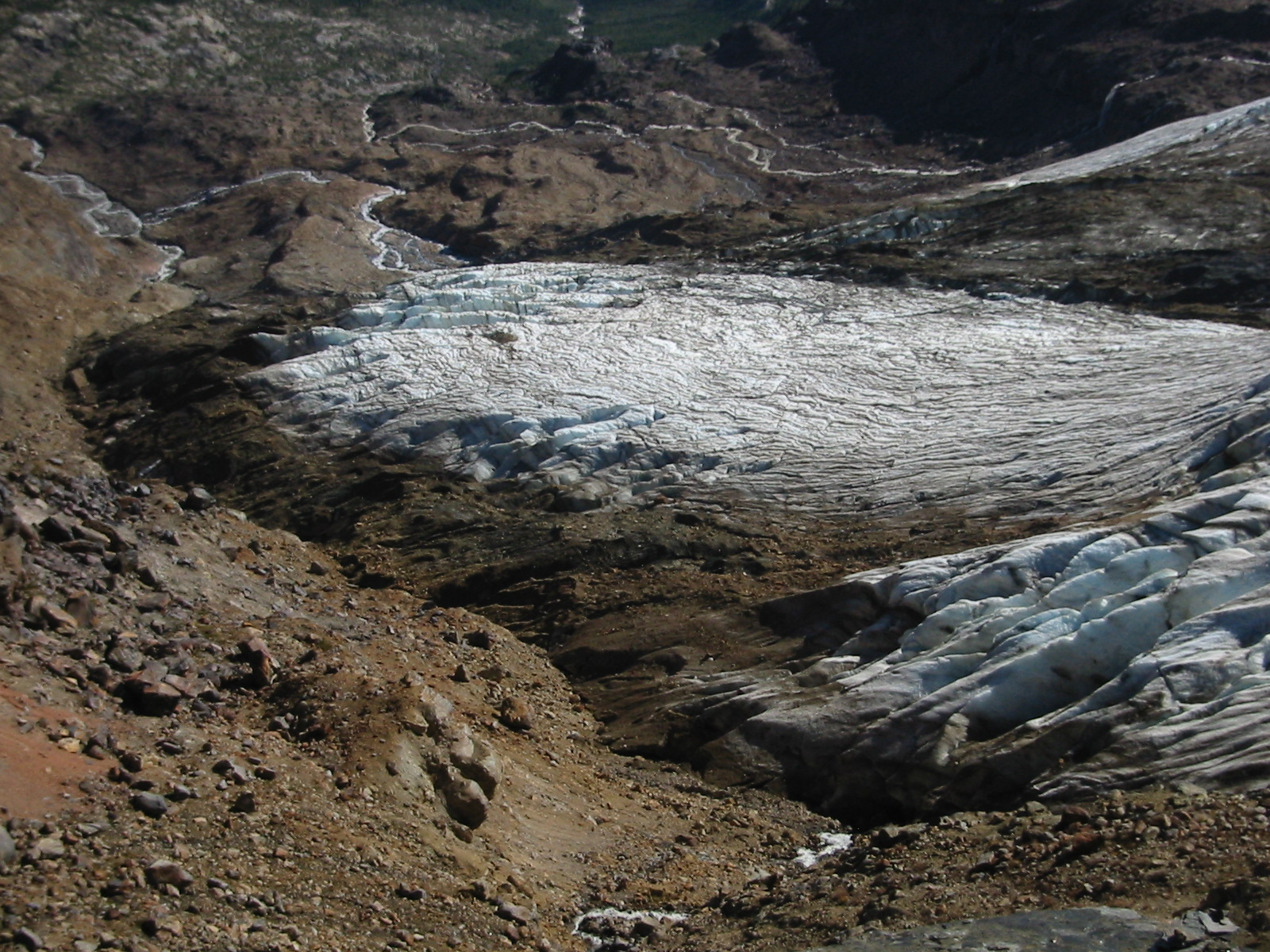
View of 2004 terminus from above

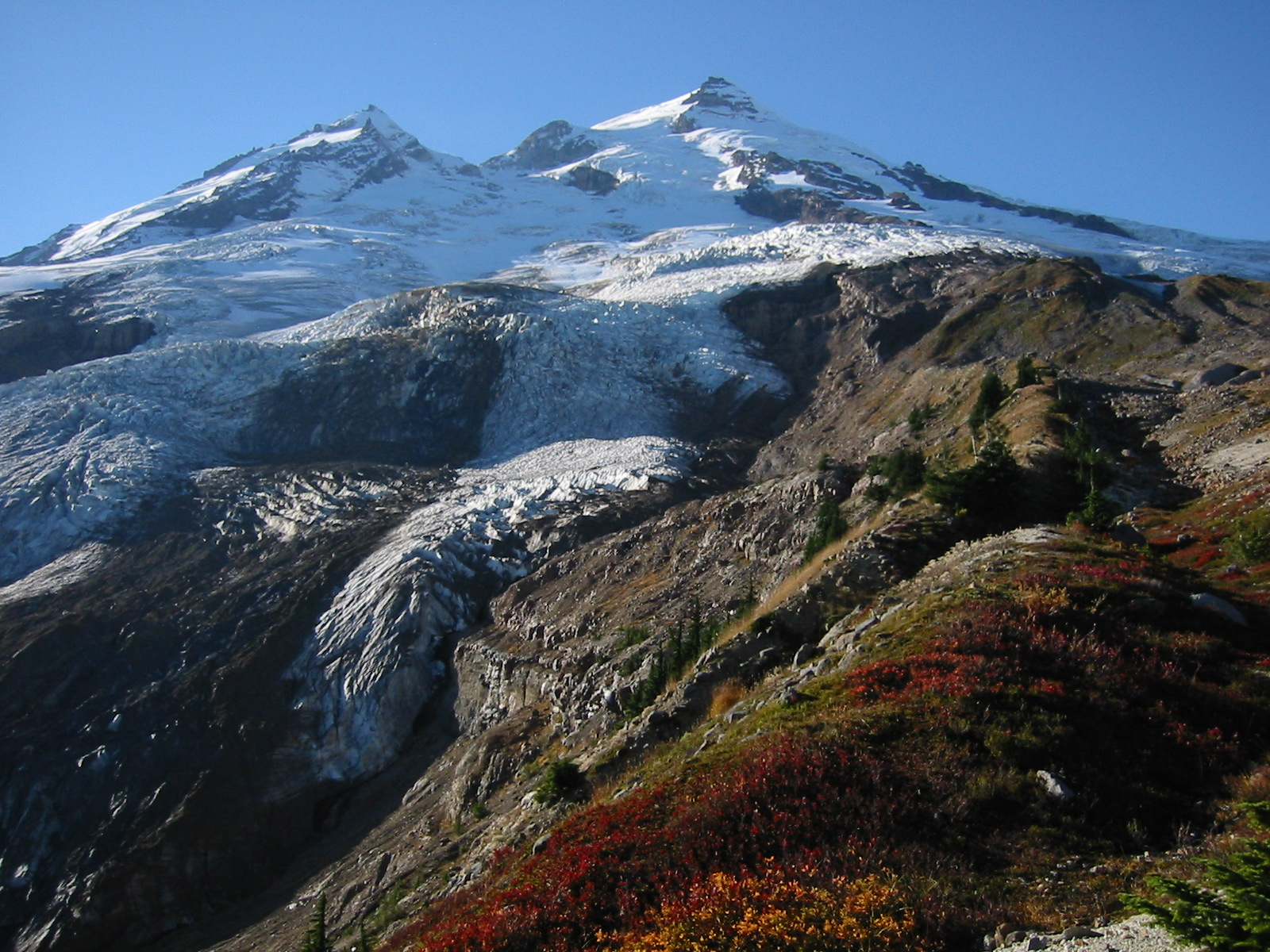
View from Boulder Ridge

== See also ==
- Mount Baker
- Retreat of glaciers since 1850
- List of glaciers in the United States
