= Swift Creek (Washington) =

River in Washington, United States of America

- Location of the mouth of Swift Creek in Washington Swift Creek (Washington) (the United States)

Location
- Country: United States

Physical characteristics
- Source
  - location: Table Mountain
  - coordinates: 48°50′35″N 121°42′47″W
  - elevation: 4,261 feet (1,299 m)
- Mouth
  - location: Baker River at Baker Lake
  - coordinates: 48°43′16″N 121°39′01″W
  - elevation: 725 feet (221 m)
- Length: 7 mi (11 km)

Swift Creek is a southward-flowing tributary of the Baker River, about 7 miles (11 km) long, in Whatcom County in the U.S. state of Washington. It rises in glaciers near Table Mountain, Mount Ann, and Kulshan Ridge, and flows west before being joined by more glacial tributaries. It then winds south-southeast for several miles to Baker Lake reservoir, and there it is joined by Morovitz Creek directly before it enters the lake. Park Creek is a small east-flowing stream that enters Baker Lake very near Swift Creek, but should not be confused as a tributary with it. NFD 11 (Baker Lake Road) crosses the creek near its mouth, which is just downstream of Shannon Creek.

== See also ==
- List of rivers of Washington (state)
