= Black Buttes =

Extinct stratovolcano in Washington

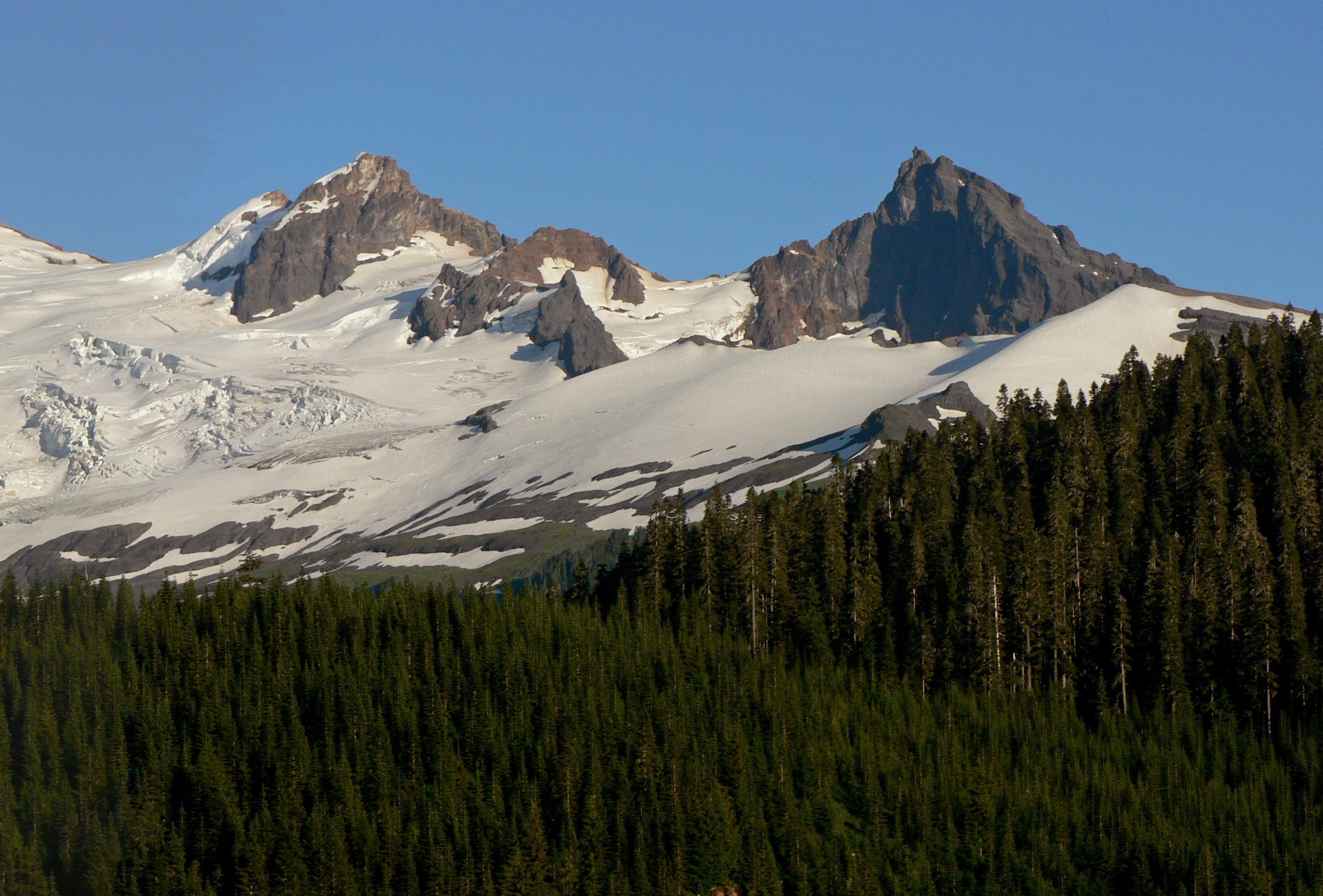
- The rocky peaks of the eroded Black Buttes

Highest point
- Peak: Colfax Peak
- Elevation: 9,440 ft (2,880 m)+
- Coordinates: 48°46′17″N 121°50′38″W

Geography
- Location within Washington (state)
- Location: Whatcom County, Washington, U.S.

The Black Buttes, also known historically as the Sawtooth Rocks, make up a stratovolcano in the Cascade Volcanic Arc in Whatcom County, Washington, United States. Glacially eroded remnants of this extinct volcano rise above the Deming Glacier, part of the glacier system of the nearby volcano, Mount Baker. There are three major peaks—Colfax, Lincoln, and Seward—all of which can be climbed.

The volcano was last active during the Middle Pleistocene from 495,000 to 288,000 years ago. Mount Baker, a much younger volcano, sits on top of lava erupted from Black Buttes Volcano.

== Geography ==
The Black Buttes represent the remains of a large stratovolcano that was once located in the approximate location of its neighbor, Mount Baker. Black Buttes lies about 2 miles (3 km) from Mount Baker, between Baker and the middle fork of Nooksack River, in Whatcom County, Washington state.

The volcano reaches an elevation of at least 9,440 feet (2,880 m) at Colfax Peak. Its peaks adjacent to Coleman Glacier, Thunder Glacier, and Deming Glacier. These peaks include the two principal summits, Colfax Peak (or East Butte), and Lincoln Peak (or West Butte), as well as the third major summit known as Seward Peak.

=== Colfax Peak ===
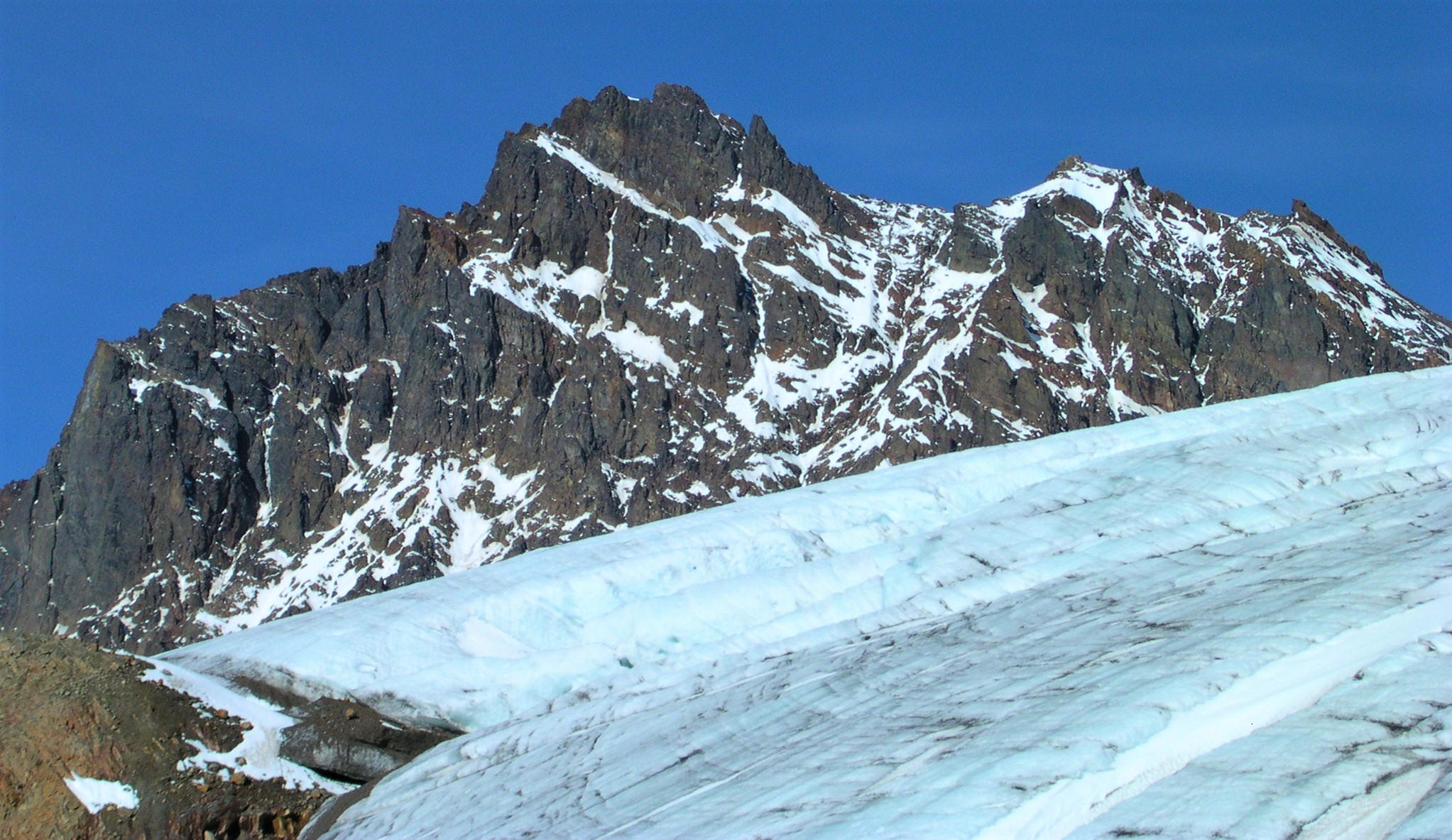
Colfax Peak

First climbed by David Anderson, Clarence A. Fisher, and Paul Hugdahl in 1921, It has a small ice cap on its eastern flank, along with a hanging ice cliff on its northern flank, and it consists of extremely steep rock walls. The route up this summit traverses easy slopes, starting at the Mount Baker saddle from the Coleman Glacier Route, and running for about an hour along a lava ridge or snowslopes. The peak's northern flank was first ascended by Ed Cooper and Fergus O'Conner on May 4, 1958, and demanded ice screws. The western side of the northern flank was first climbed by Paul Johanson and S. Reilly Moss in September, 1974, close to the 1958 route, and the trail takes approximately four hours.

=== Lincoln Peak ===
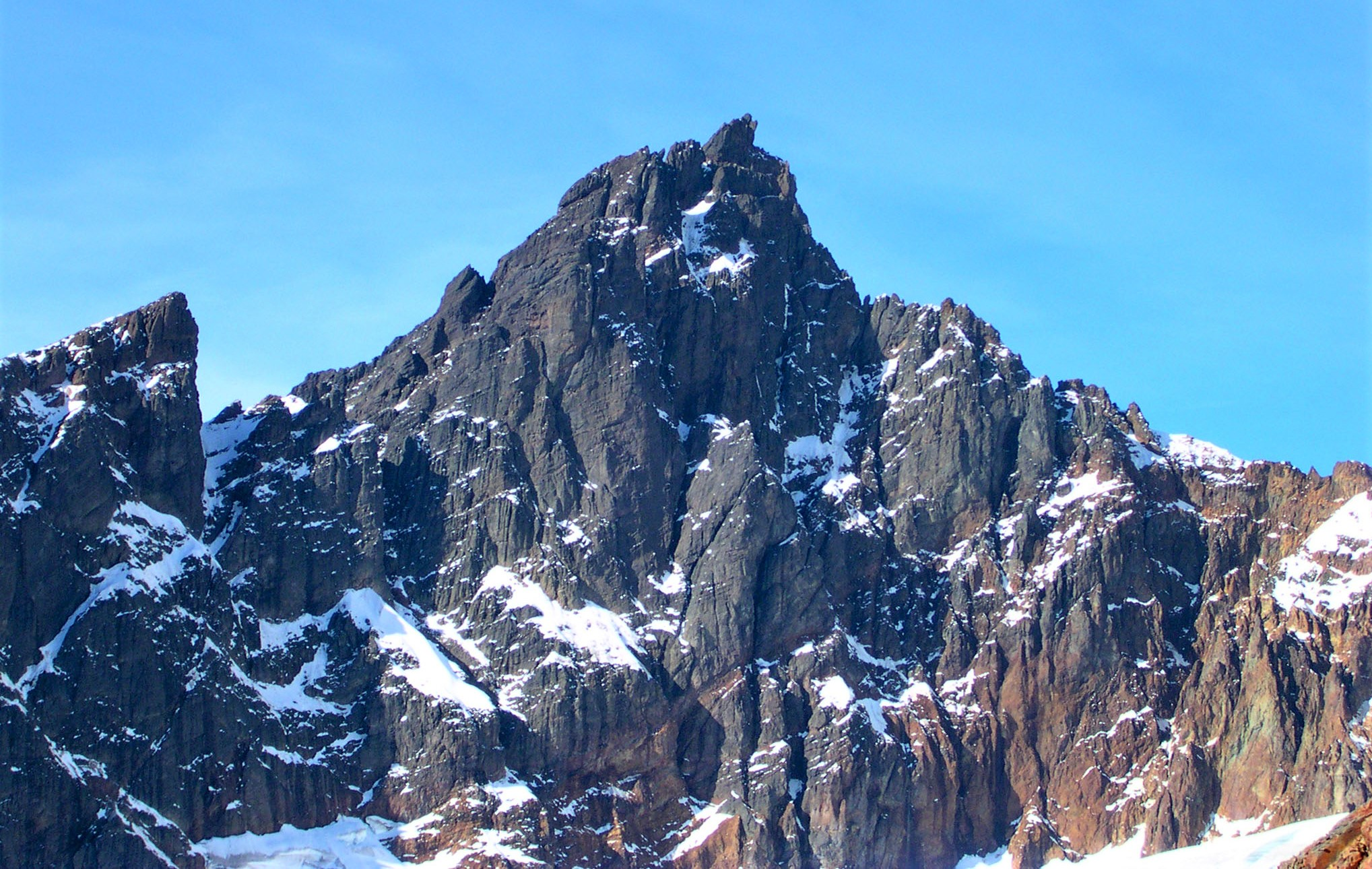
Lincoln Peak, south aspect

Located 0.71 miles (1.14 km) west of Colfax Peak, Lincoln Peak, also known as West Butte, has an elevation of 9,085 feet (2,769 m). It was first climbed by Fred Beckey, Wesley Grande, John Rupley, and Herb Staley on July 22, 1956. The southwestern face can be climbed, and it is accessible by following the cirque on Thunder Glacier from the Heliotrope Ridge Trail, and then rappeling. The climb is technically demanding, taking about 9 hours, and it has significant rockfall hazards. The cirque can also be accessed from Middle Fork Nooksack River Road.

The least accessible of the Black Buttes summits, Lincoln Peak has a 1,000-foot (300 m) northern face as well as a 1,500-foot (460 m) face to the east. To the west, Lincoln Peak drops into Thunder Glacier's cirque; its southern side features gullies and ridges. It was rated as one of the ten most difficult peaks in the state of Washington by the climber Dallas Kloke

=== Seward Peak ===
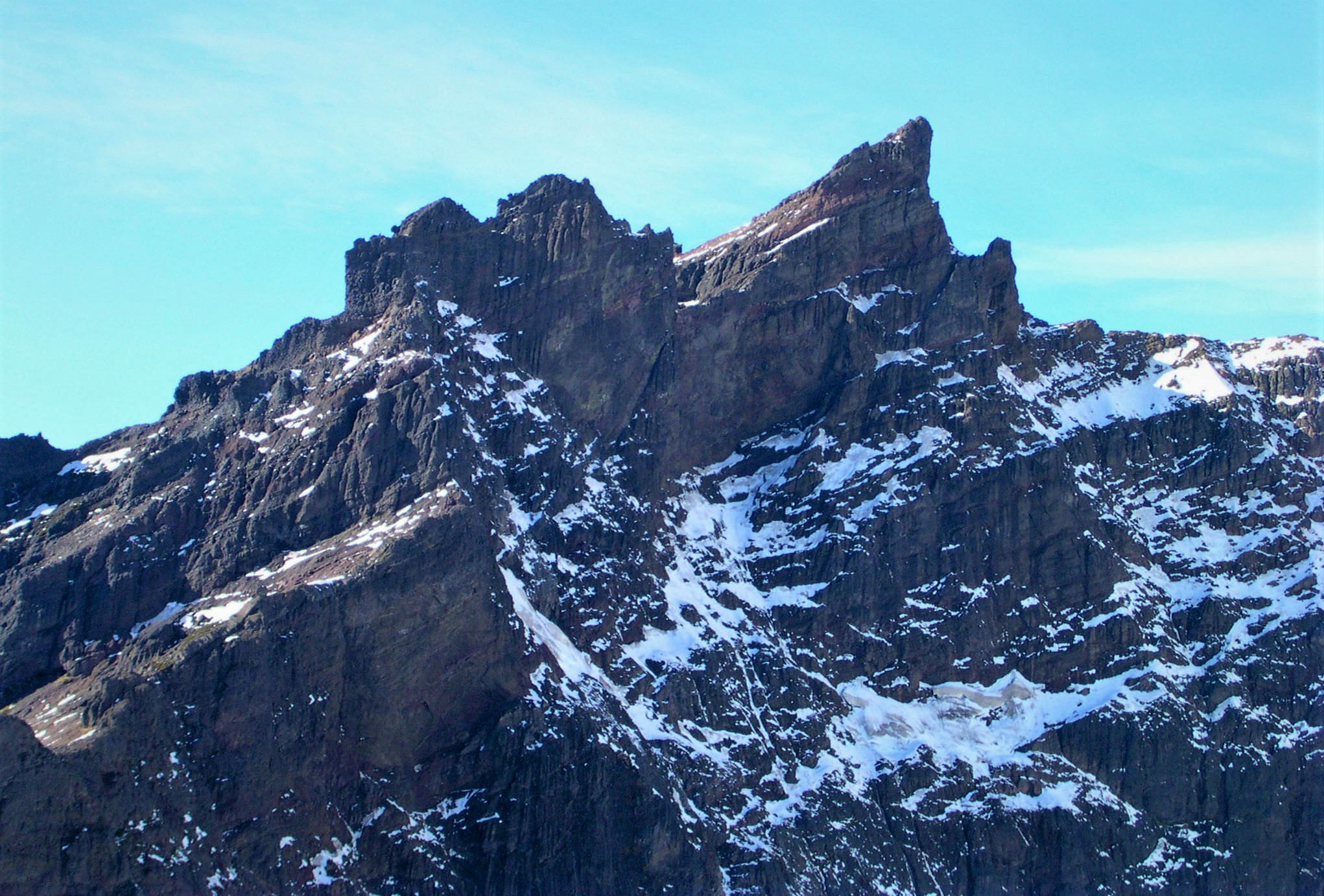
Seward Peak

Seward Peak has an elevation of 8,005 feet (2,440 m), and it lies 0.7 miles (1.1 km) to the west of Lincoln Peak. First ascended by Dallas Kloke and Bryce Simon on July 11, 1973, it does not require a technical climb. Climbers are recommended to approach as though intending to climb Lincoln Peak, but instead to follow heather to the southwestern ridge before ascending a ridge to a false peak. After another 100 feet (30 m) of ascent, they should reach the summit of Seward Peak, the entire trip lasting about 4 hours.

== Geology ==
Black Buttes is an extinct volcano with an amphitheater shape. It consists of jagged peaks that form an arc-shaped ridge, which were shaped and altered by glacial motion and erosion. Part of its amphitheater and its main eruptive crater is currently taken up by Deming Glacier, the rest of the volcano sitting above the glacier.

=== Eruptive history ===
Black Buttes was active during the Middle Pleistocene from 495,000 to 288,000 years ago, producing viscous, andesitic lava flows with a steep dip (the steepest angle of descent of a tilted bed or feature relative to a horizontal plane) that reach thicknesses of up to 1,950 ft (590 m), although they could actually be larger as they are covered by ice. Its most active eruptive period took place between 350,000 and 330,000 years ago.

During the construction of its main edifice, at least four flank eruptions from satellite vents separate from its central crater generated lava flows. The first three eruptions produced andesitic flows, while the fourth and most recent event yielded lava composed of basaltic andesite. Andesite from the Lava Divide era, the first and longest eruptive period which spanned 460,000 to 296,000 years ago, probably produced a large volcanic cone, but it has now been reduced to a ridge. Lava flows made of andesite from 455,000 to 366,000 years ago were generated from a vent now buried under Mount Baker; at least two have subhorizontal columns indicating that they were settled adjacent to ice, likely from a glacier. Some of the lava flows also contain hypersthene basalt.

In addition to these eruptions traced to Black Buttes, there are five lava flows in the vicinity for which geologists have failed to pinpoint the source vent. These deposits were erupted after Black Buttes went extinct, but before Mount Baker became active. They consist of rhyodacite (dated to 199,000 years ago) and basaltic andesite.

== Human history ==
The Black Buttes were named by Edmund T. Coleman during his ascent of Mount Baker in 1868. He named Lincoln and Colfax Peaks, describing them on August 14 of that year as "black, jagged, splintered precipices." Historian Charles Easton referred to the Black Buttes as a "homogenous mass of black basalt", comparing them to "a Chinese wall". Historically, the surveyor Thomas Gerdine called them the Sawtooth Rocks, a name which was used for a number of maps.

== Sources ==
- Beckey, F. (1995). Cascade Alpine Guide: Rainy Pass to Fraser River. The Mountaineers Books. ISBN 978-1594851360.
- Harris, S. L. (2005). "Chapter 20: Mount Baker". Fire Mountains of the West: The Cascade and Mono Lake Volcanoes (3rd ed.). Missoula, Montana: Mountain Press Publishing Company. ISBN 978-0878425112.
- Wood, C. A.; Kienle, J. (1992). Volcanoes of North America. Cambridge University Press. ISBN 978-0521438117.
