= Thunder Glacier (Mount Baker) =

Glacier in Washington, United States

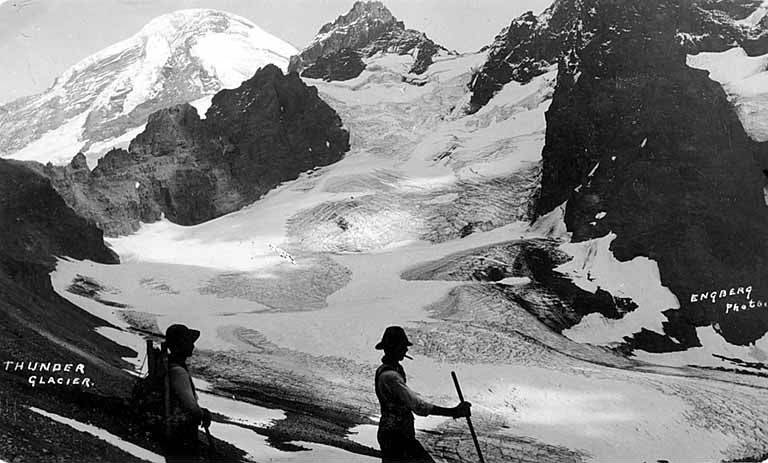
- circa 1909

- Location within Washington (state)
- Type: Mountain glacier
- Location: Whatcom County, Washington, USA
- Coordinates: 48°46′25″N 121°51′47″W
- Length: .90 mi (1.45 km)
- Terminus: Talus/Icefall
- Status: Retreating

Thunder Glacier is located on the west slopes of Mount Baker in the North Cascades of the U.S. state of Washington. The glacier descends to the west on the north side of the Black Buttes.

== See also ==
- List of glaciers in the United States
