= Lower Baker Dam =

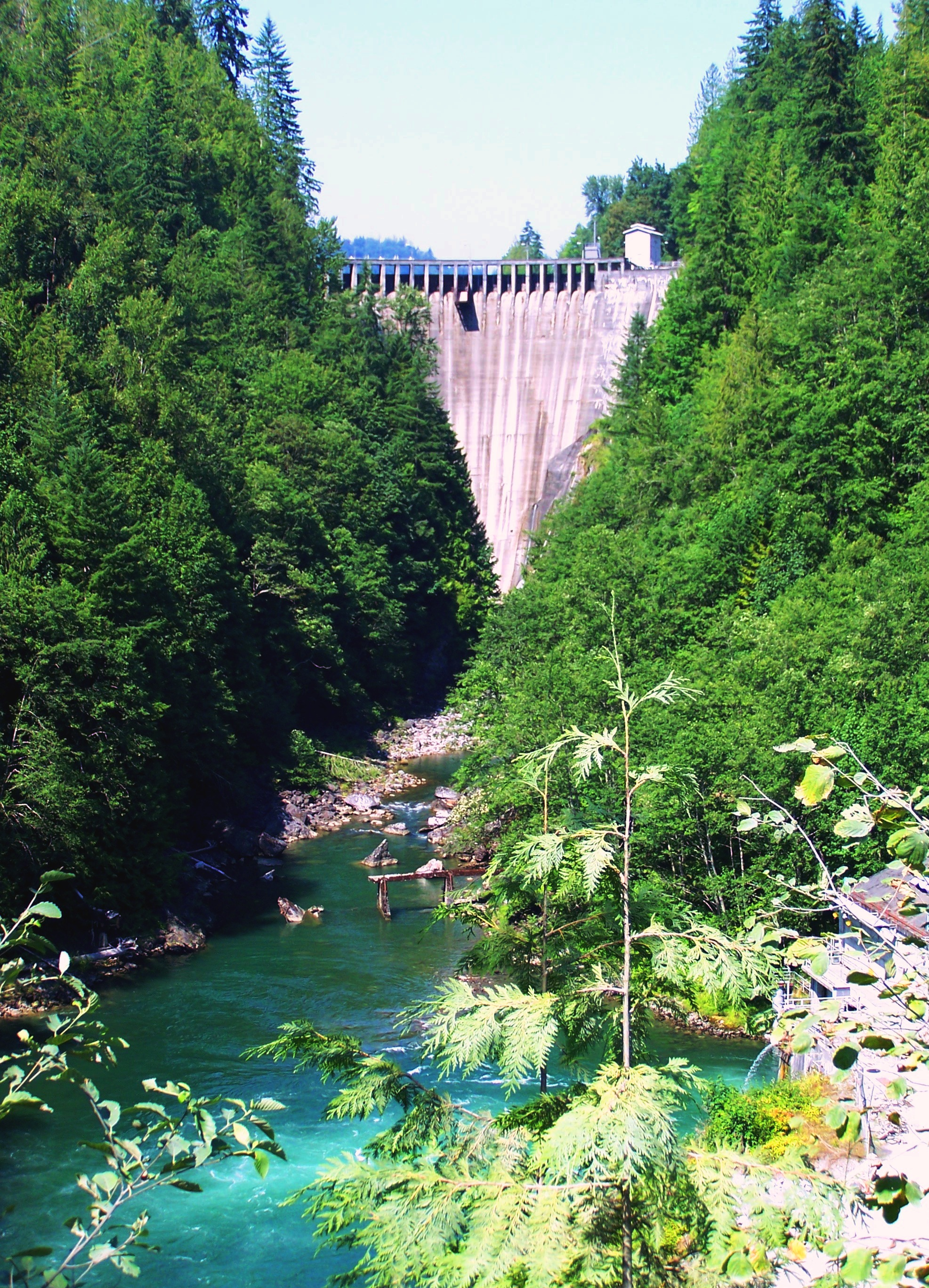
- Lower Baker Dam from downstream
- Interactive map of Lower Baker Dam
- Country: United States
- Location: Skagit County, Washington
- Coordinates: 48°32′51″N 121°44′28″W
- Status: In use
- Opening date: 1925 (Generator 3 Powerhouse); 2013 (Generator 4 Powerhouse)
- Owner: Puget Sound Energy

Dam and spillways
- Type of dam: Concrete thick-arch
- Impounds: Baker River
- Height: 285 feet (87 m)
- Length: 550 feet (170 m)
- Spillway type: Uncontrolled overflow

Reservoir
- Creates: Lake Shannon
- Total capacity: 161,470 acre-feet (199,170,000 m^{3})
- Catchment area: 250 square miles (650 km^{2})
- Surface area: 2,190 acres (890 ha)

Lower Baker Powerhouses
- Commission date: 1925 (Generator 3 Powerhouse); 2013 (Generator 4 Powerhouse)
- Type: Conventional
- Hydraulic head: 280 feet (85 m)
- Turbines: 1x 80.8 MW, 1x 23.1 MW
- Installed capacity: 103.9 MW
- Annual generation: 326.697 GWh(2024)

Lower Baker Dam (or simply Baker Dam) is a dam across the Baker River one mile north of Concrete, Washington. It forms a reservoir called Lake Shannon which stretches 7.5 miles (12.1 km) upstream. The dam is operated by Puget Sound Energy as part of the Baker River Hydroelectric Project.

The dam has a thick arch design, and is 285 feet (87 m) high and 550 feet (170 m) long. It spans the Baker River in a narrow reach known as Eden Canyon, just above the river's confluence with the Skagit River. It is able to hold 161,470 acre-feet (199,170,000 m^{3}) of water, of which 29,426 acre-feet (36,296,000 m^{3}) is reserved for flood control. At full capacity the dam's hydroelectric plant can generate 103.9 megawatts of power. The other dam on this river, Upper Baker Dam, lies about 8 miles (13 km) upstream, and serves a similar purpose to Lower Baker.

== Hydroelectric power capacity ==
Generator	Nameplate Capacity (MW)
3	80.8
4	23.1
Total	103.9
