= Upper Baker Dam =

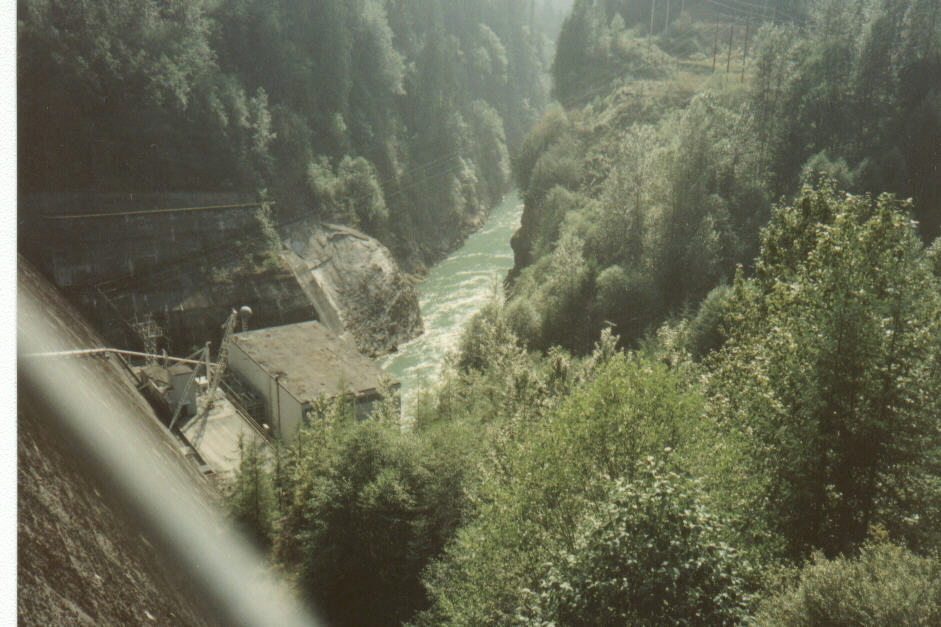
- Interactive map of Upper Baker Dam
- Country: United States
- Location: Whatcom County, Washington
- Coordinates: 48°38′56″N 121°41′27″W
- Status: In use
- Opening date: 1959
- Owner: Puget Sound Energy

Dam and spillways
- Type of dam: Concrete gravity
- Impounds: Baker River
- Height: 312 feet (95 m)
- Length: 1,200 feet (370 m)
- Spillways: 3
- Spillway type: Gate-controlled, service
- Spillway capacity: 90,000 cubic feet per second (2,500 m^{3}/s)

Reservoir
- Creates: Baker Lake
- Total capacity: 285,000 acre-feet (352,000,000 m^{3})
- Catchment area: 215 square miles (560 km^{2})
- Surface area: 4,800 acres (19 km^{2})

Power Station
- Operator: Puget Sound Energy
- Type: Conventional Hydropower
- Turbines: 2x 52.4 MW
- Installed capacity: 104.8 MW
- Annual generation: 317.831 GWh(2024)

Upper Baker Dam is a dam spanning the Baker River in northern Washington in the United States of America. It is one of two dams on the river, the other one being the Lower Baker Dam a few miles downstream. The dam is used to generate hydroelectricity and provide flood control.

Construction of the dam was finished in 1959 by Puget Sound Energy as part of a power generating scheme, the Baker River Hydroelectric Project. The dam is a concrete gravity structure 312 feet (95 m) high and 1,200 feet (370 m) long, and is capable of producing 91 MW. Its reservoir stretches 9 miles (14 km) upstream and contains 285,000 acre-feet (352,000,000 m^{3}) of water.

== Hydroelectric power capacity ==
Generator	Nameplate Capacity (MW)
1	52.4
2	52.4
Total	104.8

== Climate ==
Upper Baker Dam has a mediterranean climate (Köppen Csb).

Climate data for Upper Baker Dam (1991–2020 normals, extremes 1965–present)
Month	Jan	Feb	Mar	Apr	May	Jun	Jul	Aug	Sep	Oct	Nov	Dec	Year
Record high °F (°C)	57 (14)	68 (20)	76 (24)	92 (33)	102 (39)	110 (43)	101 (38)	98 (37)	100 (38)	84 (29)	66 (19)	60 (16)	110 (43)
Mean maximum °F (°C)	46.6 (8.1)	53.2 (11.8)	65.1 (18.4)	75.6 (24.2)	83.4 (28.6)	85.4 (29.7)	90.7 (32.6)	90.4 (32.4)	84.9 (29.4)	71.5 (21.9)	54.2 (12.3)	46.5 (8.1)	93.8 (34.3)
Mean daily maximum °F (°C)	37.9 (3.3)	42.4 (5.8)	47.9 (8.8)	55.8 (13.2)	63.7 (17.6)	67.5 (19.7)	74.4 (23.6)	75.3 (24.1)	68.6 (20.3)	55.7 (13.2)	43.8 (6.6)	37.3 (2.9)	55.9 (13.3)
Daily mean °F (°C)	33.4 (0.8)	35.8 (2.1)	39.9 (4.4)	45.8 (7.7)	52.8 (11.6)	57.2 (14.0)	62.6 (17.0)	63.3 (17.4)	57.9 (14.4)	48.2 (9.0)	39.0 (3.9)	33.6 (0.9)	47.5 (8.6)
Mean daily minimum °F (°C)	28.9 (−1.7)	29.1 (−1.6)	31.8 (−0.1)	35.8 (2.1)	41.9 (5.5)	46.9 (8.3)	50.9 (10.5)	51.3 (10.7)	47.3 (8.5)	40.6 (4.8)	34.2 (1.2)	29.8 (−1.2)	39.0 (3.9)
Mean minimum °F (°C)	18.1 (−7.7)	20.7 (−6.3)	24.7 (−4.1)	29.5 (−1.4)	34.2 (1.2)	40.0 (4.4)	45.1 (7.3)	45.0 (7.2)	39.8 (4.3)	30.8 (−0.7)	24.6 (−4.1)	19.6 (−6.9)	13.3 (−10.4)
Record low °F (°C)	0 (−18)	4 (−16)	10 (−12)	24 (−4)	28 (−2)	35 (2)	39 (4)	39 (4)	30 (−1)	22 (−6)	5 (−15)	−2 (−19)	−2 (−19)
Average precipitation inches (mm)	15.31 (389)	8.80 (224)	10.42 (265)	6.70 (170)	4.52 (115)	3.32 (84)	1.78 (45)	1.92 (49)	4.83 (123)	10.52 (267)	15.97 (406)	14.15 (359)	98.24 (2,496)
Average snowfall inches (cm)	13.1 (33)	10.6 (27)	3.4 (8.6)	0.2 (0.51)	0.0 (0.0)	0.0 (0.0)	0.0 (0.0)	0.0 (0.0)	0.0 (0.0)	0.0 (0.0)	2.2 (5.6)	12.9 (33)	42.4 (107.71)
Average extreme snow depth inches (cm)	11.7 (30)	8.7 (22)	5.6 (14)	0.2 (0.51)	0.0 (0.0)	0.0 (0.0)	0.0 (0.0)	0.0 (0.0)	0.0 (0.0)	0.0 (0.0)	2.4 (6.1)	9.6 (24)	17.3 (44)
Average precipitation days (≥ 0.01 in)	20.8	17.2	20.5	17.8	14.2	13.6	7.0	6.5	11.2	17.4	21.3	20.9	188.4
Average snowy days (≥ 0.1 in)	4.1	3.1	2.4	0.2	0.1	0.0	0.0	0.0	0.0	0.0	1.2	5.5	16.6
Source 1: NOAA
Source 2: National Weather Service
