= Baker Lake (Washington) =

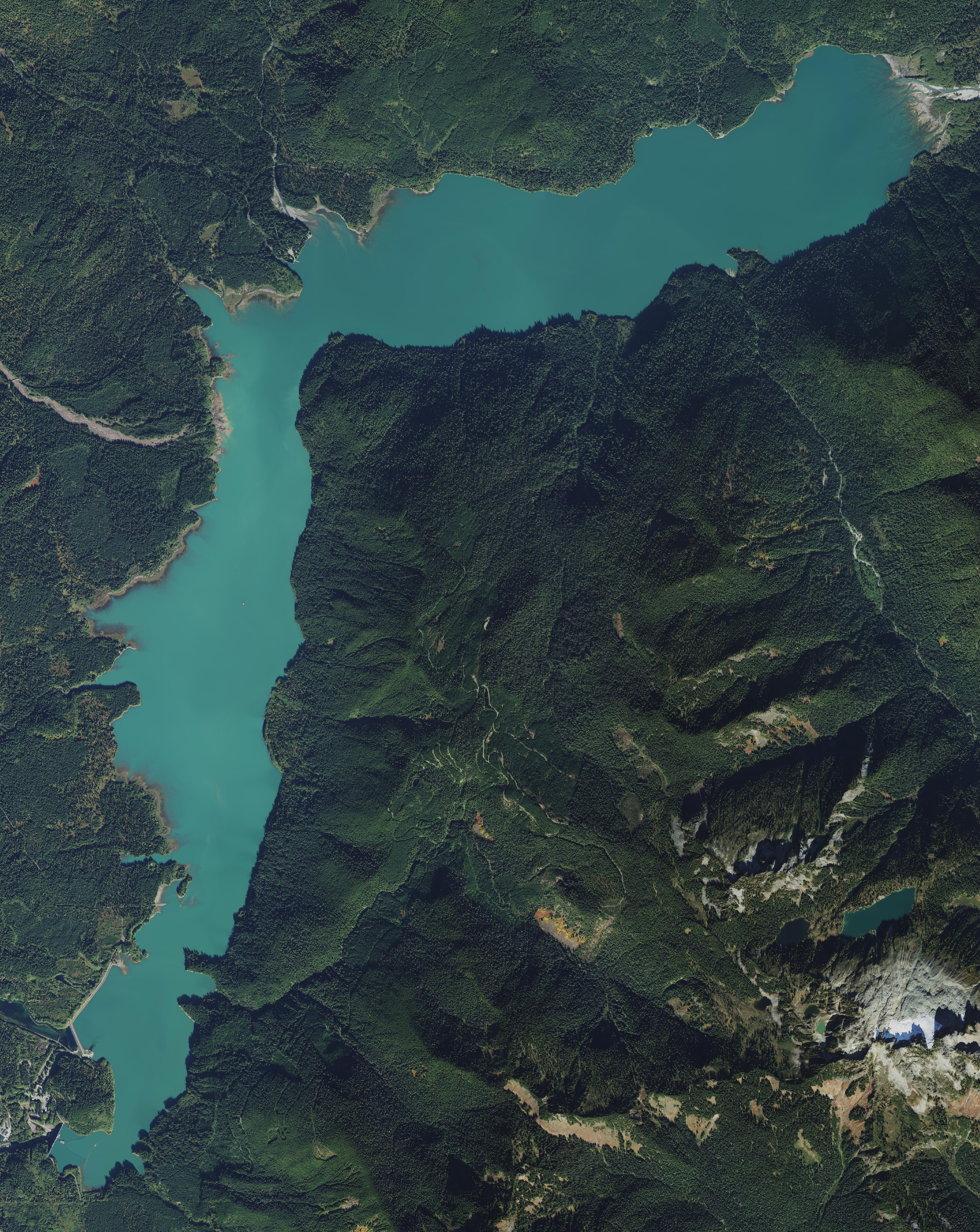
- An aerial photo of Baker Lake in 2016

- Location within Washington (state) Location within the United States
- Coordinates: 48°43′44″N 121°37′45″W
- Type: Reservoir
- Primary inflows: Baker River, Swift Creek, Shannon Creek, Noisy Creek, Park Creek, Anderson Creek, Boulder Creek, Sandy Creek
- Primary outflows: Baker River
- Catchment area: 215 square miles (560 km^{2})
- Basin countries: United States
- Max. length: 9 miles (14 km)
- Max. width: 0.8 miles (1.3 km) max
- Surface area: 4,800 acres (19 km^{2})
- Water volume: 285,000 acre-feet (352,000,000 m^{3})
- Surface elevation: 705 feet (215 m)
- Islands: 3, unnamed

Baker Lake is a lake in northern Washington state in the United States. The lake is situated in the Mount Baker-Snoqualmie National Forest and Baker River valley southwest of North Cascades National Park and is fed by the Baker River along with numerous smaller tributaries. The lake is approximately 10 miles (16 km) north of the town of Concrete, Washington.

The lake covers an area of 4,800 acres (19 km^{2}) and holds up to 285,000 acre-feet (352,000,000 m^{3}) of water. Water levels fluctuate an average of 39 feet (12 m) annually. Formerly a smaller natural body of water, it was enlarged and raised 312 feet (95 m) in 1959 in conjunction with the construction of the Upper Baker Dam, a concrete gravity hydroelectric dam capable of generating 91 megawatts.

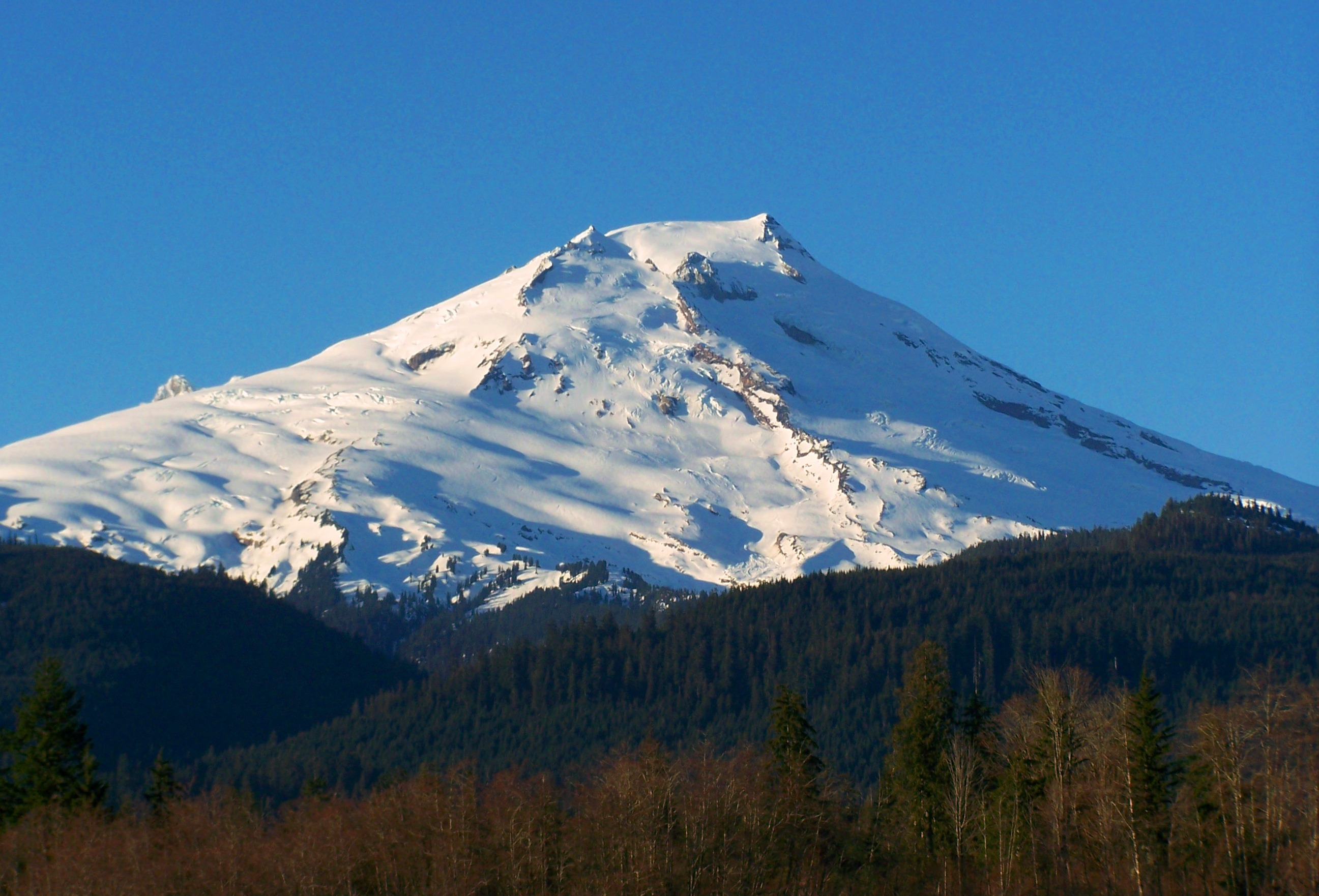
Mount Baker as seen from Baker Lake

Baker Lake is a popular recreational area for fishing, camping, and boating and attracts local residents from adjacent Whatcom and Skagit counties. The Baker Lake area is also home to Swift Creek Campground which features 55 private campsites for tents or RVs, 2 group site as well as a boat ramp and marina. The campground can be found about halfway up on Mt. Baker Lake across from Park Creek. Formerly known as Baker Lake Resort and Tarr's Resort before that. It lies entirely within Mount Baker National Recreation Area.

== See also ==
- Lake Shannon
- List of lakes of Washington
- Skagit River
