= WNP-1 and WNP-4 =

Cancelled nuclear power plant in Washington, United States

WNP-1/4
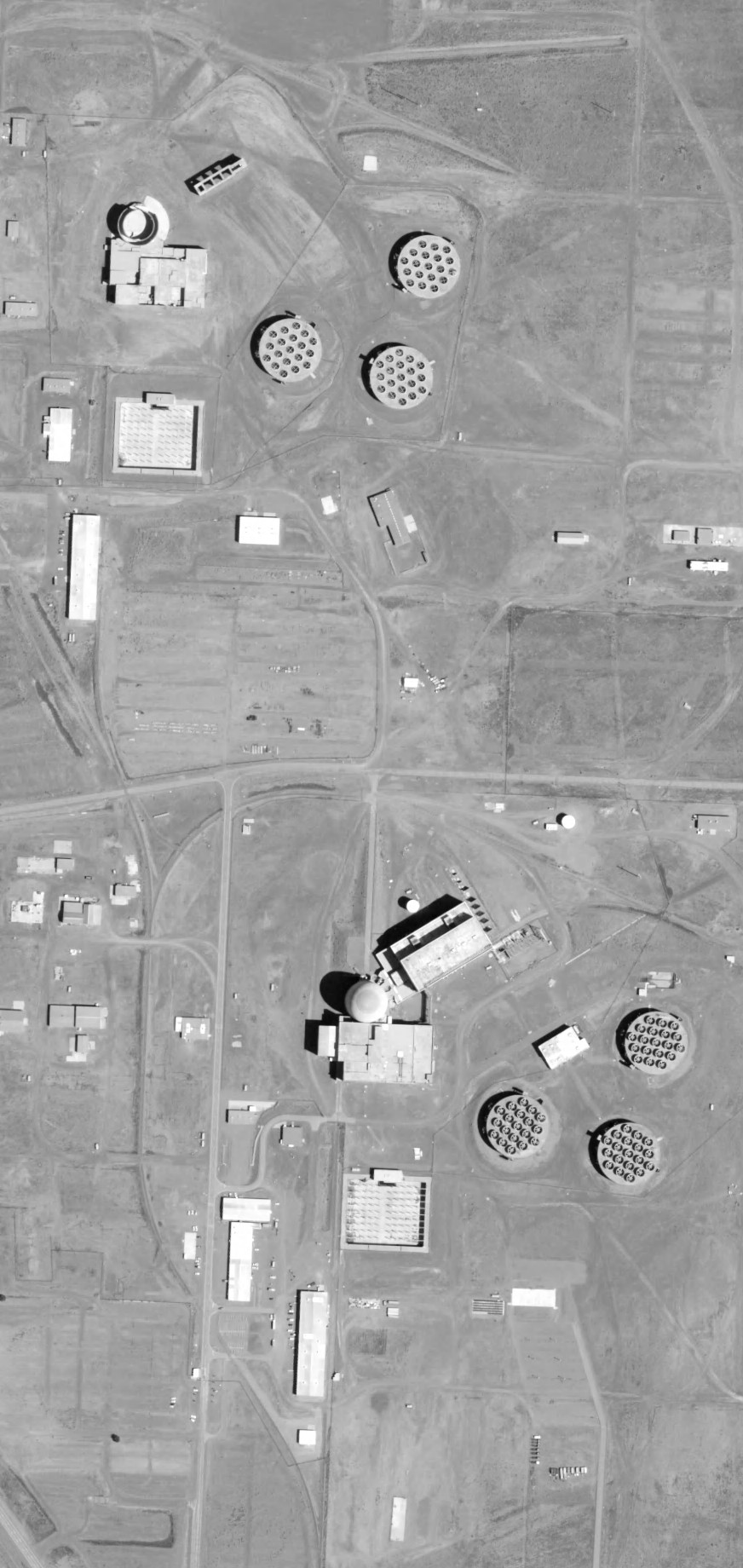
- WNP-1/4 site in 2009, with WNP-1 to the south and WNP-4 to the north. The turbine building extends northeast of the containment, and the auxiliary building extends south of the containment.
- Official name: Nuclear Project Nos. 1 and 4
- Country: United States
- Location: North of Richland, Benton County, Washington
- Coordinates: 46.4715°N 119.3170°W
- Status: Cancelled
- Construction began: 1975
- Commission date: N/A
- Owner: Washington Public Power Supply System

Nuclear power station
- Reactor type: PWR
- Reactor supplier: Babcock & Wilcox

Power generation
- Units cancelled: 1 × 1259 MW; 1 × 1250 MW

External links
- Commons: Related media on Commons

Washington Nuclear Project Nos. 1 and 4, abbreviated as WNP-1 and WNP-4 were two of the five nuclear power plants on which construction was started by the Washington Public Power Supply System (WPPSS) in order to meet projected electricity demand in the Pacific Northwest. WNP-1, WNP-2 and WNP-3 were part of the original 1968 plan, with WNP-4 (a twin to WNP-1 and located at the same site) and WNP-5 (a twin to WNP-3, in similar fashion) added in the early 1970s.

WNP-1 and -4 are located on 972 acres (393 ha), within the boundaries of the Hanford Reservation in the U.S. state of Washington, approximately 1.5 miles (2.4 km) east of the Columbia Generating Station. The WNP-1 site has been selected as a location for small modular reactors: Washington Xe-100 reactor site.

== History ==
The Site Certification Agreement was approved in 1975, with construction commencing on both units later that year. Labor disputes at Hanford halted construction on WNP-1, -2 and -4 in 1980 and the forecast electric demand had failed to materialize, prompting WPPSS to install new management and re-evaluate the cost and schedule for all five nuclear projects. In 1982, the Bonneville Power Administration, which had encouraged and was responsible for funding the construction of the initial three projects, had to decide between shutting down construction on WNP-1 or WNP-3. Construction continued on WNP-3 since WNP-3 was partly owned by public utilities and was slightly ahead of schedule, and WNP-1 entered an extended construction delay in April 1982 when it was approximately 63% complete.

Equipment and structures at WNP-1 were preserved to enable the resumption of construction at a later date, based on regional energy forecasts showing surplus power generation would disappear by 1990, but preservation was terminated in 1995. However, the low humidity has maintained the structures in a reasonable condition. The co-owners of WNP-4 and WNP-5 planned to fund similar preservation measures for a potential construction restart, but could not agree on funding obligations, and WNP-4 was canceled in January 1982 at approximately 24% complete.

With the shutdown of the nearby N-Reactor in 1987, a Department of Energy proposal to complete and convert WNP-1 to a tritium-producing reactor for the production of nuclear weapons materials was advanced. Senator Brock Adams and Representative Sid Morrison commissioned reports detailing the issues involved. Public reaction to the conversion proposal was mostly negative. WPPSS advanced a separate proposal to convert both WNP-1 and WNP-2 to dispose of highly enriched uranium and plutonium by using it as mixed-oxide fuel.

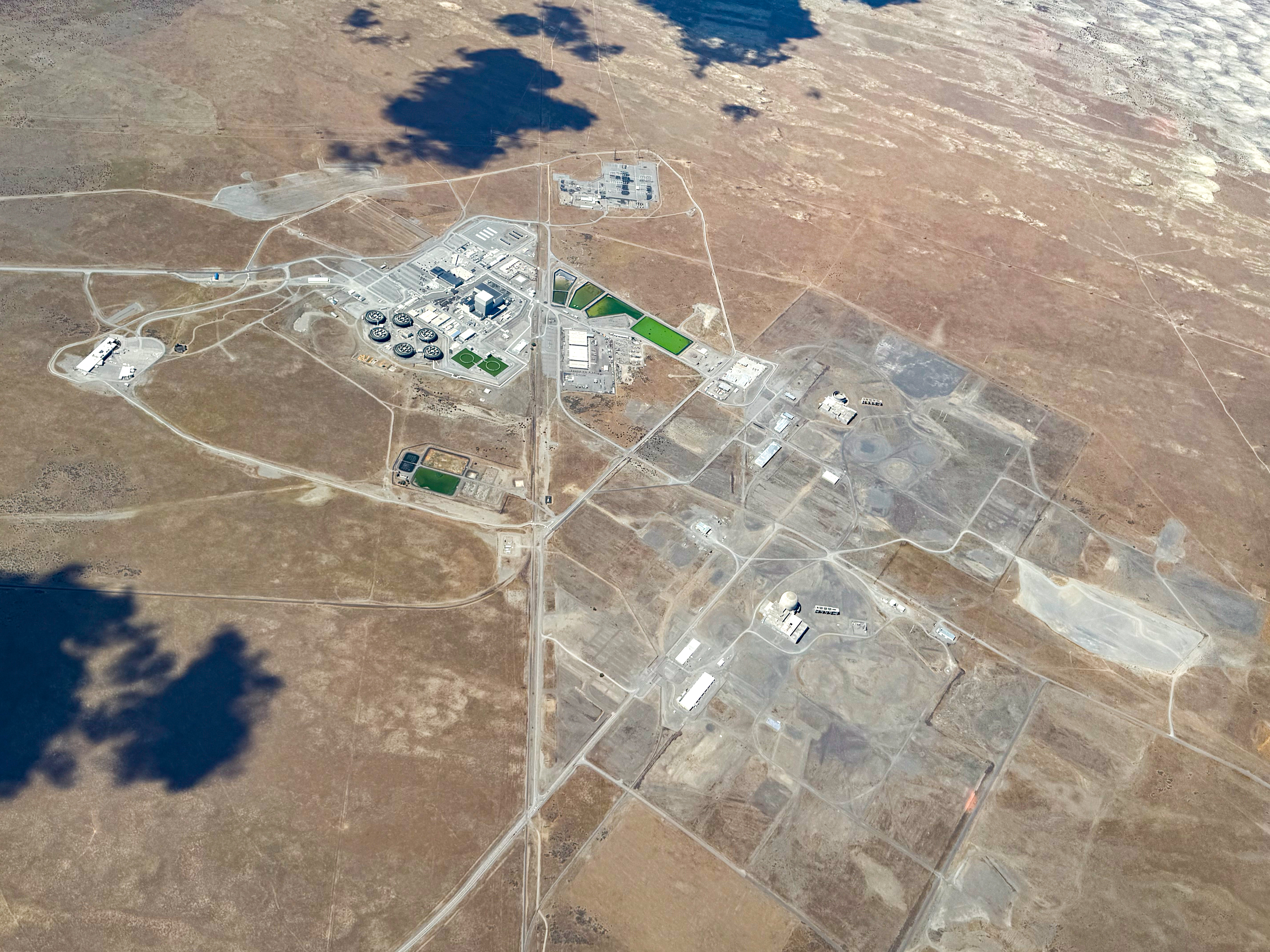
WNP-1, WNP-4, and the Columbia Generating Station

WPPSS's successor, Energy Northwest, submitted a revised site restoration plan in 1999 proposing several different alternative levels of restoration, ranging from putting a fence around the incomplete units to full demolition of all structures. Under EFSEC Resolution No. 302, a revised 'Level 3D' restoration is acceptable, which retains major structures such as the containment, turbine pedestal and auxiliary building. The final agreed-upon restoration adopts a two-phase site restoration, which retains major structures and utility infrastructure for potential reuse in the near-term. The containment building at WNP-1 is slated to be retained, but the containment at WNP-4 will be demolished to approximately 25 feet above grade and sealed with a concrete cap in the long term.

In 2001, regional electricity shortages led to Energy Northwest's withdrawal of a request to terminate the construction permit for WNP-1. Instead, Energy Northwest commissioned a series of studies regarding the feasibility of restarting construction on WNP-1 and in 2002, the NRC extended construction permit CPPR-134 for WNP-1 to 2011, pending study results. These studies included one by Bechtel for a cost- and time-to-complete analysis, another study by R. W. Beck to independently assess Bechtel's methodology, a study by the Energy Northwest senior management team, and an industrial/political feasibility study by the lobbying group Goldschmidt-Imeson, which was founded by former Oregon governor Neil Goldschmidt. The studies concluded that restarting construction on WNP-1 was technically feasible but not cost-effective, with cost of completion estimated at US$4,200,000,000 (equivalent to $7,636,700,000 in 2025). As a result, Energy Northwest requested termination of the construction license, which was received on February 8, 2007. All of the valuable metals inside the buildings were sold as scrap and restoration to brown field conditions was completed as of 2022.

In late 2020 the federal government awarded two $80 million initial fundings to build the TerraPower and X-energy reactors at sites 4 and 1 respectively within the next 5 to 7 years. In 2021 Terrapower instead announced that its first Natrium reactor would be built in Wyoming. In 2023 X-energy announced continued development of up to 12 reactors at the Hanford site. In October 2024 Amazon has signed an agreement to pay for the initial feasibility phase to further develop the X-energy modular reactors near this site. Under current plans, the first modules in Washington could be generating power by 2031 or 2032, said Bob Schuetz, Energy Northwest chief executive officer.

== Design ==
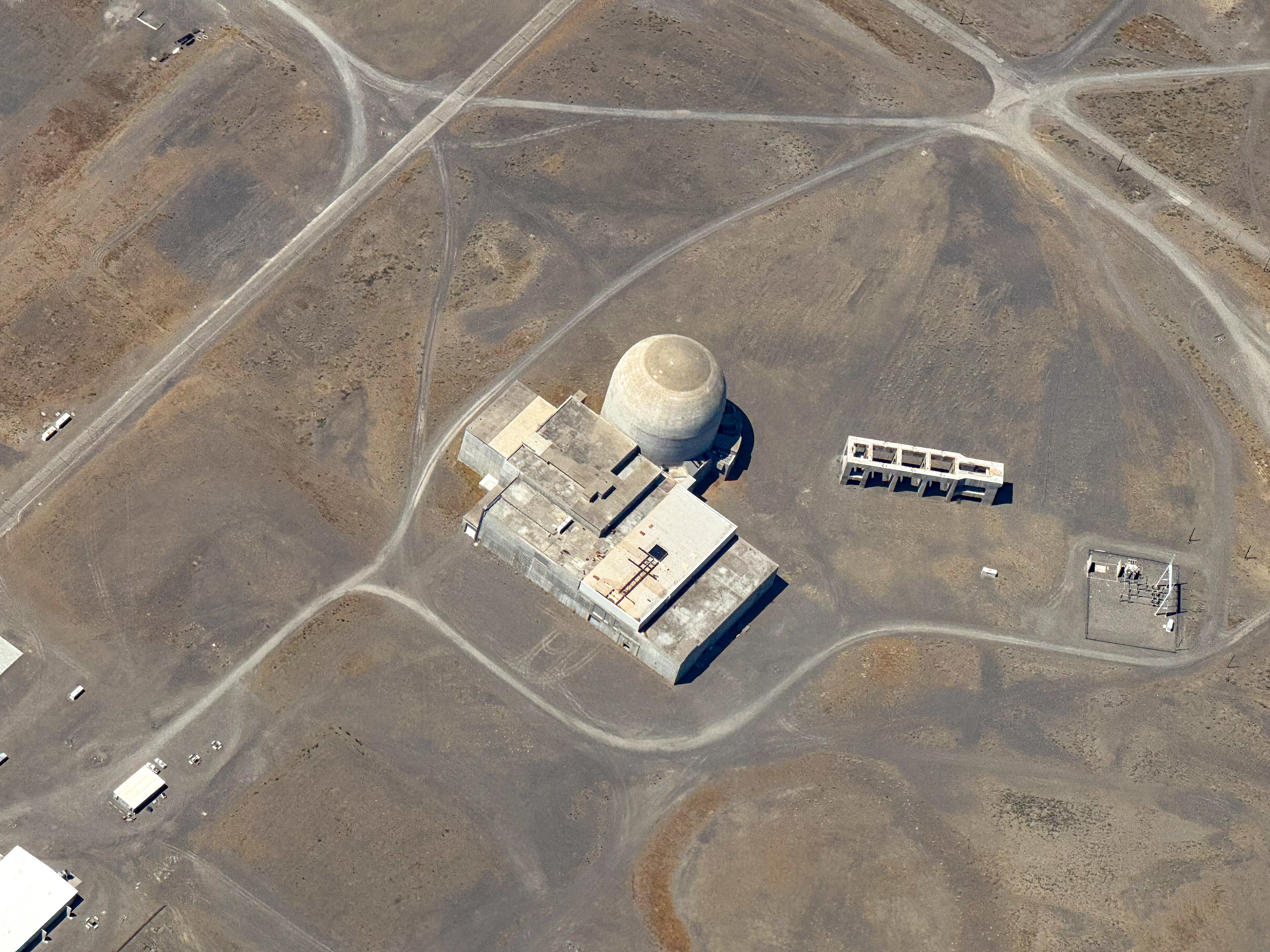
WNP-4 in 2025

The pressurized water reactor nuclear steam supply system (NSSS) for WNP-1 and -4 was being manufactured by Babcock & Wilcox. The B&W 205 design was ordered for WNP-1 and -4 as well as for the two units at Bellefonte Nuclear Generating Station and Mülheim-Kärlich Nuclear Plant, but only Mülheim-Kärlich was completed. Elements of the design are similar to earlier B&W NSSSes installed at Davis Besse, ANO-1, Crystal River 3, Three Mile Island, Oconee and Rancho Seco.

WNP-1/4 would have received make-up water from the adjacent Columbia River and was equipped with forced-draft low-profile cooling towers and a spray pond.

== Skagit/Hanford ==
WNP-1/4 and WNP-2 (now Columbia Generating Station) should not be confused with the proposed Skagit/Hanford plant. Skagit/Hanford was a proposal advanced by a consortium of utilities led by Puget Sound Power & Light (40% share) and joined by Portland General Electric (30%), Pacific Light and Power (20%) and Washington Water Power (10%) to build a two-unit plant north of Seattle in the Skagit Valley. The Skagit site was directly above a major earthquake fault. After the Three Mile Island accident in 1979, Skagit County voters forced the consortium to relocate the proposed Skagit plant to the Hanford site. Skagit/Hanford had not progressed beyond the initial engineering design phases before the plant was scuttled. A 1978 Battelle Northwest report stated the Hanford site could support twenty or more nuclear reactors.

== See also ==
- List of nuclear reactors
