= List of public utility districts in Washington =

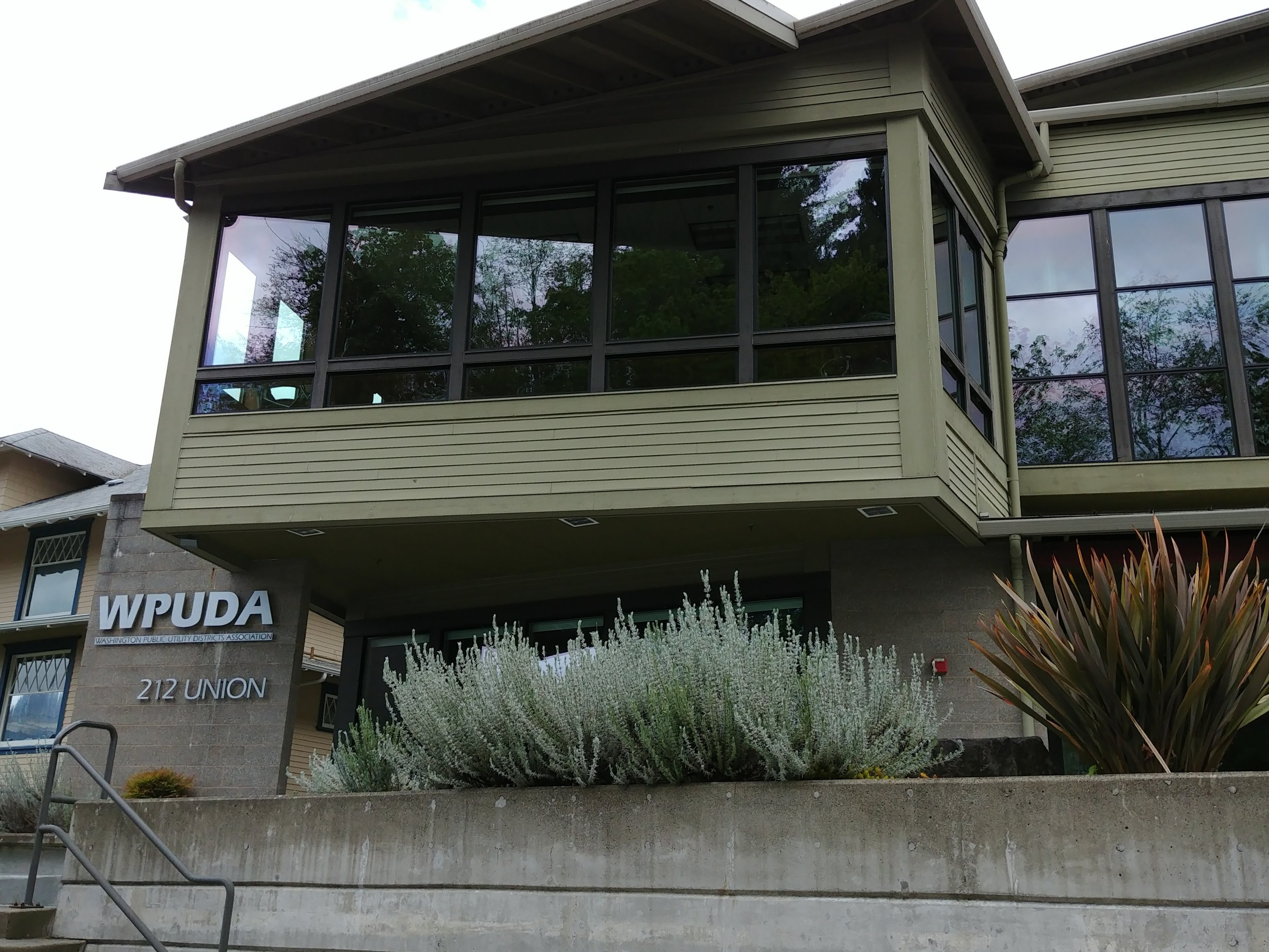
Washington PUD Association building in Olympia

Public utility districts (PUDs) in the U.S. state of Washington serve about one million of the state's electric customers in 26 counties. Public utility districts are regulated by Title 54 of the Revised Code of Washington. Most PUDs provide electricity; some provide other services in addition. The first PUD was Mason No. 1, created by voters on November 6, 1934, serving as of 2017 fewer than 5,000 customers.

- Asotin County Public Utility District
- Benton County Public Utility District
- Chelan County Public Utility District
- Clallam County Public Utility District
- Clark Public Utilities
- Cowlitz County Public Utility District
- Douglas County Public Utility District
- Ferry County Public Utility District
- Franklin County Public Utility District
- Grant County Public Utility District
- Grays Harbor County Public Utility District
- Jefferson County Public Utility District
- Kitsap County Public Utility District (water and telecommunications only)
- Kittitas County Public Utility District
- Klickitat County Public Utility District
- Lewis County Public Utility District
- Mason County Public Utility District No. 1
- Mason County Public Utility District No. 3
- Okanogan County Public Utility District
- Pacific County Public Utility District
- Pend Oreille County Public Utility District
- Skagit County Public Utility District (water, sewer, telecommunications only)
- Skamania County Public Utility District
- Snohomish County Public Utility District
- Stevens County Public Utility District (water and sewer only)
- Thurston County Public Utility District (water only)
- Wahkiakum County Public Utility District
- Whatcom County Public Utility District

== See also ==
- Energy Northwest, a PUD consortium
