= Cascade Advanced Energy Facility =

Proposed nuclear power station

- Country: United States
- Location: Benton County, near Richland, Washington
- Coordinates: 46.466°N 119.313°W
- Status: Proposed
- Owner: Energy Northwest
- Operator: Energy Northwest

Nuclear power station
- Reactor type: HTGR
- Reactor supplier: X-energy

Power generation
- Make and model: Xe-100
- Units planned: 12 × 80 MW
- Nameplate capacity: 960 MW total

The Cascade Advanced Energy Facility is a proposed nuclear power plant, to be located near the Columbia Generating Station in the state of Washington by the 2030s. Developed in partnership with Amazon, the site would house up to 12 Xe-100 small modular reactors designed by X-energy. It would be X-energy's second power plant after the Long Mott Generating Station due to be finished by 2030.

The operator will be Energy Northwest, the operator of Columbia Generating Station, the only nuclear power station in the Pacific Northwest. As of 2026, X-energy was engaged in pre-application activities with the Nuclear Regulatory Commission, but had not applied for a construction permit.

== History ==
X-energy had previously considered the site for deployment of 4 Xe-100 units of X-energy's 80 MW_{e} Xe-100 small modular reactor under the Department of Energy's Advanced Reactor Demonstration Program, and signed a memorandum of understanding with Energy Northwest to develop the project. However, the company chose to construct the units in partnership with Dow Chemical Company at the Long Mott Generating Station in Texas.

Energy Northwest and X-energy signed an agreement in July 2023 for the deployment of up to 12 Xe-100 modules at the Washington site. On October 16, 2024, Amazon.com announced it would fund the construction of four Xe-100 reactors, in partnership with Energy Northwest and X-energy, due to the increased electricity demand from the AI boom. The project was named the Cascade Advanced Energy Facility. Amazon also committed to fund the deployment of up to 5 GW of Xe-100 reactors. The project was expected to begin construction by 2030, with operations commencing in the mid-2030s.

== Opposition ==
The site is opposed by environmental groups including the Oregon Conservancy Foundation, who oppose new small modular reactors in general.
