= Bonneville Power Administration =

United States federal agency that provides power supply to the Pacific Northwest

Agency overview
- Formed: August 20, 1937; 89 years ago
- Jurisdiction: U.S. government
- Headquarters: Portland, Oregon, U.S.
- Agency executive: Travis Kavulla, administrator
- Parent agency: U.S. Department of Energy
- Website: www.bpa.gov

The Bonneville Power Administration (BPA) is a United States federal government agency operating in the Pacific Northwest. BPA was created by an act of Congress in 1937 to market electric power from the Bonneville Dam located on the Columbia River and to construct facilities necessary to transmit that power. Congress has since designated Bonneville to be the marketing agent for power from all of the federally owned hydroelectric projects in the Pacific Northwest. Bonneville is one of four regional Federal power marketing agencies within the U.S. Department of Energy (DOE).

Map of the BPA service area (green) with facilities: BPA transmission lines Non-BPA lines Federal dam

Logo used to commemorate 75 years of the Bonneville Power Administration.

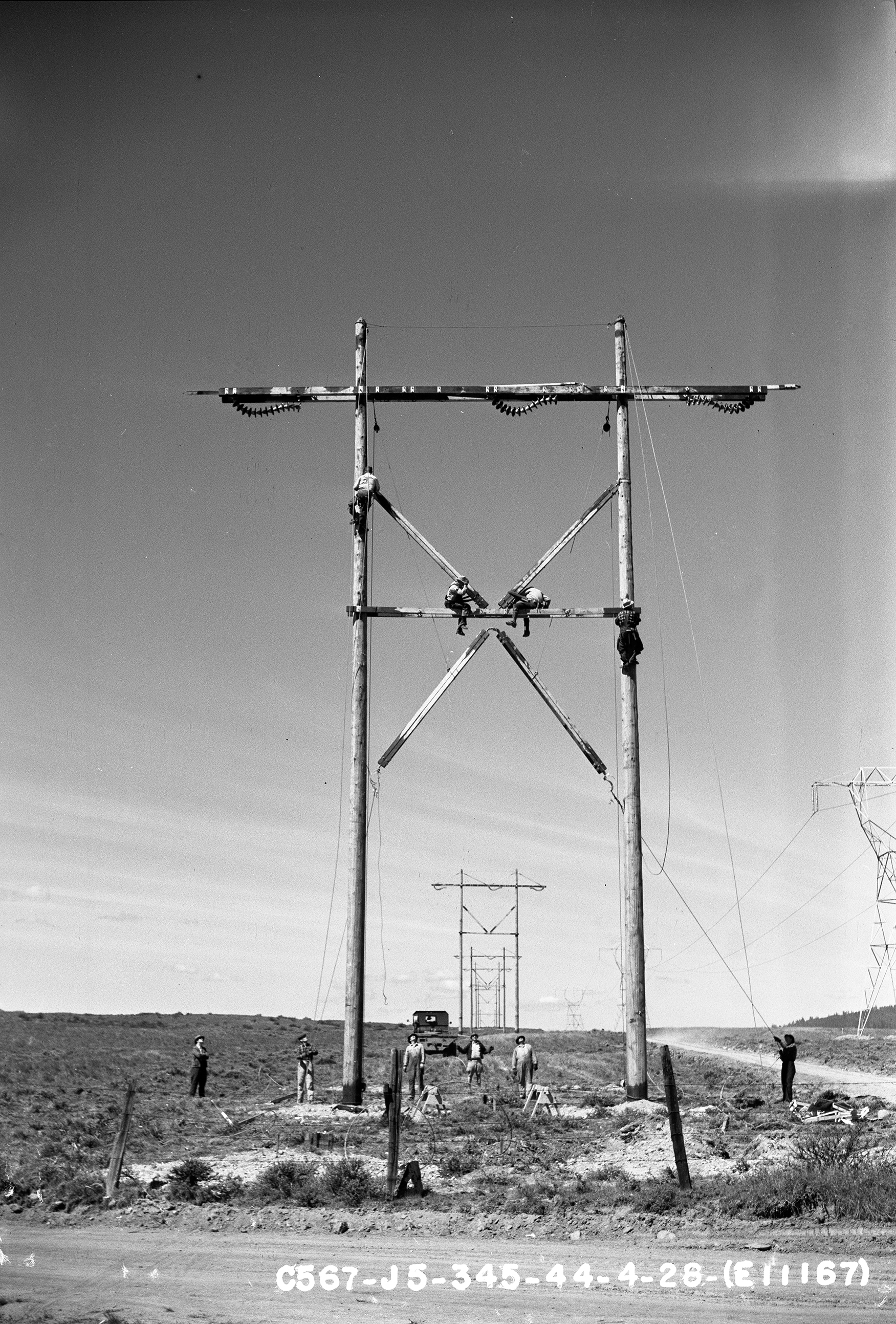
Construction of high voltage line

High voltage transmission right-of-way cleared for construction

Linemen installing high-voltage insulators

Construction of high voltage pylon

Spanning wires

== Operations ==
The power generated on BPA's grid is sold to public utilities, private utilities, and industry on the grid. The excess is sold to other grids in Canada, California and other regions. Because BPA is a public entity, it does not make a profit on power sales or from providing transmission services. BPA also coordinates with the U.S. Army Corps of Engineers and the U.S. Bureau of Reclamation to regulate flow of water in the Columbia River and to carry out environmental projects such as salmon restoration.

Although BPA is part of the DOE, it is self-funded and covers its costs by selling its products and services at cost. The BPA provides about 28% of the electricity used in the region. BPA transmits and sells wholesale electricity in eight western states: Washington, Oregon, Idaho, Montana, Wyoming, Utah, Nevada, and California. Its minimum wholesale rate is 3.49 cents per kilowatt-hour; the BPA generated $4.72 billion in operating revenue in 2022.

BPA now markets the electricity from thirty-one federal hydroelectric dams on the Columbia River and its tributaries, as well as from the Columbia Generating Station, a nuclear plant located on the Hanford Site in eastern Washington. BPA has more than 15,000 circuit miles (24,140 circuit km) of electrical lines and 261 substations in the Pacific Northwest and controls approximately 75 percent of the high-voltage (230 kV and higher) transmission capacity in the region. 87 percent of the agency's sustained peak capacity (11,680 MW) is generated from hydroelectricity.

BPA also maintains connection lines with other power grids. It connects to the California high-voltage transmission system by Path 66, which consists of the two 500 kV AC lines of the Pacific AC Intertie, plus a third 500 kV AC line of the California-Oregon Transmission Project (COTP) (managed by the Balancing Authority of Northern California). Together these three lines are operated as the California-Oregon Intertie (COI) (managed by the California Independent System Operator CAISO). An additional DC ±500 kV line, the Pacific DC Intertie, links BPA's grid at the Celilo Converter Station near The Dalles, Oregon to the Los Angeles Department of Water and Power (LADWP) grid 800 miles (1,300 km) away at the Sylmar Converter Station in Los Angeles.

The Northern Intertie crosses the Canada–US border in two locations at Blaine, Washington and Nelway, British Columbia and connects to two BC Hydro AC 500 kV lines and several lower voltage lines.

Because BPA owns and operates transmission equipment and locations, its workers perform its own vegetation management.

BPA uses helicopters to sling load maintenance workers inspecting and repairing power lines.

== Facilities and projects ==
The BPA is the designated marketer for 31 hydroelectric dams and the Columbia Generating Station, a nuclear power plant at the Hanford Site. The dams are owned and operated by either the Army Corps of Engineers (21 dams) or the Bureau of Reclamation (10 dams).

Bonneville Power Administration dams
Dam	River	State(s)	Maximum capacity	Year opened	Owner
Albeni Falls Dam	Pend Oreille	Idaho	49 MW	1955	Army Corps of Engineers
Anderson Ranch Dam	Boise	Idaho	40 MW	1950	Bureau of Reclamation
Big Cliff Dam	North Santiam	Oregon	23 MW	1953	Army Corps of Engineers
Black Canyon Diversion Dam	Payette	Idaho	10 MW	1925	Bureau of Reclamation
Boise River Diversion Dam	Boise	Idaho	3 MW	1912	Bureau of Reclamation
Bonneville Dam	Columbia	Oregon, Washington	1,216 MW	1938	Army Corps of Engineers
Chandler Dam	Yakima	Washington	12 MW	1956	Bureau of Reclamation
Chief Joseph Dam	Columbia	Washington	2,614 MW	1958	Army Corps of Engineers
Cougar Dam	McKenzie	Oregon	28 MW	1963	Army Corps of Engineers
Detroit Dam	North Santiam	Oregon	126 MW	1953	Army Corps of Engineers
Dexter Dam	Middle Fork Willamette	Oregon	17 MW	1954	Army Corps of Engineers
Dworshak Dam	Clearwater	Idaho	460 MW	1973	Army Corps of Engineers
Foster Dam	South Santiam	Oregon	23 MW	1967	Army Corps of Engineers
Grand Coulee Dam	Columbia	Washington	7,049 MW	1942	Bureau of Reclamation
Green Peter Dam	South Santiam	Oregon	92 MW	1967	Army Corps of Engineers
Green Springs Dam	Emigrant Creek	Oregon	17 MW	1960	Bureau of Reclamation
Hills Creek Dam	Middle Fork Willamette	Oregon	34 MW	1962	Army Corps of Engineers
Hungry Horse Dam	Flathead	Montana	428 MW	1953	Bureau of Reclamation
Ice Harbor Dam	Snake	Washington	695 MW	1962	Army Corps of Engineers
John Day Dam	Columbia	Oregon, Washington	2,484 MW	1971	Army Corps of Engineers
Libby Dam	Kootenai	Montana	605 MW	1975	Army Corps of Engineers
Little Goose Dam	Snake	Washington	930 MW	1970	Army Corps of Engineers
Lookout Point Dam	Middle Fork Willamette	Oregon	138 MW	1953	Army Corps of Engineers
Lost Creek Dam	Rogue	Oregon	56 MW	1977	Army Corps of Engineers
Lower Granite Dam	Snake	Washington	930 MW	1975	Army Corps of Engineers
Lower Monumental Dam	Snake	Washington	930 MW	1969	Army Corps of Engineers
McNary Dam	Columbia	Oregon, Washington	1,127 MW	1952	Army Corps of Engineers
Minidoka Dam	Snake	Idaho	28 MW	1909	Bureau of Reclamation
Palisades Dam	Snake	Idaho	176 MW	1958	Bureau of Reclamation
Roza Dam	Yakima	Washington	13 MW	1958	Bureau of Reclamation
The Dalles Dam	Columbia	Oregon, Washington	2,048 MW	1957	Army Corps of Engineers

== History ==
The Bonneville Project, named for the then-new Bonneville Dam, was established by an act of Congress that was signed into law by President Franklin D. Roosevelt on August 20, 1936. The federal agency was created to market electricity from the Bonneville and Grand Coulee dams based on the model of the Tennessee Valley Authority (TVA). It would provide a flat rate for customer utilities and use revenue from these sales to pay off the bonds used by the federal government to finance the construction of dams in the Pacific Northwest. The agency's name was changed to the Bonneville Power Administration in 1940. Attempts to replace the BPA with a Columbia Valley Authority that more closely resembled the TVA were made in the 1940s and 1950s, but were ultimately unsuccessful.

BPA's first industrial sale was to Alcoa in January 1940, to provide 32,500 kilowatts of power. This, and the following 162,500 kilowatt order, led to complaints of the Bonneville Power Act's anti-monopoly clause. The cheap price of aluminum from Alcoa helped aluminum sales grow in the post-World War II market.

Overly optimistic estimates of future electricity consumption by BPA in the 1960s led the agency to guarantee some bonds for the disastrous Washington Public Power Supply System nuclear power project. Out of five nuclear power plants started (WNP-1 and WNP-4, WNP-3 and WNP-5), only WNP-2 was completed. BPA is still making payments on three of the abandoned plants. In 2003, BPA's debt for the nuclear project totaled $6.2 billion.

In 1973, the BPA commissioned TRW Inc. to write software for the PDP-10 mainframe computer that managed the agency's power grid; Bill Gates and Paul Allen wrote the software for the monitoring system, which remained in operation until its replacement in 2013.

In 2014, the BPA Library discovered a collection of old films made by the agency and began posting digital versions of them on the agency's website. Included in the collection is the award-winning documentary "River of Power" which covers the Agency's history from its beginning to the present.

The BPA gives its name to the BPA Trail in Federal Way, Washington, a walking trail built beneath power transmission lines.

In 2025, the BPA was impacted by mass firings of federal workers by the Department of Government Efficiency.

=== Administrators ===
Administrators of the Bonneville Power Administration
Administrator (Note: The position title varied in the early years as shown in the reference; since William Pearl, the title has consistently been 'Administrator of the Bonneville Power Administration'.)	Dates (Note: The start date shown is the earliest date when the person was named to the position or when showed up for the job. The "effective" appointment date wasn't always precise but was always after the date of announcement, and sometimes before and sometimes after the date the individual actually began work on the job. Likewise, the swearing-in date was sometimes before and sometimes after the start of actual work in the position.)
James D. (J. D.) Ross (Note: Power administrator of the Bonneville Project)	Oct. 10, 1937 – March 14, 1939
Charles Carey	Feb. 2 – May 4, 1939 (acting) (Note: During Ross' illness and after his death)
Frank Banks	May 4 – Sept. 15, 1939 (interim / acting)
Paul J. Raver (Note: Administrator, Bonneville Power Project, later Bonneville Power Administration)	Sept. 16, 1939 – Jan. 14, 1954
William A. Pearl	Jan. 15, 1954 – Feb. 14, 1961
Charles F. Luce	Feb. 15, 1961 – Aug. 30, 1966
David S. Black	Aug. 31, 1966 – Sept. 7, 1967
H.R. Richmond	Sept. 8, 1967 – Oct. 19, 1967 (acting)
Donald P. Hodel	Dec. 1, 1972 – Dec. 19, 1977
S. Sterling Munro, Jr.	Jan. 1978 – Feb. 1981
Earl Gjelde	Feb. – May 1981 (acting)
Peter T. Johnson	May 1981 – July 1986
James J. Jura	July 1986 – Aug. 1991
Jack Robertson	Aug. – Oct. 1991 (acting)
Randall W. Hardy	Oct. 1991 – Sept. 1997
Jack Robertson	Oct. 1997 – June 1998 (acting)
Judith A. Johansen	June 1998 – Sept. 2000
Stephen J. Wright	Sept. 2000 – Feb. 2002 (acting); March 2002 – Feb. 2013
William K. Drummond	Jan. 2013 – Jan. 2014
Elliot Mainzer	July 2013 – Jan. 2014 (acting); Jan. 2014 – Sept. 2020
John L. Hairston	Sept 2020 - Mar. 2021 (acting); Mar. 2021 – present

== See also ==
- BPA Trail, Federal Way
- Power Marketing Administration
- Tennessee Valley Authority
- Western Interconnection

== Archives ==
- Charles F. Luce papers. 1654–2000. 6.13 cubic feet.
- Brock Adams papers. 1947–1993. 326.64 cubic feet (456 boxes).
- George H. Barker Collection of Dam Construction Photographs and Ephemera. 1935–1952. 243 photographic prints, 18 newspaper clippings (1 box).
- Bonneville Power Administration Series, Otto Sternoff Beyer Papers, Manuscript Division, Library of Congress, Washington, D.C.
