= WPPS =

WPPS may refer to:

- WPPS-LP, a low-power radio station (92.9 FM) licensed to serve Oconto Falls, Wisconsin, United States
- Energy Northwest
