= Columbia Generating Station =

Nuclear energy facility in Washington, US

Columbia Nuclear Generating Station
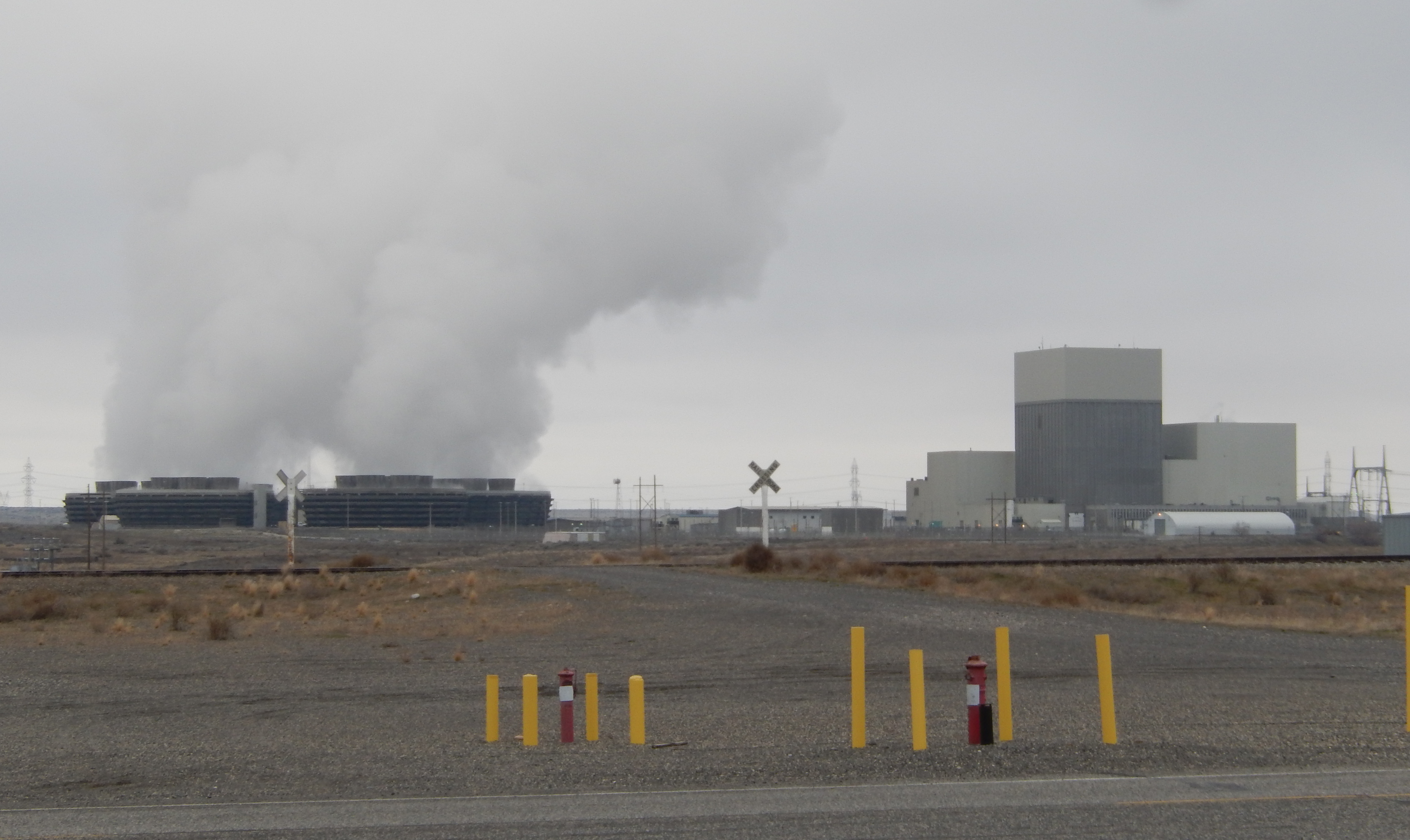
- Columbia Generating Station and low-draft cooling towers in 2015
- Country: United States
- Location: Benton County, near Richland, Washington
- Coordinates: 46°28′16″N 119°20′2″W
- Status: Operational
- Construction began: August 1, 1972
- Commission date: December 13, 1984 (41 years ago)
- Construction cost: $6.392 billion (2007 USD) ($9.29 billion in 2024 dollars)
- Owner: Energy Northwest
- Operator: Energy Northwest

Nuclear power station
- Reactor type: BWR
- Reactor supplier: General Electric
- Cooling towers: 6 × Mechanical Draft (Note: 6 × concentric low-profile precast concrete cooling towers, each with 6 × individual induced-draft cooling cells, for a total of 36 induced-draft cooling cells.)
- Cooling source: Columbia River
- Thermal capacity: 1 × 3544 MW_{th}

Power generation
- Units operational: 1 × 1216 MW
- Make and model: BWR-5 (Mark 2)
- Nameplate capacity: 1216 MW
- Capacity factor: 83.14% (2017); 75.10% (lifetime)
- Annual net output: 8128 GWh (2017)

External links
- Website: Home Website
- Commons: Related media on Commons

Columbia Generating Station is a nuclear commercial energy facility located on the Hanford Site, 10 miles (16 km) north of Richland, Washington. It is owned and operated by Energy Northwest, a Washington state, not-for-profit joint operating agency. Licensed by the Nuclear Regulatory Commission in 1983, Columbia first produced electricity in May 1984, and entered commercial operation in December 1984.

Columbia produces 1,207 megawatts net electricity.

== Design and function ==
Columbia Generating Station is a BWR-5. It features a Mark II containment structure.

The reactor core holds up to 764 fuel assemblies, and 185 control rods, more technically known as control blades. The reactor is licensed for a power output of 3486 thermal megawatts (MWt). The gross electrical output of the plant is 1230 megawatts-electric (MWe).

The Columbia Generating Station features six low-profile fan-driven cooling towers. Each tower cascades clean warmed water, a byproduct of water heat exchanging with steam after leaving a turbine, down itself and subsequently cools the warmed water via a combination of evaporation and heat exchange with the surrounding air. Some water droplets fall back to earth in the process, thereby creating a hoar frost in the winter. At times, the vapor cloud from the cooling towers can reach 10,000 feet (3,000 m) in height and can be seen at a great distance. Replacement water for the evaporated water is drawn from the nearby Columbia River.

== History ==
Columbia was built by the former Washington Public Power Supply System, known since 1998 as Energy Northwest. Its construction permit was issued in March 1973, and construction began in late 1975 on the Hanford Site. Because of cost overruns and construction delays, the plant did not begin commercial operation until December 1984. Of the five commercial reactors originally planned by the Bonneville Power Administration and the Supply System in Washington, Columbia was the only one completed. The nuclear power plant was also known as Hanford Two, with Hanford One being the 800 MWe power generating plant connected to the N-Reactor (decommissioned in 1987), a dual purpose reactor operated by the Atomic Energy Commission: producing plutonium for the nuclear weapons stockpile, as well as generating electricity for the grid.

When the Supply System changed its name to Energy Northwest, the plant's name went from WNP-2 (Washington Public Power Supply System Nuclear Project number 2) to Columbia Generating Station. In 2000, then-Executive Board Chairman Rudi Bertschi said the plant's former name referred "to an earlier era when the Washington Public Power Supply System was building five nuclear power plants. Those days are long gone," said Bertschi. "Our plant has made the transition, as has Energy Northwest, from being a marginal producer to being a key cog in the region's energy machine."

Extensive maintenance was completed during the planned refueling outage starting in early April 2011, including the replacement of the original condenser. At the time, the refueling outage marked the end of a record-setting 486 days of continuous operations. The outage was planned for 80 days finishing in July; however, work was not completed until that September. The total cost of repairs and refueling was $170 million. Replacing the condenser allowed for better plant efficiency thus producing more electricity in the future, helping offset the cost of the project.

Columbia's original NRC license to operate was scheduled to expire in December 2023. In January 2010, Energy Northwest filed an application with the Nuclear Regulatory Commission for a 20-year license renewal – through 2043. In May 2012, the NRC approved the 20-year license renewal.

In 2012, Energy Northwest entered into agreements with the Tennessee Valley Authority, the U.S. Enrichment Corporation (Centrus Energy) and the Department of Energy to turn depleted uranium (also called uranium tails) into low-cost enriched uranium product for further future processing into nuclear fuel. Buying under market value at a set price to obtain a nine-year fuel supply, the transaction is estimated to bring between $171 and $275 million in savings to the region through 2028.

Energy Northwest announced in January 2024 that they plan to expand the station with 12 small modular reactors (SMRs).

== Economics ==
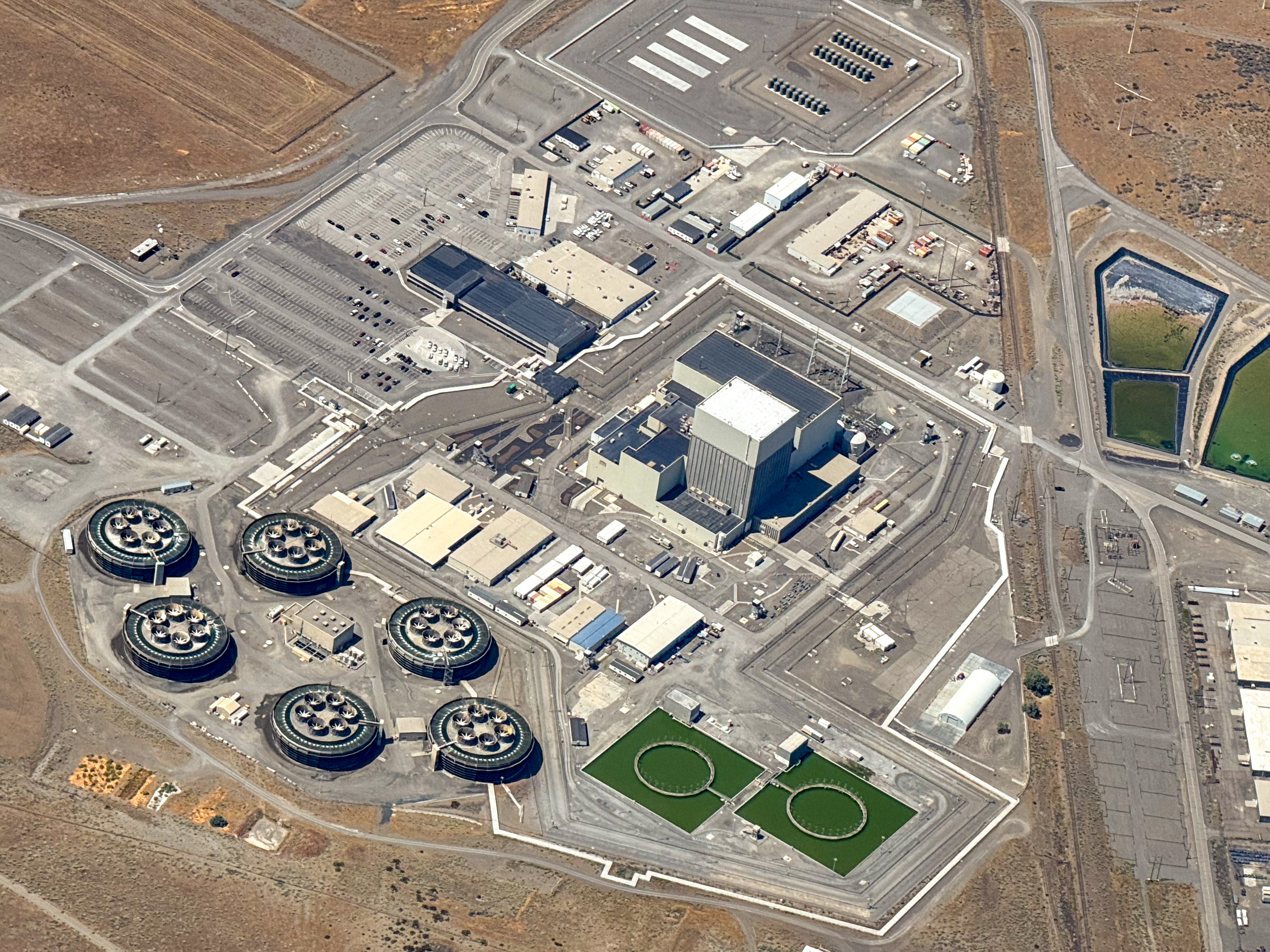
Aerial view of the facility

In late 2012, the Bonneville Power Administration and Energy Northwest came together to analyze the financial value of Columbia in light of low energy prices in the wholesale electricity market and historic low fuel costs for natural gas-fired power plants. The agencies studied three scenarios and concluded, in April 2013, that Columbia's continued operation was the most cost-effective option for consumers.

In April 2013, Energy Northwest commissioned a third-party study by IHS Cambridge Energy Research Associates, a firm with a 75-year reputation for independent expertise in the fields of energy, economics, market conditions and business risk. IHS CERA came to the same conclusion as the April 2013 joint BPA-EN study.

In December, 2013, McCullough Research published Economic Analysis of the Columbia Generating Station. This report found that the incremental operation, maintenance, fuel, and capital additions costs for the Columbia Generating Station greatly exceeded expected market values for power in the Pacific Northwest.

In 2013, the Columbia Generating Station set a record for electricity generation during a refueling outage year – 8.4 million megawatt hours of electricity sent to the regional power grid. In 2012 – a non-refueling outage year – Columbia generated a record 9.3 million megawatt hours of electricity for the regional power grid (95% capacity factor).

In January 2014, the Public Power Council, representing Northwest consumer-owned utilities, examined the competing market assessments and said they found no compelling evidence that ceasing operation of Columbia is economically advisable for the region. The PPC assessment supported public statements by BPA affirming Columbia's provision of unique, firm, baseload, non-carbon emitting generation with predictable costs for the region's ratepayers.

The Public Power Council observed in February 2014 that the variable cost of Columbia operations in recent years were slightly above spot market energy prices. However, the council stated that a single unanticipated shift in the markets "can easily wipe out years of anticipated benefits" gained from replacement power.

The council referenced the Western Energy Crisis of 2000–2001. During that relatively short energy crisis, according to the council, the cost benefit of Columbia's power "dwarf[ed] the modest benefits that would have been achieved" through replacement power. "In 2001 alone the operation of Columbia Generating Station compared to the market saved Bonneville Power Administration ratepayers $1.4 billion," according to the council.

== Electricity production ==
Generation (MWh) of Columbia Generating Station
Year	Jan	Feb	Mar	Apr	May	Jun	Jul	Aug	Sep	Oct	Nov	Dec	Annual (Total)
2001	842,334	758,058	831,472	751,937	389,614	-7,286	595,523	785,605	805,414	841,249	814,440	842,069	8,250,429
2002	842,886	471,815	831,207	803,086	808,114	551,646	694,707	809,137	761,289	830,425	806,991	837,172	9,048,475
2003	830,827	718,423	451,885	793,479	70,591	11,567	666,947	819,854	796,028	817,158	806,785	831,164	7,614,708
2004	798,707	780,106	830,737	798,993	786,513	770,478	771,274	206,315	791,277	821,930	796,763	828,490	8,981,583
2005	829,313	736,839	816,109	782,298	142,600	76,023	769,051	826,390	801,911	835,588	781,728	844,423	8,242,273
2006	806,571	721,682	810,623	801,217	787,703	747,664	793,942	814,262	803,113	815,969	594,308	831,223	9,328,277
2007	838,202	758,783	811,071	619,520	254,847	42,400	768,651	764,693	783,552	831,062	795,942	839,837	8,108,560
2008	822,189	781,476	805,559	802,816	751,934	712,652	802,249	718,798	789,085	821,604	632,563	828,714	9,269,639
2009	804,901	593,407	821,820	709,683	167,382	19,858	695,488	105,617	547,254	721,340	612,921	834,343	6,634,014
2010	807,674	742,828	782,193	782,654	806,010	567,612	765,215	770,477	791,481	819,251	797,673	808,065	9,241,133
2011	822,817	745,596	814,989	22,512	0	0	0	0	13,801	805,467	748,464	832,632	4,806,278
2012	843,673	785,874	826,000	785,739	500,353	715,548	772,557	826,197	798,766	833,315	810,062	835,625	9,333,709
2013	839,101	757,369	820,505	801,738	254,663	78,260	806,046	821,066	792,921	836,946	813,660	838,615	8,460,890
2014	840,118	745,364	835,874	811,566	777,212	799,534	820,147	598,232	800,601	828,060	804,052	836,561	9,497,321
2015	836,137	754,720	822,761	783,078	185,997	20,075	581,011	836,585	823,629	853,373	803,927	859,619	8,160,912
2016	860,813	795,433	744,868	814,036	829,788	814,125	830,056	822,608	801,132	841,002	819,180	652,581	9,625,622
2017	840,627	756,843	791,639	551,250	223,028	269,717	855,834	537,019	735,650	858,052	841,597	867,003	8,128,259
2018	862,328	787,939	866,437	822,479	602,753	723,960	848,521	849,255	829,277	862,462	840,361	812,669	9,708,441
2019	849,557	779,746	861,349	816,440	243,895	244,696	838,342	848,354	822,885	861,659	839,295	860,281	8,866,499
2020	861,324	724,803	853,818	835,101	788,141	420,416	765,921	848,524	817,086	858,556	795,088	858,272	9,427,050
2021	865,094	768,461	849,781	746,667	150,615	304,057	845,579	849,376	815,383	848,536	836,592	631,147	8,511,288
2022	867,584	755,900	853,749	827,383	847,700	650,116	840,895	837,443	820,076	854,566	836,503	859,620	9,851,535
2023	831,225	774,540	837,247	689,238	93,606	261,565	830,721	839,836	820,063	825,759	814,786	816,432	8,435,018
2024	858,425	802,499	841,434	825,823	846,368	805,756	833,135	841,568	797,036	853,088	821,616	840,391	9,967,139
2025	851,742	764,755	765,215	232,919	-3,317	103,162	838,731	840,477	819,547	858,737	833,370	842,776	7,748,114
2026	862,052	607,293	839,779	823,309	807,828	814,132	841,235	841,918					--

== Spent fuel ==
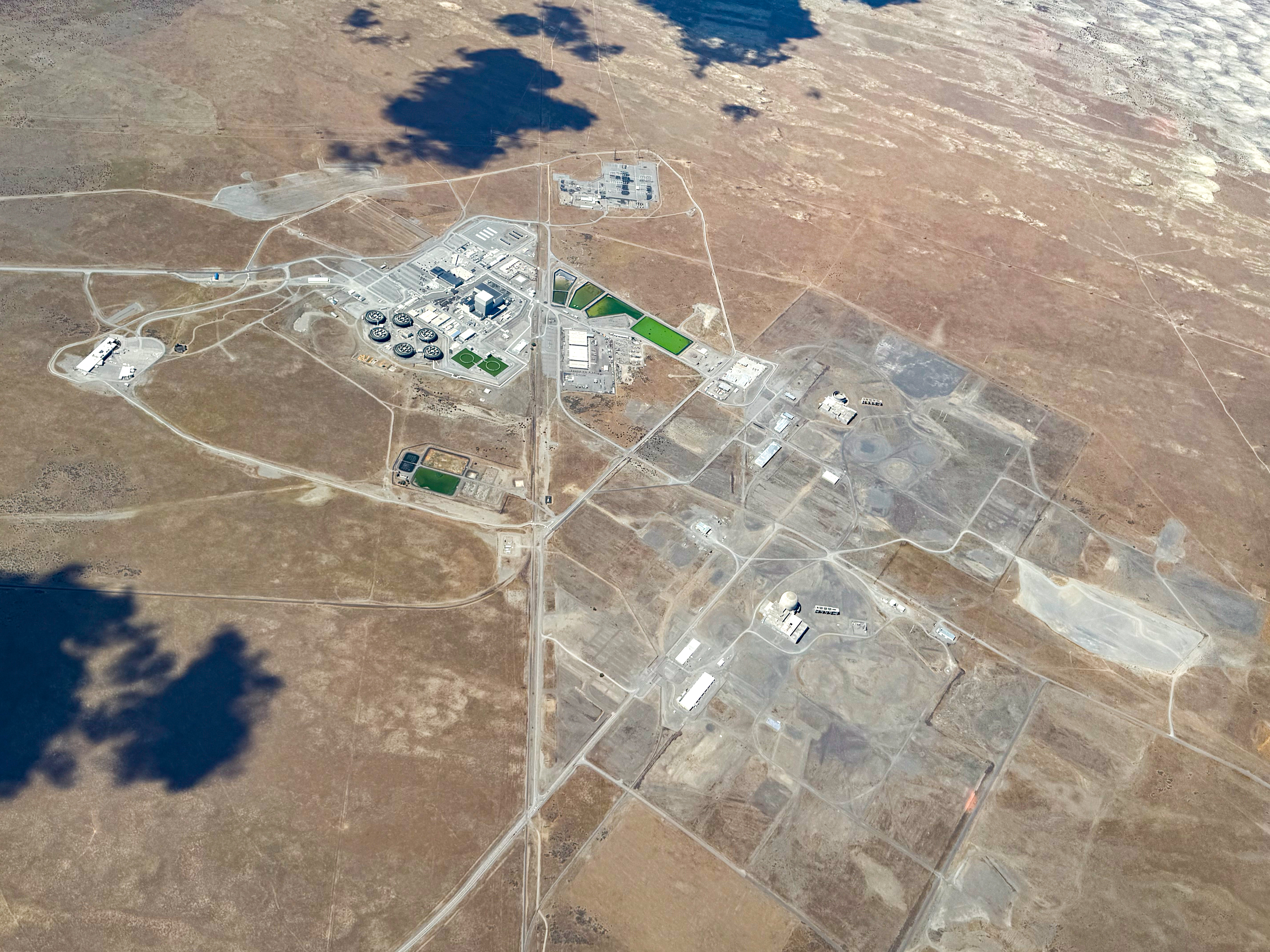
The facility with WNP-1 and WNP-4 visible at the lower right

Columbia Generating Station's spent fuel pool is able to accommodate 2,658 fuel assemblies. It was designed as a short-term storage option until a national repository could be built. Since there is no projected start date for the stalled national long-term nuclear waste storage facility at Yucca Mountain Repository in Nevada, the station obtained approval for dry cask storage to avoid exceeding the pool's licensed capacity. The Columbia Generating Station has an on-site installation, which allows for storage of spent fuel rods in specially designed and manufactured casks. As of 2021, 45 casks have been loaded and stored in the installation, making room in the spent fuel pool.

== Surrounding population ==
The Nuclear Regulatory Commission defines two emergency planning zones around nuclear power plants: a plume exposure pathway zone with a radius of 10 miles (16 km), concerned primarily with exposure to, and inhalation of, airborne radioactive contamination, and an ingestion pathway zone of about 50 miles (80 km), concerned primarily with ingestion of food and liquid contaminated by radioactive materials.

The 2010 population within 10 miles (16 km) of Columbia was 10,055, an increase of 10.4 percent in a decade. The 2010 population within 50 miles (80 km) was 445,416, an increase of 23.4 percent since 2000. Cities within 50 miles include Richland (12 miles (19 km) to city center) and Pasco (18 miles (29 km) to city center).

== Potential risks ==
The Nuclear Regulatory Commission's estimate of the risk each year of an earthquake intense enough to cause core damage to the reactor at Columbia was 1 in 47,619, according to an NRC study published in August 2010. The Department of Energy is planning a new earthquake assessment that will update the last comprehensive one conducted in 1996. The U.S. Geological Survey has shown that the active faults of the Puget Sound Region are connected to ridges in the Mid-Columbia by faults that cross the Cascades (see Yakima Fold Belt § Geology).

According to the U.S. Nuclear Regulatory Commission, the Columbia Generating Station site is a "Dry Site" since the plant is above the Design Basis Flood Line.

== See also ==
- List of nuclear reactors
- WNP-1 and WNP-4
- WNP-3 and WNP-5
