= Process heat =

Heat used in industrial processes

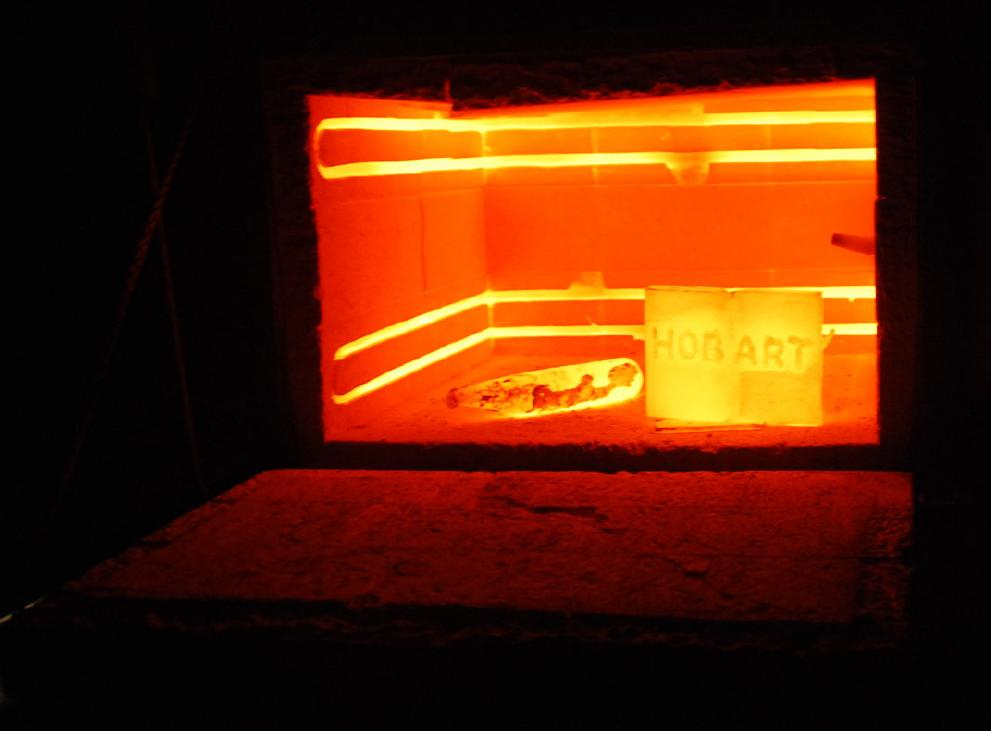
Glass or metal may be annealed at high temperature to increase durability

Process heat refers to the application of heat during industrial processes. Some form of process heat is used during the manufacture of many common products, from concrete to glass to steel to paper. Where byproducts or wastes of the overall industrial process are available, those are often used to provide process heat. Examples include black liquor in papermaking or bagasse in sugarcane processing.

== Requirements ==
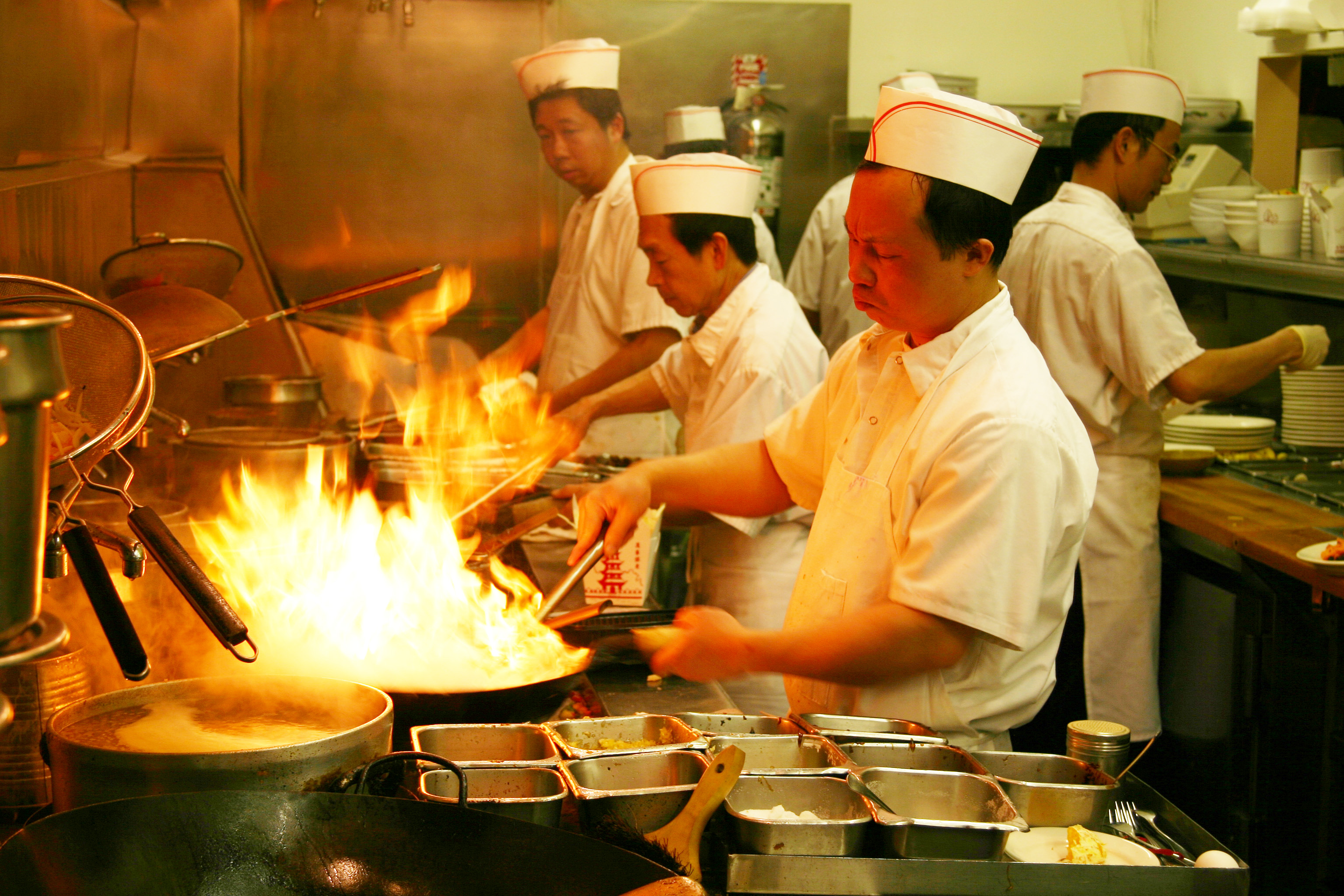
Cooking is a common application of process heat

Process heating encompasses a wide variety of applications, including boiling water, cooking, distillation, annealing, and forging. The required temperature of the process varies widely, with about half the industrial process heat having operating temperatures above 400 °C (752 °F). These higher-temperature processes can generally only be supplied by dedicated supplies like natural gas or coal, although pre-heating from other sources is also common in order to reduce fuel use. Those processes operating below the median can draw on a much wider variety of sources, including waste heat from other processes in the same industrial process. Resistive heating would in theory be a possible source of process heat but even as it converts nearly 100% of the supplied electricity to heat, it is obviously less efficient to burn a fuel in a thermal power plant to produce electricity only to use that electricity for process heat than to use the fuel directly. Thus this source of heat is only used where electricity from non-thermal sources (such as hydropower) is cheap and plentiful. Heat pumps which are commonly employed for home heating, warm water and other heat applications below 100 °C (212 °F) have too low a Carnot efficiency at high temperature differences between "hot" and "cold" end to be worthwhile. Some processes such as molten salt electrolysis provide the required process heat by the same electricity that is also needed to keep the endothermic reaction going.

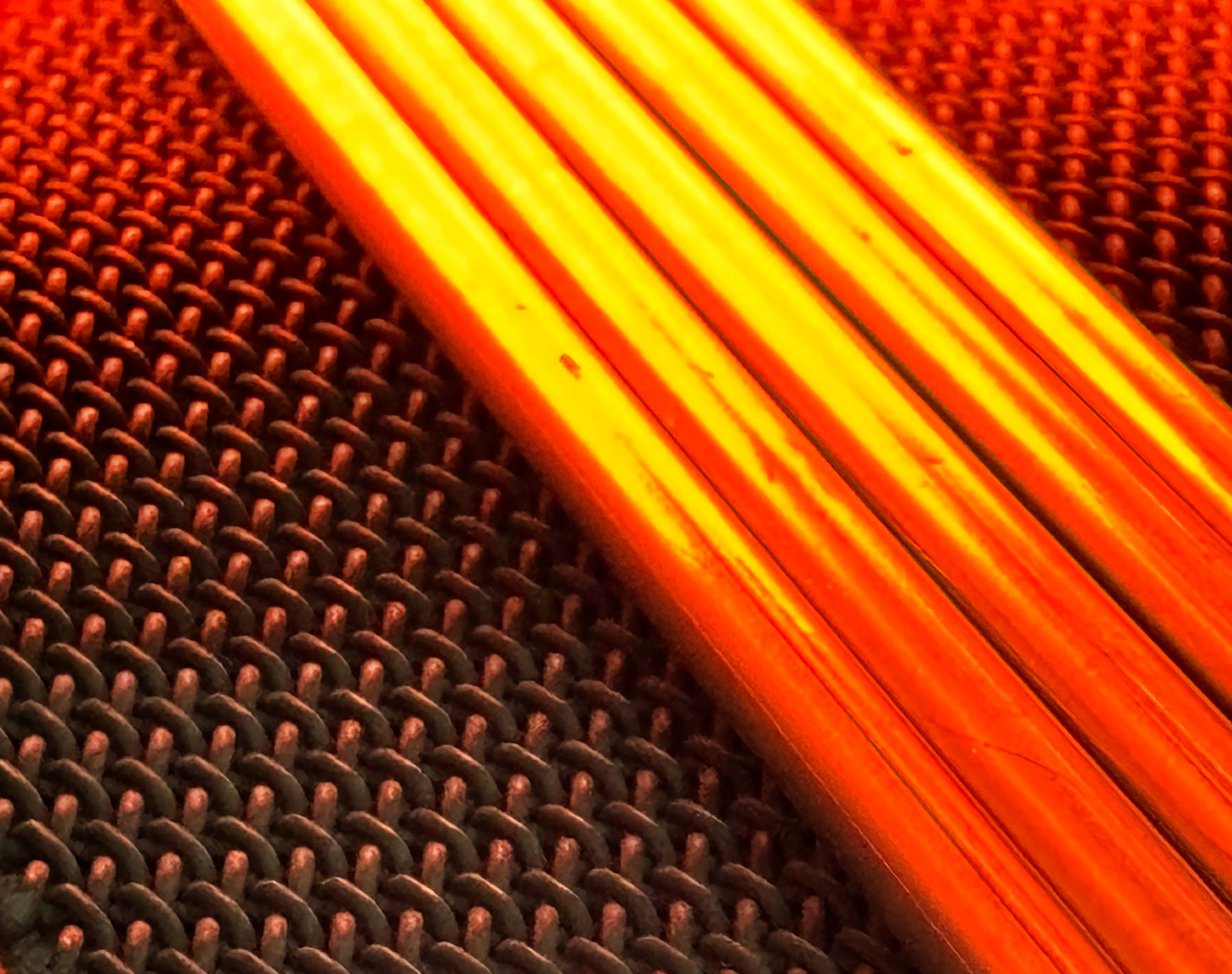
Precious-metal tubing heated in an industrial oven during processing

Heat is usually described by "grade" with higher temperatures having a higher "grade". This is because heat naturally flows from hot to cold and it is thus always possible to use a high temperature source of heat for lower temperature applications but not vice versa. As higher grade heat is more cumbersome and expensive to produce and as materials have limited heat resistance, there are efforts to reduce working temperatures wherever possible through the use of catalysts and fluxes. In equilibrium reactions where temperature is one of the factors influencing the equilibrium, temperature requirements can be reduced by removing the desired products in a continuous process. For example, if an equilibrium reaction between AB and CD produces AC and BD and the equilibrium can be shifted rightward by increasing temperature, continuously removing AC or BD from the reaction can serve to reduce the temperature requirements (cf. principle of Le Chatelier). However, there are limits to this as the speed of reaction is also temperature-dependent. Catalysts can serve to increase the speed of reaction at any given temperature but they, by definition, do not shift the equilibrium.

== Decarbonization ==
A high-temperature nuclear reactor can provide process heat for hydrogen production

According to the United States Department of Energy, in 2018 process heat accounted for approximately 50% of energy use in the manufacturing sector, as well as 30% of Greenhouse gas emissions, and is the most significant source of energy use in the industrial sector overall. Accordingly, it is the target of significant efforts to introduce new forms of carbon neutral or at least lower-carbon process heat supplies.

Some wastes - including waste tires - are commonly used as replacement fuels or mixed into conventional fuel at appropriate ratios. Several nuclear reactors have been used to produce process heat as well as electricity, with two such reactors operational as of 2012. Other potential lower-carbon sources include Biomass, which is already in widespread use in industry, while geothermal and concentrated solar power remain experimental as of 2024.

Nuclear reactors have provided process heat on several occasions, however it has not been realized at a large scale. Several CANDU reactors supplied steam for industrial use until 1998. One problem with using nuclear power for process heat is that pressurized water reactors, commonly used for electric power generation, have an operating temperature well below 400 °C (752 °F) and boiling water reactors work at even lower temperatures, around 285 °C (545 °F).

Other reactor designs, particularly high-temperature gas-cooled reactors (HTGR), may be more suitable for process heat generation. The Advanced Gas-cooled Reactors, constructed in the United Kingdom, had a high coolant outlet temperature 610 °C (1,130 °F) as an explicit design goal for increased thermal efficiency. The Generation IV International Forum selected the Very High Temperature Reactor concept, a higher-temperature evolution of HTGR designs, for further development as part of future nuclear energy systems. Of particular interest are small modular reactor designs, which could be built onsite for process heat generation. The Chinese HTR-PM, a 250 MW_{th} HTGR, features an outlet temperature of 750 °C (1,380 °F). As of 2024, it is the only high-temperature small modular reactor currently in operation.

X-energy, an American reactor developer, is developing modular HTGRs for process heat generation. The company is working with Dow Chemical Company to replace the natural gas-fired cogeneration plant at Dow's Seadrift site with a nuclear power plant. The project, called the Long Mott Generating Station, is currently under review as of 2026 by the US Nuclear Regulatory Commission.

In 2026, the Indian Department of Atomic Energy opened a hydrogen production pilot plant at the Fast Breeder Test Reactor in Kalpakkam. This plant is the first use of nuclear process heat for hydrogen production. The pilot plant uses a new copper-chlorine thermochemical cycle, which requires heat between 450 °C (842 °F) and 550 °C (1,022 °F). This range is better-suited for the outlet temperatures of current nuclear reactors than other cycles requiring temperatures exceeding 800 °C (1,470 °F).

Likewise, geothermal heat sources often have relatively low temperatures, sometimes even requiring binary cycles for electricity generation.

A stopgap solution for decarbonization at the price of increased costs (ignoring carbon pricing) and lower round trip efficiency is the replacement of currently used fossil fuels by Power to X derived fuels. While this approach has the advantage of being usable with existing technology with minimal or no modification, it is less efficient than even resistive heating as the chemical processes required to turn electric energy into artificial fuels are less efficient than resistive heating. In processes where the fuel provides both heat and a chemical function (e.g. coke as a reducing agent in steelmaking) a power-to-x fuel may however be the only feasible low carbon alternative for some time to come. Hydrogen derived via processes such as electrolysis of water is often proposed as an alternative to current sources of process heat. Hydrogen is already in widespread use in industry today but is mostly derived from fossil fuels via processes such as steam reforming as of 2022. As some proposed processes for hydrogen production like the sulfur-iodine cycle themselves require high temperatures, their feasibility for generating hydrogen as a fuel for process heat as opposed to the direct use of the heat needed for the process seems questionable.
