= Clay Sell =

American government official and CEO (born 1967)

J. Clay Sell
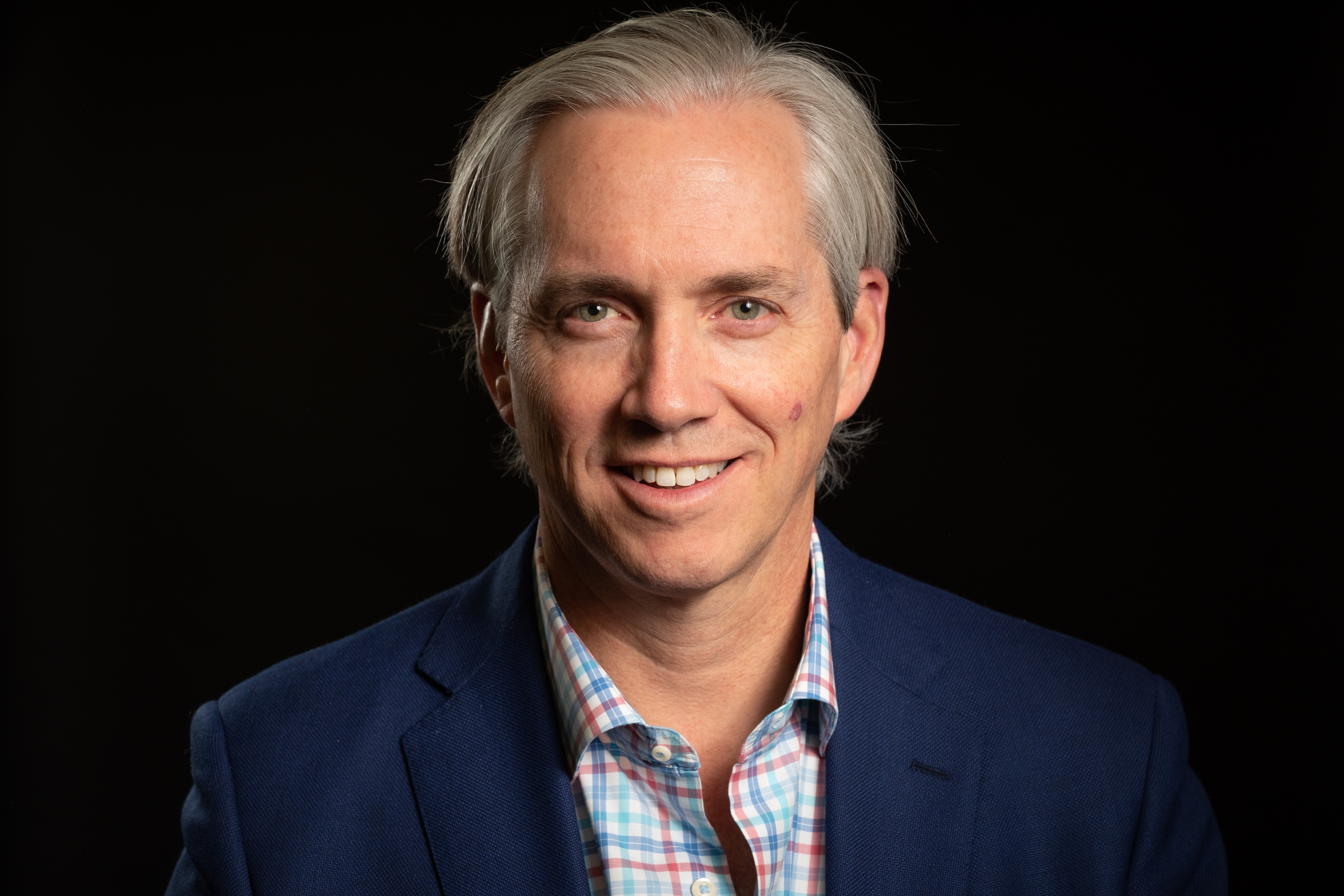

15th United States Deputy Secretary of Energy
- In office March 21, 2005 – February 29, 2008
- President: George W. Bush
- Preceded by: Kyle E. McSlarrow
- Succeeded by: Jeffrey Kupfer

Personal details
- Born: Jeffrey Clay Sell; April 28, 1967 (age 59) Texas U.S.
- Spouse: Alisa Malechek
- Education: Texas Tech University (BBA); University of Texas (JD)

J. Clay Sell (born April 28, 1967) is the CEO of X-energy, a U.S. based, privately owned company that develops small modular nuclear reactors and advanced fuel technology (HALEU) for clean energy generation. Sell previously served as United States Deputy Secretary of Energy in the George W. Bush administration from March 21, 2005, until he resigned, effective February 29, 2008.

Sell launched his career working as senior staff for the future House Armed Services Committee Chairman Mac Thornberry, from 1995 to 1999.

From 2000 to 2001, Sell was Chief of the Bush-Cheney Transition Energy Policy Team. Additionally, Sell worked directly for the Chairman of the Appropriations Committee, Senator Ted Stevens, in his role as Majority Clerk and Staff Director for the Energy and Water Development Subcommittee from 2000 to 2003.

In 2003, Sell transitioned to the White House to work as a Special Assistant to President Bush in Economic Policy, where he advised the President on domestic energy policy. Sell was integral in coordinating and implementing the administration's energy policies.

In 2004 Sell worked again as a Special Assistant to the President for Legislative Affairs, with a focus on the United States Senate agenda for energy, natural resources and budget appropriations.

In March 2005, Sell was nominated as the United States Deputy Secretary at the Department of Energy for the George W. Bush administration.

Throughout his time as Deputy Secretary, Sell served under Secretary Samuel W. Bodman III and stood as the Chief Operating Officer for the department. Sell was responsible for the oversight of a 23-billion-dollar budget with over 100,000 employees. It was during this time that Sell became a frontrunner for nuclear policies for the administration.

Sell completed his 14-year run in Government in 2008, and transitioned to the private sector to serve as the President of Hunt Energy Horizons, LLC, working to build the renewables energy portfolio for the company. Sell remained President for eight years. Finally, in 2019, Sell returned to the nuclear industry and was appointed CEO of X-energy.

Sell was born in Texas to Judy and George Sell. He is one of four children, Julie Swindle, Rob Sell, and Tom Sell. He married Alisa Malechek, and they have three children, John, Robert, and Mary Margaret Sell. Sell holds a Juris Doctor from the University of Texas School of Law and a BBA in Accounting from Texas Tech University.

== Other appointments ==
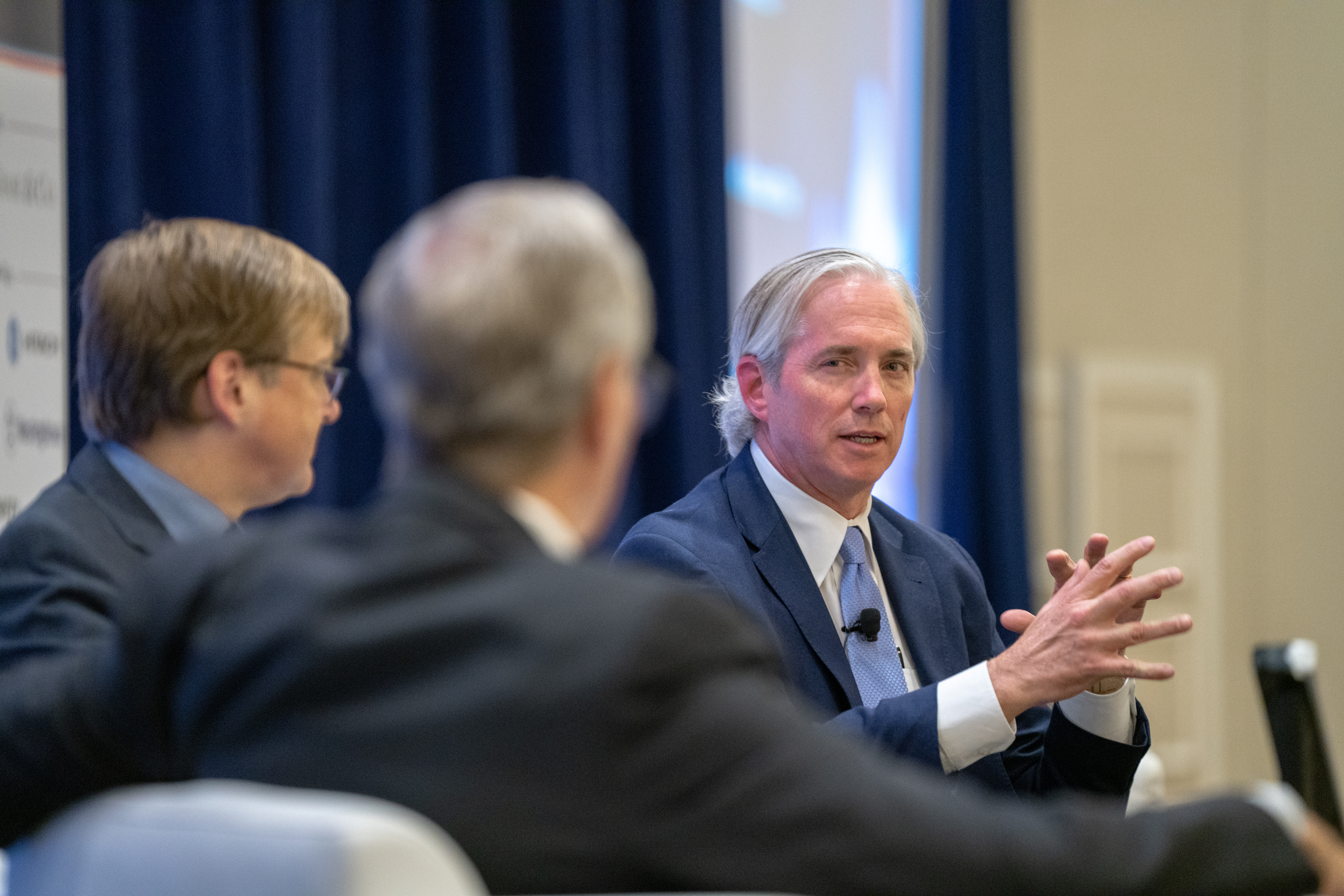
Sell speaks at the 2022 Nuclear Financing Summit on how to shape the future of advanced nuclear deployment for industrial decarbonization

- Special Assistant to the President for Legislative Affairs (February 2004-
- Member of the National Economic Council (Unknown-February 2004)
- Special Assistant to the President for Economic Policy (Unknown-February 2004)
- Staff Director and Majority Clerk of the United States Senate Appropriations Committee on Energy and Water Development
- Chief of the Bush-Cheney Transition Energy Policy Team (2000–2001)
- Administrative Assistant to Congressman Mac Thornberry (1997–1999)
- Staff of Congressman Mac Thornberry (1995–1997)
