= X-energy =

American nuclear energy company

X-Energy, Inc.
- Type: Public
- Traded as: Nasdaq: XE (Class A); Russell 1000 component
- Industry: Nuclear power
- Founded: 2009; 17 years ago
- Founder: Kam Ghaffarian (Chairman)
- Headquarters: Rockville, Maryland, U.S.
- Key people: Clay Sell (CEO)
- Products: Small modular reactors; Nuclear fuel
- Website: www.x-energy.com

X-Energy, Inc. is a publicly traded American nuclear reactor and fuel engineering company, headquartered in Rockville, Maryland. It is developing a pebble-bed high-temperature gas-cooled reactor, the Xe-100, as well as a proprietary type of TRISO fuel called TRISO-X.

It has received funding from private sources and various government grants and contracts, notably through the Department of Energy's (DOE) Advanced Reactor Concept Cooperative Agreement in 2016 and its Advanced Reactor Demonstration Program (ARDP) in 2020.

== History ==
The company was founded in 2009 by Kam Ghaffarian. In January 2016, X-energy was provided a five-year grant of up to $40 million, as part of the DOE's Advanced Reactor Concept Cooperative Agreement to advance elements of their reactor development. Former Deputy Secretary of Energy, Clay Sell, was appointed CEO of X-energy in 2019.

In 2019, X-energy received funding from the United States Department of Defense to develop small military reactors for use at forward bases as part of Project Pele. However, the Department of Defense selected BWX Technologies instead in 2022.

In October 2020, the company was chosen by the DOE as a recipient of a matching grant totaling between $400 million and $4 billion over the next 5 to 7 years for the cost of building a demonstration reactor of their Xe-100, helium-cooled pebble-bed reactor design. The grant is a part of the DOE's Advanced Reactor Demonstration Program, which also awarded the same grant to TerraPower.

In 2022, Curtiss-Wright agreed to act as the preferred supplier of three critical components of the Xe-100 reactor. The initial installation of the reactor was projected to be for Energy Northwest in Washington State. However, in March 2023, X-energy and Dow Chemical Company agreed to develop the project at one of Dow's sites on the U.S. Gulf Coast, to be called the Long Mott Generating Station. Dow and X-energy submitted a construction permit application for the plant to the Nuclear Regulatory Commission (NRC) in 2025. The permit was issued on November 10, 2026, after an 18-month review.

In December 2022, X-energy planned to go public in a $2 billion deal using the special-purpose acquisition company Ares Acquisition, but this was called off in October 2023 due to the then macroeconomic situation and the effect on the market of the cancellation of the first U.S. SMR deployment project, the Carbon Free Power Project, because of cost increases. The company laid off some staff in November 2023. In December 2023, the company raised $235 million of investment in a new funding round from existing investors.

In July 2023, X-energy and Energy Northwest signed an agreement to consider deploying up to 12 Xe-100 modules at the previously considered Washington site. Amazon joined the project in October 2024, and announced that it would fund four Xe-100 reactors due to increased electricity demand from the AI boom. The project, called the Cascade Advanced Energy Facility, is part of a deal between Amazon and X-energy to build up to 5 GW of Xe-100 reactors to power Amazon's data centers. As of 2025, the facility is expected to start operating in the mid-2030s.

In September 2025 X-Energy announced plans with British multinational energy and services company Centrica to deploy up to 12 Xe-100 reactors at the Hartlepool site in the UK, as part of a broader goal of building 6 gigawatts of Xe-100s in the UK.

On April 24, 2026, X-energy went public via an initial public offering (IPO) on the NASDAQ, raising over $1 billion. It was the largest nuclear IPO on record.

== Products ==
=== Xe-100 reactor ===
The Xe-100 is a pebble-bed small modular reactor (SMR) designed by X-energy. A high-temperature gas-cooled reactor, the Xe-100 is moderated by graphite and cooled by inert helium gas, which exits the reactor at over 750 °C (1,380 °F). The heat from the helium coolant is used to generate steam for power generation. Each reactor module is planned to generate 200 MW_{th} and could either be used directly for industrial process heat or for electricity generation, where it would produce approximately 80 MW_{e}. As an SMR, multiple Xe-100 modules are combined to form a larger power plant.

The fuel for the Xe-100 is contained in thousands of spherical fuel pebbles, each containing many small TRISO particles. Each particle contains uranium fuel enriched to 20% (HALEU), to allow for longer periods between refueling. TRISO fuel was originally developed for high-temperature gas-cooled reactors in the 1960s, and has been used in several commercial reactors since then. It is capable of retaining fission products at high temperatures, making nuclear meltdowns impossible. The Department of Energy has stated that, "Simply put, TRISO particles cannot melt in a reactor and can withstand extreme temperatures that are well beyond the threshold of current nuclear fuels."

In a February 2026 amendment to its draft registration statement, X-Energy presented "illustrative" economics showing the total lifetime cost of a four-reactor Xe-100 plant at $1.66 billion–$2.18 billion, with $1.095 billion-$1.25 billion dedicated to fuel costs.

=== TRISO-X ===
X-energy has developed a proprietary blend of TRISO fuel, called TRISO-X, to power their Xe-100 reactors. TRISO-X pebbles consist of small kernels of uranium encapsulated by three layers of carbon and ceramic materials, and packed into small spherical fuel elements.

The company started operating a pilot-scale TRISO-X production line at Oak Ridge National Laboratory in 2016, and applied for a license from the NRC in 2022 for a commercial-scale TRISO-X fuel fabrication facility called TX-1. The facility is funded as part of the DOE's Advanced Reactor Demonstration Program. In August 2025, X-energy selected Clark Construction to build the TX-1 facility. The company also began irradiation testing of TRISO-X fuel in the Advanced Test Reactor at Idaho National Laboratory in November 2025, and construction on the TX-1 facility began soon after. The facility is expected to start operating in 2027, producing initial fuel for the Long Mott plant.

In February 2026, the NRC approved the Part 70 special nuclear material handling license for TX-1 and a planned second facility, TX-2. It was the first Category II license ever issued by the NRC, and is the first commercial-scale fuel fabrication facility focused on HALEU fuel. The NRC will conduct a final inspection before operations can begin.

TX-1 is expected to have production capacity of 5 metric tons of uranium per year, while TX-2 is expected to have production capacity of 20 metric tons of uranium per year. TX-2 is under development, supported by the Department of Energy's Fuel Line Pilot Program. X-Energy has said TX-2 is expected to produce enough TRISO-X fuel for 144 Xe-100 reactors, as well as for other SMR developers. Total construction expenditure for both facilities is expected to reach approximately $768 million over five years.

== See also ==
- List of small modular reactor designs
- Nuclear power in the United States
- Nuclear renaissance
