= Long Mott Generating Station =

Proposed nuclear power station

- Country: United States
- Location: Calhoun County, Texas
- Status: Proposed
- Owner: Long Mott Energy

Nuclear power station
- Reactor type: HTGR
- Reactor supplier: X-energy
- Thermal capacity: 800 MW_{th}

Power generation
- Make and model: Xe-100
- Units planned: 4 × 80 MW_{e}
- Nameplate capacity: 320 MW_{e}

The Long Mott Generating Station is a planned nuclear power station in Calhoun County, Texas. It will consist of four 80 MW_{e} Xe-100 small modular reactors (SMRs) and is being developed by X-energy and Dow Chemical Company. The plant will produce both power and process heat for Dow's Seadrift chemical facility, which is currently powered by natural gas, and is expected to come online in the early 2030s. It is expected to be the first commercial facility in the United States to use an advanced reactor for process heat. The construction permit for the project was issued in November 2026.

== History ==
X-energy, a Rockville, Maryland-based SMR developer, received $80 million in 2020 from the Department of Energy's Advanced Reactor Demonstration Program (ARDP) to build four units of their 80 MW_{e} (200 MW_{th}) Xe-100 SMR, as well as to build a fuel fabrication facility for TRISO fuel.

Union Carbide, a subsidiary of Dow, operates the Seadrift Operations site, also known as Long Mott. The site manufactures around 4 billion pounds of plastics and other materials per year. Natural gas turbines located onsite supply both electricity and process heat.

In May 2023, X-energy and Dow announced the selection of the Seadrift Operations site for deployment of four Xe-100 reactors. During operation, two reactors would supply electricity to the facility while the third would supply 200 MW_{th} of heat in the form of steam. The fourth would supply and sell power to the grid. The project will receive milestone-based funding through the ARDP.

X-energy broke ground on their TX-1 fuel fabrication facility, which will fabricate the company's proprietary TRISO-X fuel, in Oak Ridge, Tennessee in 2022. The facility is supported by the ARDP as well as the Inflation Reduction Act.

Dow's subsidiary, Long Mott Energy, LLC, submitted their construction permit application to the Nuclear Regulatory Commission (NRC) on March 31, 2025. However, Dow stated that they may not make a final decision to fund the project until 2028, after submitting an operating license application to the NRC. The permit was issued on Novembe 10, 2026, after an 18-month review. Dow expects to make a preliminary investment decision in 2027.

== See also ==
- Nuclear power in the United States
