= Clallam County Public Utility District =

Public utility district in Washington, U.S.

Coordinates: 48°6′45″N 123°26′27″W

- Founded: 1940
- Headquarters: Carlsborg, Washington, U.S.
- Products: Public utility
- Website: www.clallampud.net

Clallam County Public Utility District, or Clallam PUD, is a public utility district in the northernmost part of the Olympic Peninsula in Washington state. It is owned by its customers and governed by a Board of Commissioners elected by the customer-owners. Though it is not regulated by another governmental unit, a PUD is, by state statute, a nonprofit corporation. PUDs must comply with state regulations for municipal corporations. The local customer-owner of the PUD receives benefits in the form of reduced rates for service.

As of, and at the time of this article (2026), Clallam PUD serves 30,000 customers with electric service, and 4,500 with water connections, and has offices in Port Angeles, Sequim, Forks, and Clallam Bay/Sekiu.

== History ==
In 1940 the people of Clallam County voted on the formation of a Public Utility District (PUD). The language presented on the ballot described the purpose as: “to conserve water and power resources and to supply public utility service, including water and electricity, for all uses.”

The PUD was approved and has since developed 3 more utilities: water and then sewer, and in 2000 the Legislature authorized PUDs to go into the wholesale telecommunications business.

The first meeting of the Board was at the Angeles Cooperative Creamery on December 7, 1940.

The District’s first electric operation began in 1943, in Forks when the District purchased the assets of the Olympic Public Service Corporation. The purchase included a 250-kilowatt-diesel generating plant and distribution facilities that served the areas of Forks, LaPush, Tyee, and Beaver, for $80,000.

The District moved to acquire the properties of Puget Sound Power and Light Company, located in the eastern part of the county. A legal battle ensued. The struggle for acquisition was ultimately appealed to the Supreme Court. On December 1, 1943, a jury verdict confirmed the purchase by the PUD at a price of $600,000.

In 1945, the District began providing water in the Gales Addition area. The power was extended around Port Angeles, Forks, and La Push. Plans were developed to serve the Lake Crescent and Barnes Cove areas. The Elwha early PUD pole truck dams were a valuable source of energy that the District used if the feed from Puget in the East was interrupted. However, the only practical solution for the need for more power was to bring federal power from the Grand Coulee Dam on the Columbia River.

On November 1, 1949, power from the Bonneville Power Administration came to Port Angeles via a new 115,000-volt transmission line from Shelton.

In 1956 and 1957 a 69 KV transmission line was completed in 3 phases between Sappho and Sekiu, Sekiu to Neah Bay, and from the Forks Substation to the Tyee Substation.

In 1957 Clallam County and 17 other PUDs joined to form the Washington Public Power Supply System (WPPSS)(now is Energy Northwest). The District still receives annual payments for its share of the Packwood Hydroelectric Project undertaken and completed by WPPSS. Later, WPPSS generated electricity using steam from the federal government’s nuclear reactor at Hanford, the largest civilian nuclear power plant in the U.S.

To meet future energy needs, WPPSS decided to build 5 nuclear power plants at Hanford and Satsop in Grays Harbor County. Most of the projects were never completed due to cost escalation and increased regulation. The Supreme Court found that the District, along with other participants, did not have the authority to enter into some of the agreements. The District withdrew its membership from WPPSS in 1984 with a net loss of $2,259,034 in 1988.

In 1990 Clallam PUD was authorized to offer sewage system services. In 2002 Clallam PUD added a fourth utility, high-speed telecommunications, for its own benefit and public access.

== Governance ==
Clallam County Public Utility District (PUD) Number 1 is directed by a 3-member Board of Commissioners elected by citizens of the county.

Each commissioner represents a different sector of the county and serves a 6-year term. Each commissioner also represents the District as a delegate to various business organizations. The terms are staggered so that a different commissioner stands for election every 2 years.

The Commissioners set utility policies and hire a General Manager to implement those policies.

== See also ==
- Carlsborg, Washington
- Clallam County, Washington
- Forks, Washington
- Port Angeles, Washington
- Sequim, Washington
- Energy Northwest
