= WNP-3 and WNP-5 =

Cancelled nuclear power plant in Washington, United States

WNP-3/5
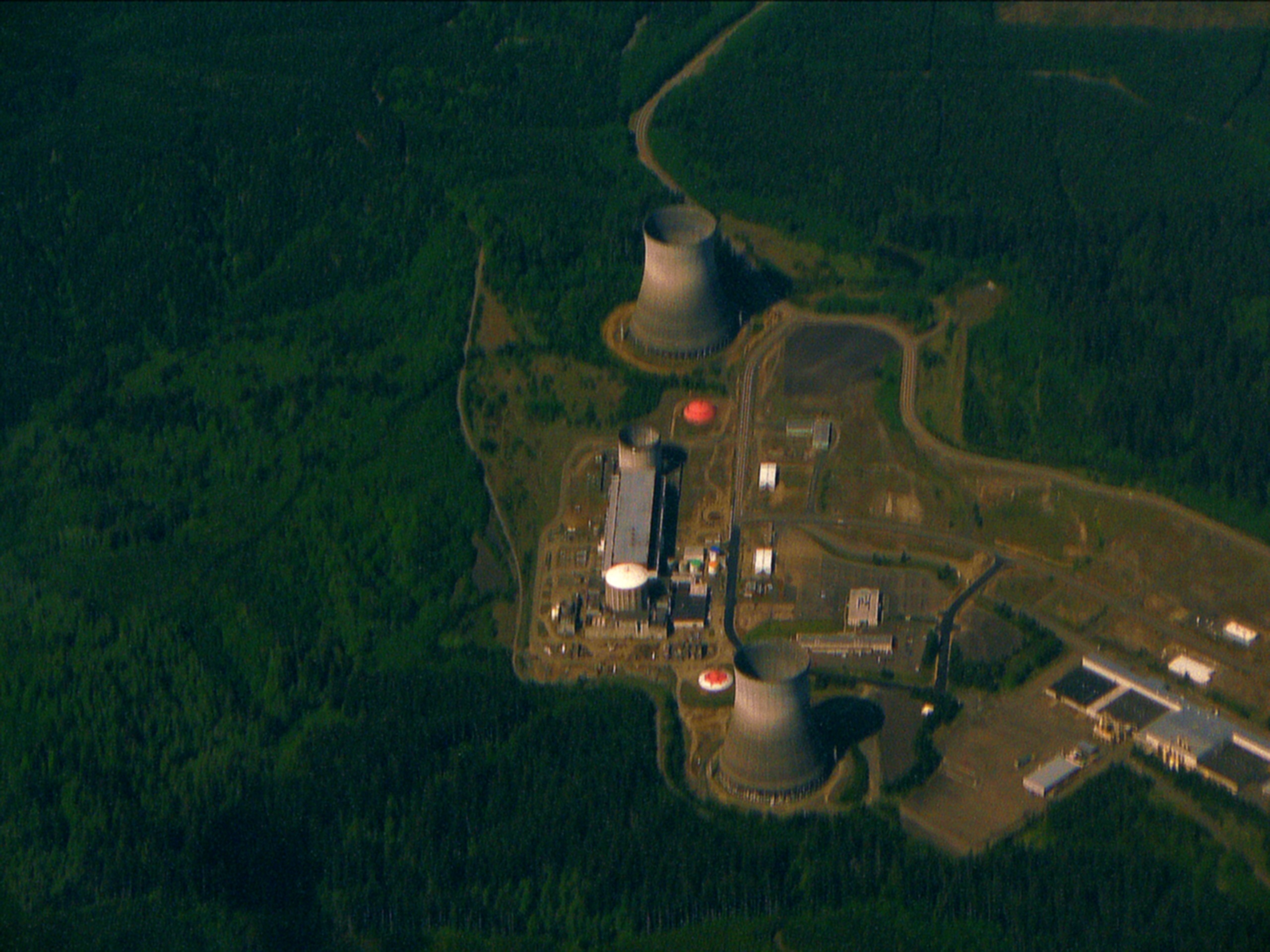
- View of the plant in 2006
- Official name: Nuclear Project Nos. 3 and 5
- Country: United States
- Location: Near Elma, Grays Harbor County, Washington
- Coordinates: 46.9598°N 123.4696°W
- Status: Cancelled
- Construction began: May 1, 1977
- Commission date: N/A
- Owner: Washington Public Power Supply System

Nuclear power station
- Reactor type: PWR
- Reactor supplier: Combustion Engineering

Power generation
- Units cancelled: 2 × 1240 MW System 80

External links
- Commons: Related media on Commons

Washington Nuclear Project Nos. 3 and 5, abbreviated as WNP-3 and WNP-5 (collectively known as the Satsop Nuclear Power Plant) were two of the five nuclear power plants on which construction was started by the Washington Public Power Supply System (WPPSS, also called "Whoops!") in order to meet projected electricity demand in the Pacific Northwest. WNP-1, WNP-2 and WNP-3 were part of the original 1968 plan, with WNP-4 (a twin to WNP-1 and located at the same site) and WNP-5 (a twin to WNP-3, in similar fashion) added in the early 1970s.

WNP-2 was the only unit of the five that was completed and put into operation. WNP-3 and WNP-5 are located on 1,600 acres (650 ha) on the Satsop Site near Elma in Grays Harbor County, Washington. Today the site hosts the Satsop Business Park and the Overstock.com Call Center.

== History ==
WPPSS applied for a construction and operation permit in 1973, and both WNP-3 and WNP-5 started construction in 1977. Cost overruns led to major management changes at all five WPPSS nuclear plants in 1980. Bechtel was appointed the construction manager for WNP-1, 2 and 4 at Hanford and EBASCO brought in a new management team for WNP-3 and 5 at Elma.

WNP-3 was WPPSS's showcase project and construction advanced at an estimated rate of 2% per month under the leadership of the new management team brought in by EBASCO. Washington state voters put Initiative 394 (I-394) on the ballot for November 1981, which asked in its title "Shall public agencies obtain voter approval prior to issuing bonds for the construction or acquisition of major public energy projects?" I-394 was aimed directly at the five nuclear projects being built by WPPSS, with the Statement For, written by supporters, citing the rise in the estimated construction budget for the five plants, which had grown from an initial estimate of US$4.1 billion to US$24 billion. Despite being outspent by a margin of nearly seven-to-one, I-394 passed overwhelmingly, meaning that WPPSS would have to submit future bond issues to the public for a vote. Prior to I-394, WPPSS had the authority to issue bonds without voter consent as a municipal corporation.

Just a few years later, with the failure of WPPSS to sell nearly US$961,000,000 (equivalent to $3,206,090,000 in 2025) in bonds to complete the project, WNP-3 was placed in an extended construction delay in July 1983 while nearly 76 percent complete. Construction on WNP-5 was terminated in January 1982 while only 16 percent complete. Of the original five proposed nuclear units, only WNP-2 was completed and put into operation.

Equipment at WNP-3 was preserved to allow a restart of construction if regional energy demand warranted it. In 1994, the WPPSS board adopted a resolution to terminate WNP-3, and preservation funding was discontinued in 1995. Construction Permit CPPR-154 was terminated in 1999 and the ownership of the site was transferred to the Satsop Redevelopment Project.

=== Site reuse and redevelopment ===
Under contemporary plans, none of the existing structures were slated for demolition, although some equipment (such as the WNP-3 turbine) was to be removed and existing buildings were to be reconfigured to support the conversion of the site to an industrial, business or research park. Approximately 22 acres (8.9 ha) of the site were retained by WPPSS for development of a combustion turbine electric generating plant, which later came to fruition as the combined-cycle Grays Harbor Energy Center. Grays Harbor provides 650 MW of electric generation and came on-line in 2008, with an additional 650 MW of generation approved but not yet constructed.

In 2018, the grounds were used to store thousands of diesel Volkswagen vehicles that had been recalled as a result of the company's emissions scandal.

== Design ==
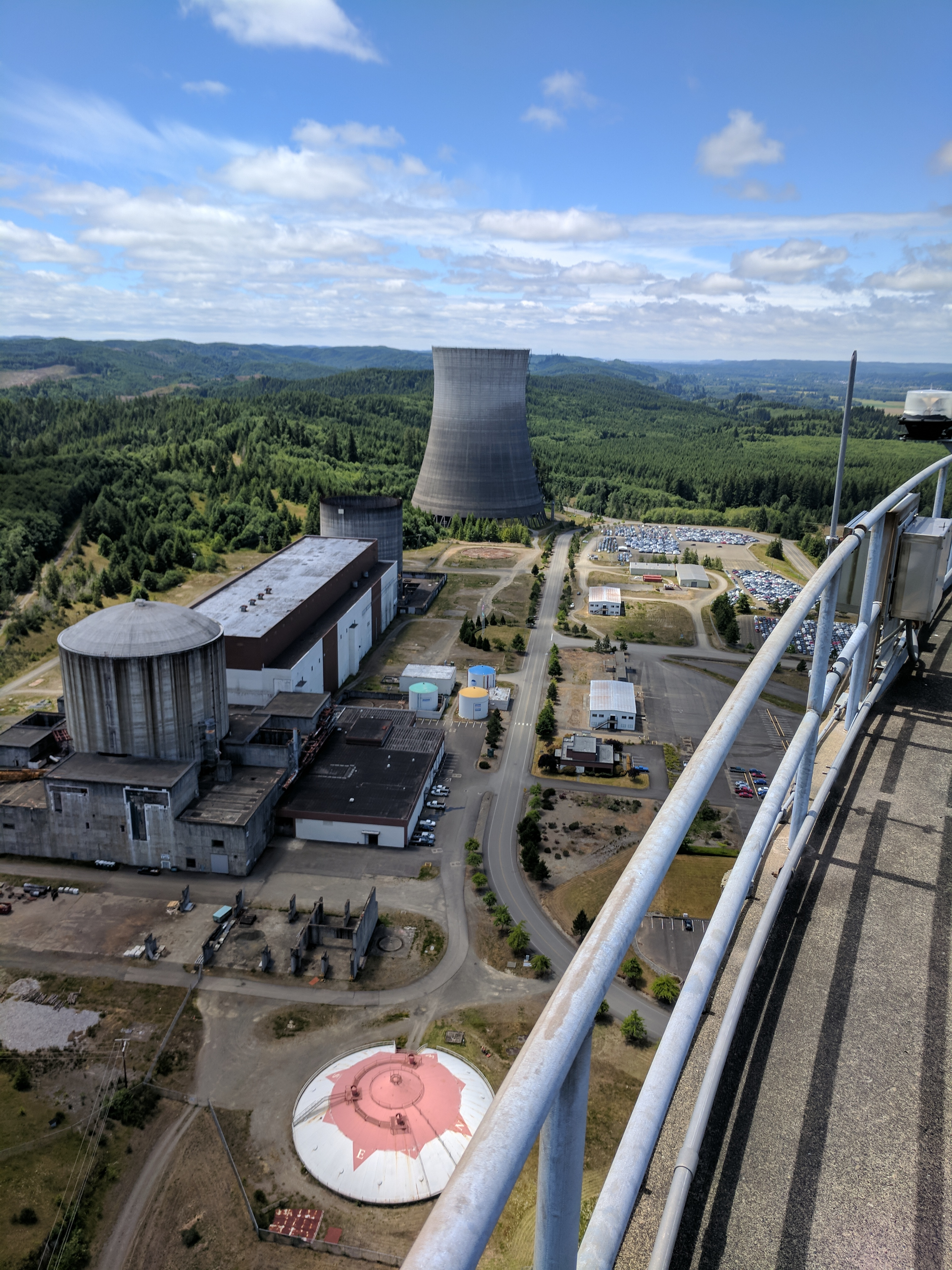
WNP-3/5

WNP-3/5 would have been pressurized water reactors, with the nuclear steam supply system provided by Combustion Engineering. The architect/engineer for the plant was EBASCO, who also were responsible for plant construction.

Like contemporary C-E designs, the System-80 NSSS in each unit would have featured a two-loop design, with two steam generators, four reactor coolant pumps and one pressurizer to maintain reactor coolant system pressure. The System-80 NSSS was designed to be capable of burning mixed-oxide (MOX) fuel.

== In popular culture ==
Since being abandoned, the site has served as the filming site for a number of projects. The site is operated as the Satsop Business Park by the Port of Grays Harbor, and daily filming rates were established in 2013. Local artist Etsuko Ichikawa filmed "Echo at Satsop" in 2013 as a reaction to the 2011 tsunami and subsequent nuclear disaster at Fukushima Daiichi.

An independent movie, Depth, based on the video game SOMA, was filmed at Satsop in 2014.

== See also ==
- List of nuclear reactors
- List of cancelled nuclear reactors in the United States
