= N-Reactor =

Coordinates: 46.674677°N 119.568672°W

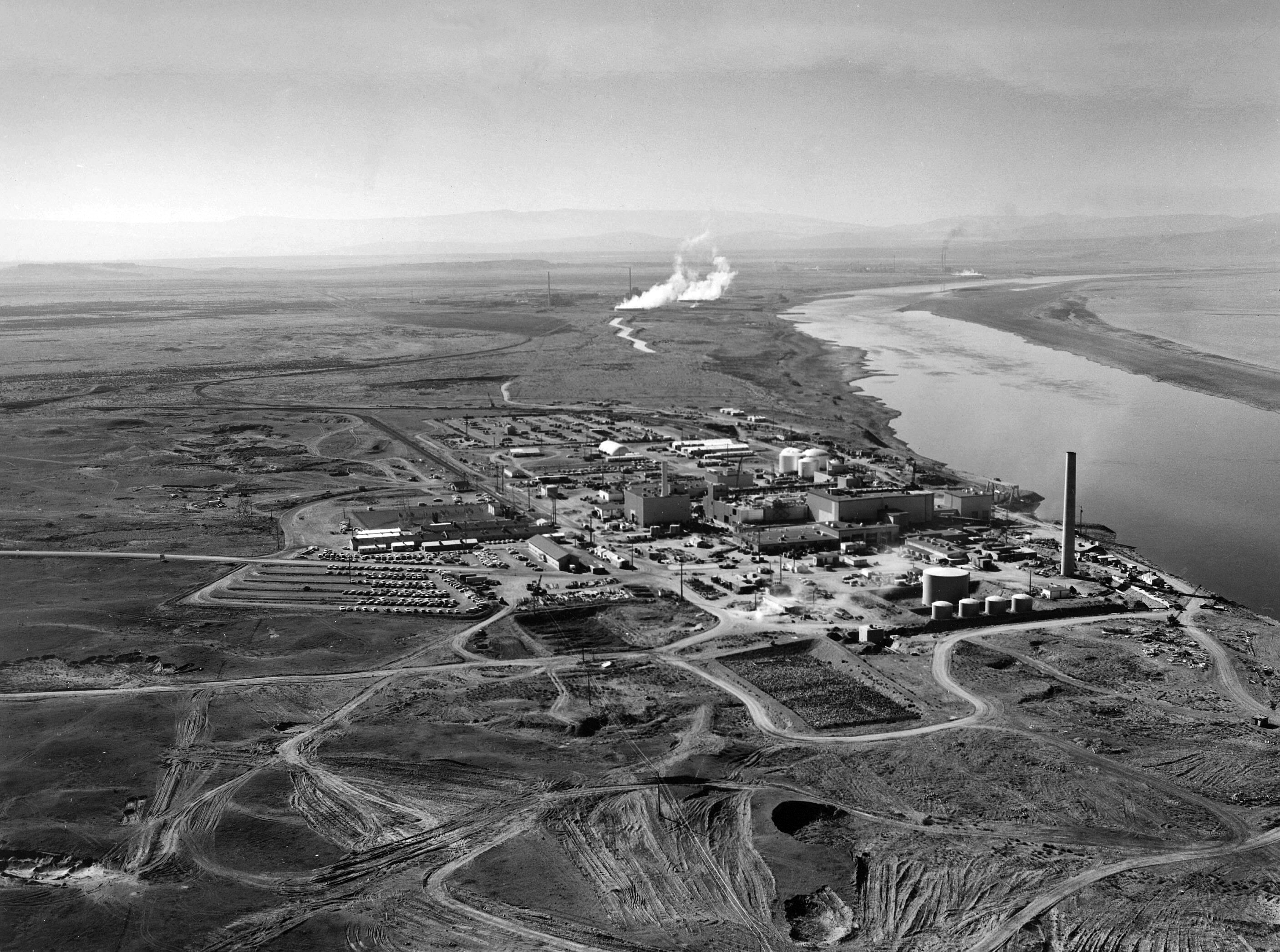
The N-Reactor at the Hanford site along the Columbia River.

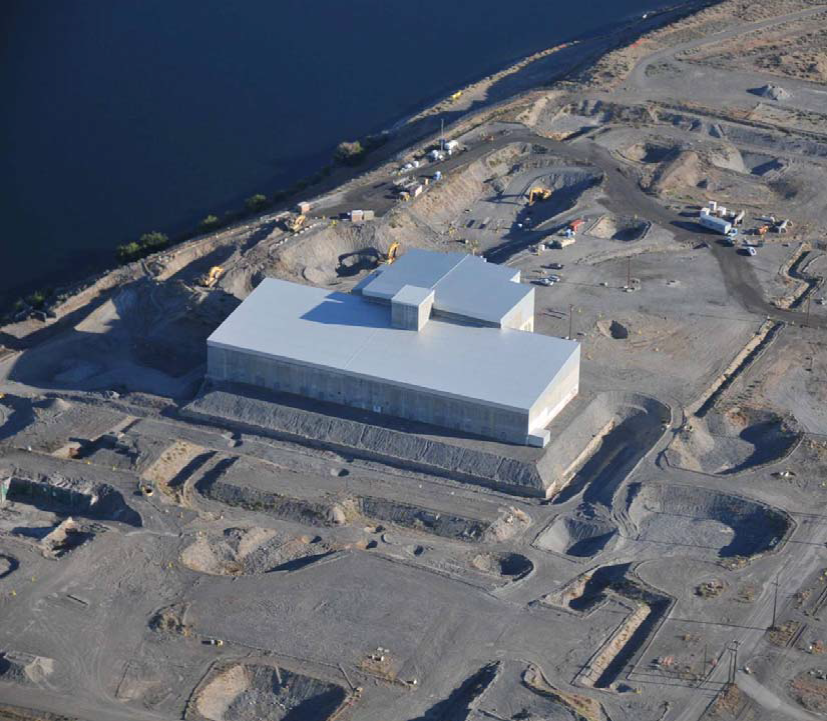
Aerial Photo of the N-Reactor. Taken January 2013.

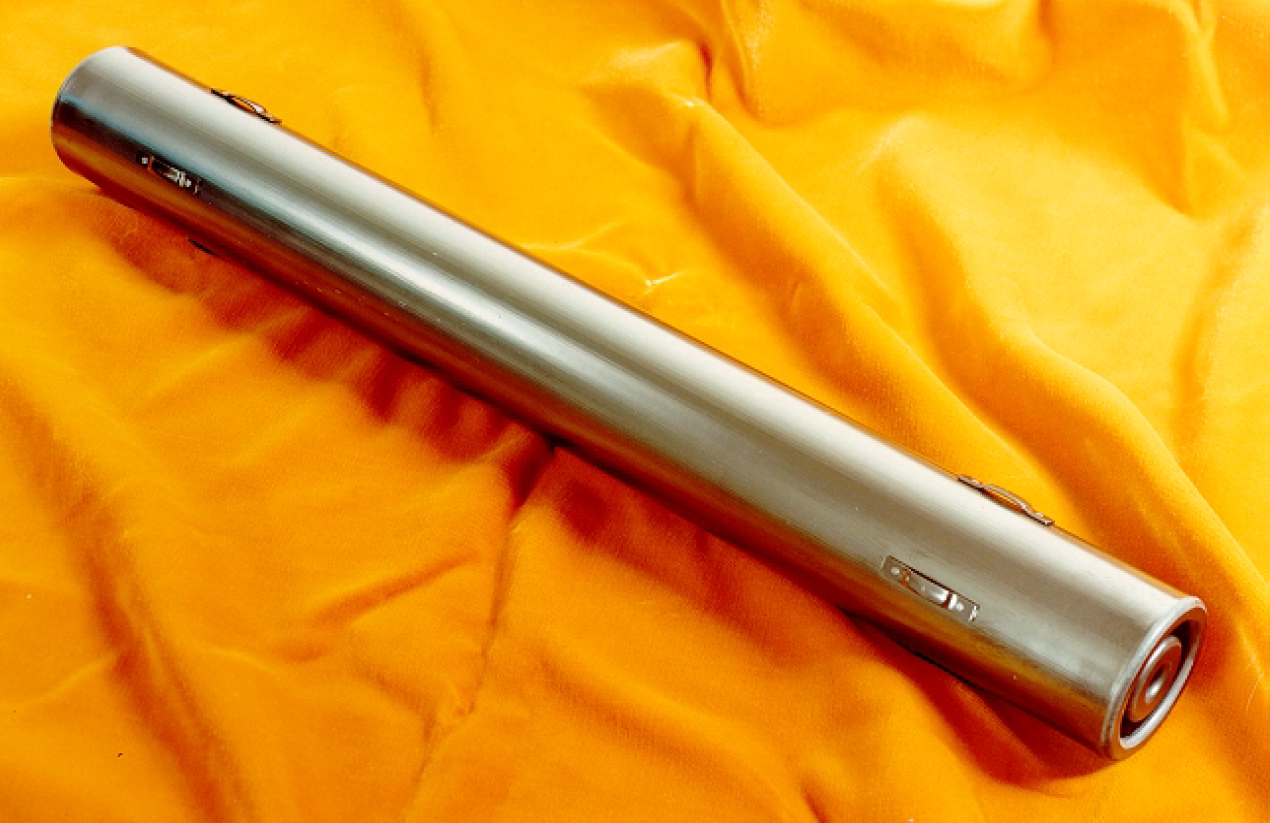
Fuel element from N-Reactor

The N-Reactor was a water/graphite-moderated nuclear reactor constructed during the Cold War and operated by the U.S. government at the Hanford Site in Washington; it began production in 1963.

It was a one-of-a-kind design in the U.S., being both a plutonium production reactor for nuclear weapons and, from 1966, producing steam to allow production of electricity to feed the civilian power grid via the Washington Public Power Supply System or WPPSS. The power rating of the N-Reactor was 4000 MWt, with a power output of 800 MWe at the power generating plant.

In an improvement on the earlier Hanford reactors, N-Reactor was built with a confinement building (although not a containment building). In the event of an accidental release of steam, air and steam would vent through filters that confined any radioactive particles present. It was partially moderated with graphite, but had a negative void coefficient due to also using moderation from the coolant water, meaning it was thermally stable.

The reactor was shut down in 1987, when the Secretary of Energy determined that no more plutonium was needed and placed on cold standby in 1988, with "final deactivation" beginning in 1994 and completing in 1998. Deactivation consisted of shutdown and isolation of operational systems and the cleanup of radiological and hazardous waste. N-Reactor (the 105-N Reactor and the 109-N Heat Exchanger Building) were placed in Interim Safe Storage (ISS) in 2012. ISS consists of the removal of the fuel storage basin, ancillary support facilities, and most portions of the shield wall that surround the 105-N Reactor. In addition, the 109-N Heat Exchanger Building was removed up to the steam generator cells. A new steel roof was installed over the remaining structures. Before and after pictures are found in the facility status change form. Final room status report of the current as-left condition of accessible rooms in the ISS has been documented.

== See also ==
- Nuclear power
- List of nuclear reactors
