= Energy Northwest =

Public power system in Washington, United States

- Type: Municipal corporation
- Industry: Public utility
- Founded: 1957; 69 years ago
- Headquarters: Richland, Washington, U.S.
- Products: Electricity
- Website: www.energy-northwest.com

Energy Northwest (formerly Washington Public Power Supply System) is a public power joint operating agency in the northwest United States, formed in 1957 by Washington state law to produce at-cost power for Northwest utilities. Headquartered in the Tri-Cities at Richland, Washington, the WPPSS became commonly (and derisively) known as "Whoops!", due to over-commitment to nuclear power in the 1970s which brought about financial collapse and the second largest municipal bond default in U.S. history. WPPSS was renamed Energy Northwest in November 1998, and agency membership includes 29 public power utilities, including 23 of the state's 29 public utility districts.

Energy Northwest is governed by two boards: an executive board and a board of directors. The executive board has 11 members: five representatives from the board of directors, three gubernatorial appointees and three public representatives selected by the board of directors. The board of directors includes a representative from each member utility.

The consortium's nuclear, hydro, wind, solar, and battery storage projects deliver nearly 1,400 megawatts of electricity to the Northwest power grid. Current power projects include White Bluffs Solar Station, Packwood Lake Hydroelectric Project, Nine Canyon Wind Project, Horn Rapids Solar, Storage and Training Project and Columbia Generating Station nuclear power plant.

Energy Northwest functions as a municipal corporation, similar to a town or city. That legal status allows the agency to issue public bonds to raise the financial capital necessary to build additional power generating and other public utility facilities.

The agency also provides a variety of business services in the energy, power generation and technical fields, including a range of project management and facility operations and maintenance services.

== History ==
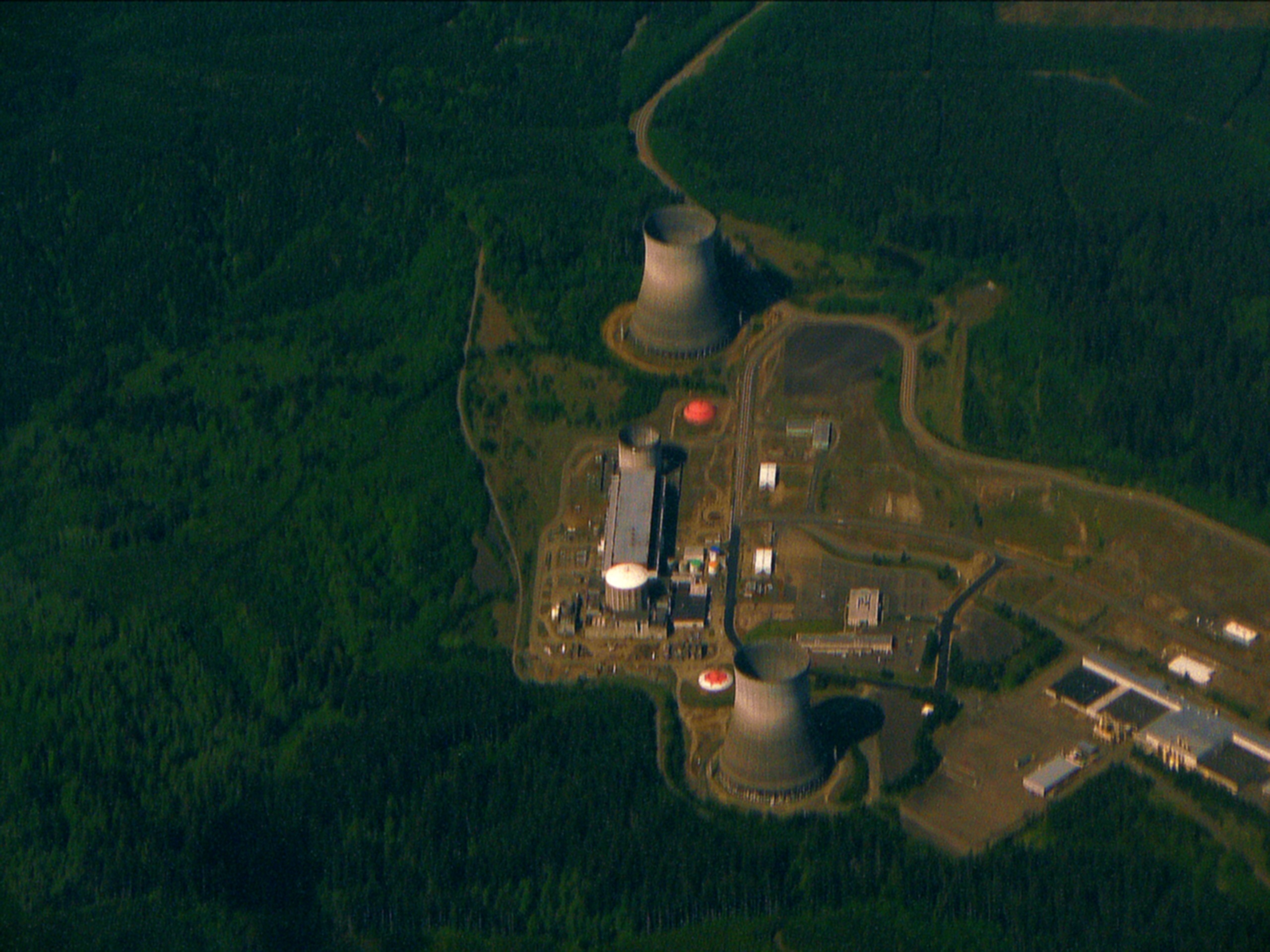
Washington Public Power Supply System Nuclear Power Plants 3 and 5 were never completed.

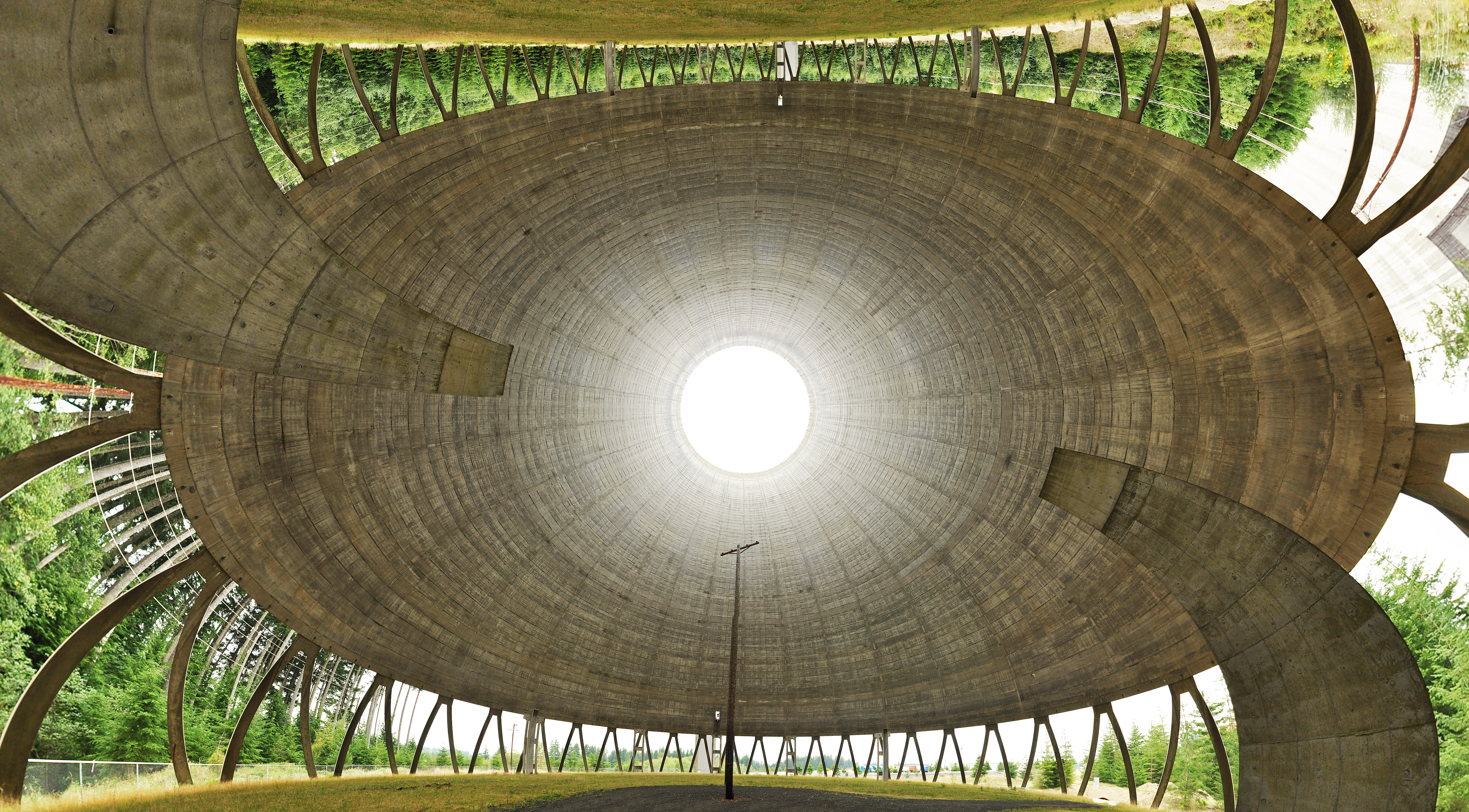
Inside an incomplete Satsop cooling tower - Mercator projection

The public power movement gained prominence in the 1920s and 1930s under the leadership of the Washington State Grange, a non-partisan, grassroots advocacy group for rural citizens with both legislative programs and community activities. Public utility districts were created to provide reliable, low-cost power for the growing state.

On January 31, 1957, the state legislature created the Washington Public Power Supply System, now known as Energy Northwest, as a joint operating agency to share the risks and rewards of building and operating electrical generating facilities. The power was to be provided, at the cost of production, to the ratepayers of those public utilities participating in the agency's new projects.

The first generating source to be developed was the Packwood Lake Hydroelectric Project, located in Lewis County, Washington State approximately 20 miles south of Mount Rainier. The 27.5 megawatt project was designed to produce electricity while protecting the natural environment. Packwood continues to produce power into its sixth decade of operation. In February 2008, Energy Northwest submitted an application to renew the project's operating license to the Federal Energy Regulatory Commission. In October 2018, FERC issued the renewed operating license to Energy Northwest to operate and maintain the project for a period of 40 years.

In September 1962, Congress passed and President John F. Kennedy signed a bill authorizing construction of a new dual-purpose nuclear reactor (the N Reactor) on the Hanford Nuclear Reservation. It was designed to produce both weapons-grade plutonium and steam to power turbine generators – thus its designation as a dual-purpose reactor. With support from U.S. Senator Henry "Scoop" Jackson, the agency made a successful pitch to be the non-federal operator of the steam generator half of the project. President Kennedy presided over the groundbreaking in September 1963. Commercial operation of the 860-megawatt Hanford Generating Project began in April 1966.

For the agency, under the regionally developed Hydro-Thermal Power Program, the 1970s brought the challenge of attempting to simultaneously construct multiple nuclear power plants. Over-commitment to nuclear power brought about the financial collapse of the Washington Public Power Supply System, which undertook to build five large nuclear power plants in the 1970s. Other groups, including the city of Seattle, questioned the feasibility of the project. In July 1976, the Seattle City Council voted against participating in the building of the project 4 and 5 nuclear power plants based, citing a 12-volume study that recommended a program of conservation and alternative energy sources instead of participation in the nuclear plants.

Managing director Neil Strand resigned in February 1980, after being under fire for several months due to the cost overruns and construction delays at the five nuclear power plants. He had been in the lead position for nearly three years.

=== Default ===
In January 1982, cost overruns and delays, along with a slowing of electricity demand growth, led to cancellation of two WPPSS plants and a construction halt on the two-reactor Satsop Nuclear Power Plant which was 75% complete. Seventeen months later in June 1983, the Washington State Supreme Court ruled the long-term take-or-pay contracts to buy the power produced by the project were illegal. The next month, in July 1983, WPPSS defaulted on $2.25 billion of municipal bonds, which is the second largest municipal bond default in U.S. history. The court case that followed took nearly a decade to resolve, and WPPSS acquired the nickname "Whoops" in the media.

=== After default ===
Fuel loading at Columbia Generating Station began on December 25, 1983, and proceeded at a rate of 50 fuel assemblies per day. The process was completed January 12, 1984, and Columbia was declared in commercial operation December 13, 1984. On January 19, 2010, Energy Northwest submitted an application to the Nuclear Regulatory Commission for a 20-year license renewal of Columbia Generating Station. This renewal was granted in May 2012 and the 1116 megawatt plant is currently licensed for operation to December 20, 2043.

The agency built and continues to operate White Bluffs Solar Station demonstration project, which was dedicated in May 2002. The low-maintenance, environmentally friendly project uses 242 photovoltaic panels to reach a production capacity of 38.7 kilowatts DC.

Energy Northwest next built and continues to operate the region's first public power wind project – Nine Canyon Wind Project. It was dedicated in October 2002, with a second phase going online in December 2003, and the third and final phase in service in May 2008, bringing the total capacity to 95.9 megawatts.

Energy Northwest's latest development is the Horn Rapids Solar, Storage and Training project which went online in November 2020. The project is a 4-megawatt direct current solar generating array of photovoltaic panels, owned and operated by Tucci Energy Services. Energy Northwest owns and operates the co-located 1-MW/4MWh battery energy storage system.

== Members ==
- Asotin County PUD
- Benton County PUD
- Centralia City Light
- Chelan County PUD
- City of Port Angeles
- City of Richland
- Clallam County Public Utility District(former member)
- Clallam County
- Clark Public Utilities
- Cowlitz County PUD
- Douglas County PUD
- Ferry County PUD
- Franklin County PUD
- Grant County PUD
- Grays Harbor County PUD
- Jefferson County PUD
- Kittitas County PUD
- Klickitat County PUD
- Lewis County PUD
- Mason County PUD 1
- Mason County PUD 3
- Okanogan County PUD
- Pacific County PUD 2
- Pend Oreille PUD
- Seattle City Light
- Skamania County PUD
- Snohomish County PUD
- Tacoma Public Utilities
- Wahkiakum County PUD
- Whatcom County PUD

== See also ==
- Nuclear Implosions: The Rise and Fall of the Washington Public Power Supply System
