= North Bend Ranger Station =

- U.S. National Register of Historic Places
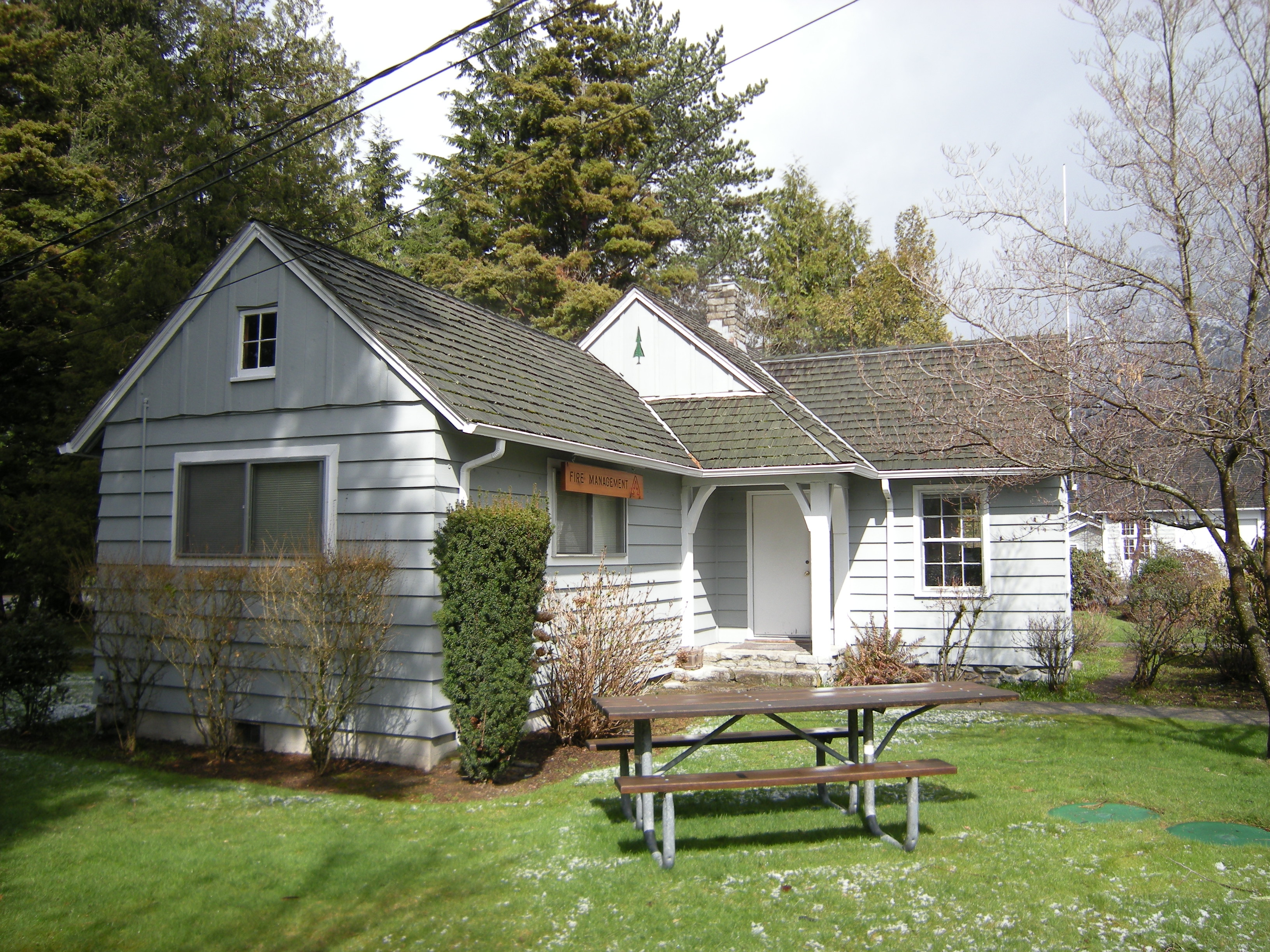
- North Bend Ranger Station

- Location within Washington (state) Location within the United States
- Location: 42404 SE. North Bend Way, North Bend, Washington
- Coordinates: 47°29′23″N 121°46′20″W
- Area: 7.9 acres (3.2 ha)
- Built: 1936
- Built by: Civilian Conservation Corps (CCC)
- Architect: Multiple
- Architectural style: Rustic architecture of USDA
- MPS: USDA Forest Service Administrative Buildings in Oregon and Washington Built by the CCC MPS
- NRHP reference No.: 91000157
- Added to NRHP: March 6, 1991

The North Bend Ranger Station is a collection of buildings operated by the USDA Forest Service in the Mount Baker-Snoqualmie National Forest. Constructed by the Civilian Conservation Corps (CCC) in 1936, it was added to the National Register of Historic Places in 1991. The multiple buildings indicate the expansion of Forest Service responsibilities from custodial supervision to extensive resource management. North Bend Ranger Station is considered historic both for its distinctive rustic architecture and for its association with the federal New Deal programs.

== Description ==
North Bend Ranger Station consists of eight buildings that contribute to the historical designation, as well as eight additional buildings. The architectural style of the buildings is described as "distinctive Pacific Northwest rustic". The historical buildings are:

- The recreation office is a one-story wood-frame building, 28 by 55.6 feet (8.5 m × 16.9 m), built in 1936.
- The equipment repair shop is a one-story wood-frame building built in 1936 and joined to an adjacent 3-bay shop in 1938.
- The fire office is a one-story wood-frame building, 29 by 38 feet (8.8 m × 11.6 m), built in 1937.
- The warehouse is a 1 1/2-story wood-frame building, 50 by 50 feet (15 m × 15 m), also known as Mount Baker-Snoqualmie National Forest Fire Warehouse
- The crew house is a one-story wood-frame building, built in 1936.
- Two residences with garages are both 1 1/2-story wood-frame buildings/
- The storage building is a one-story wood-frame building, built in 1935.

== History ==
The CCC was a federal emergency work program dedicated to the stewardship of America's natural resources which provided work for unemployed young men and used the enrollees to work on conservation projects. Managed by the United States Army, individual camps and work projects were directed by cooperating agencies. The men of Camp North Bend, directed by the National Forest Service, built the North Bend Ranger Station.

The warehouse building is now a visitor information center and an entrance pass sales outlet for Mount Baker-Snoqualmie National Forest and other federal lands. The conference hall is used for training, education, and public meetings.

== See also ==
- Camp North Bend
- National Register of Historic Places listings in King County, Washington
