= Camp North Bend =

- U.S. National Register of Historic Places
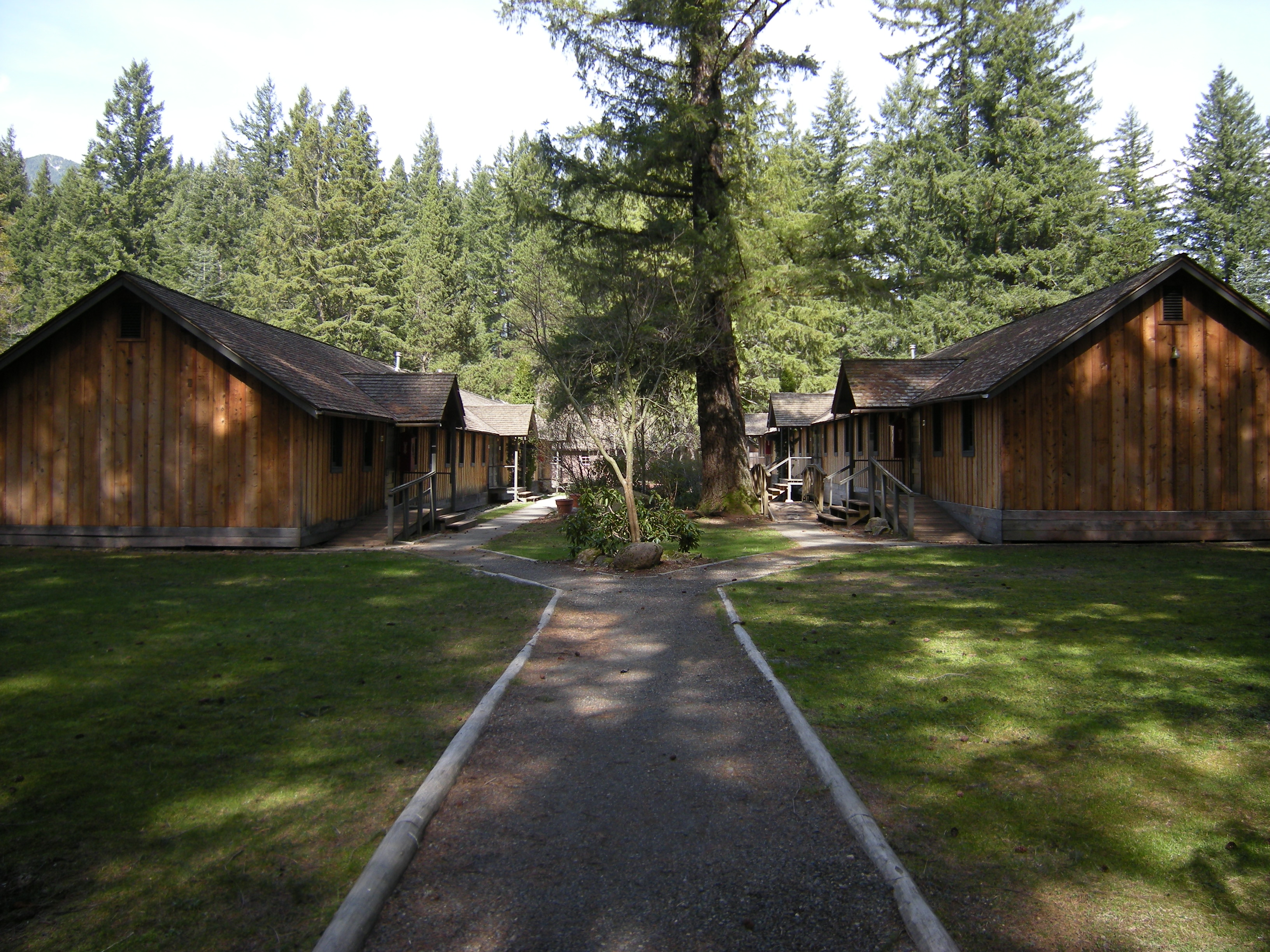
- Camp North Bend

- Location within Washington (state) Location within the United States
- Location: 45509 SE. 150th St., North Bend, Washington 98045
- Coordinates: 47°28′9.8″N 121°43′55.829″W
- Area: 9.5 acres (3.8 ha)
- Built: 1935
- Built by: Civilian Conservation Corps (CCC)
- Architectural style: Vernacular, Rustic Style
- NRHP reference No.: 93000372
- Added to NRHP: April 29, 1993

Camp North Bend, also known as Camp Waskowitz, is a 9 1/2 acre complex of wood-frame buildings. Constructed by and for the Civilian Conservation Corps (CCC) in 1935, it was added to the National Register of Historic Places in 1993. It is the only intact example of CCC work camp design and construction in King County, Washington. The site is now used by the Highline School District for an outdoor school program focused on environmental education.

== History ==
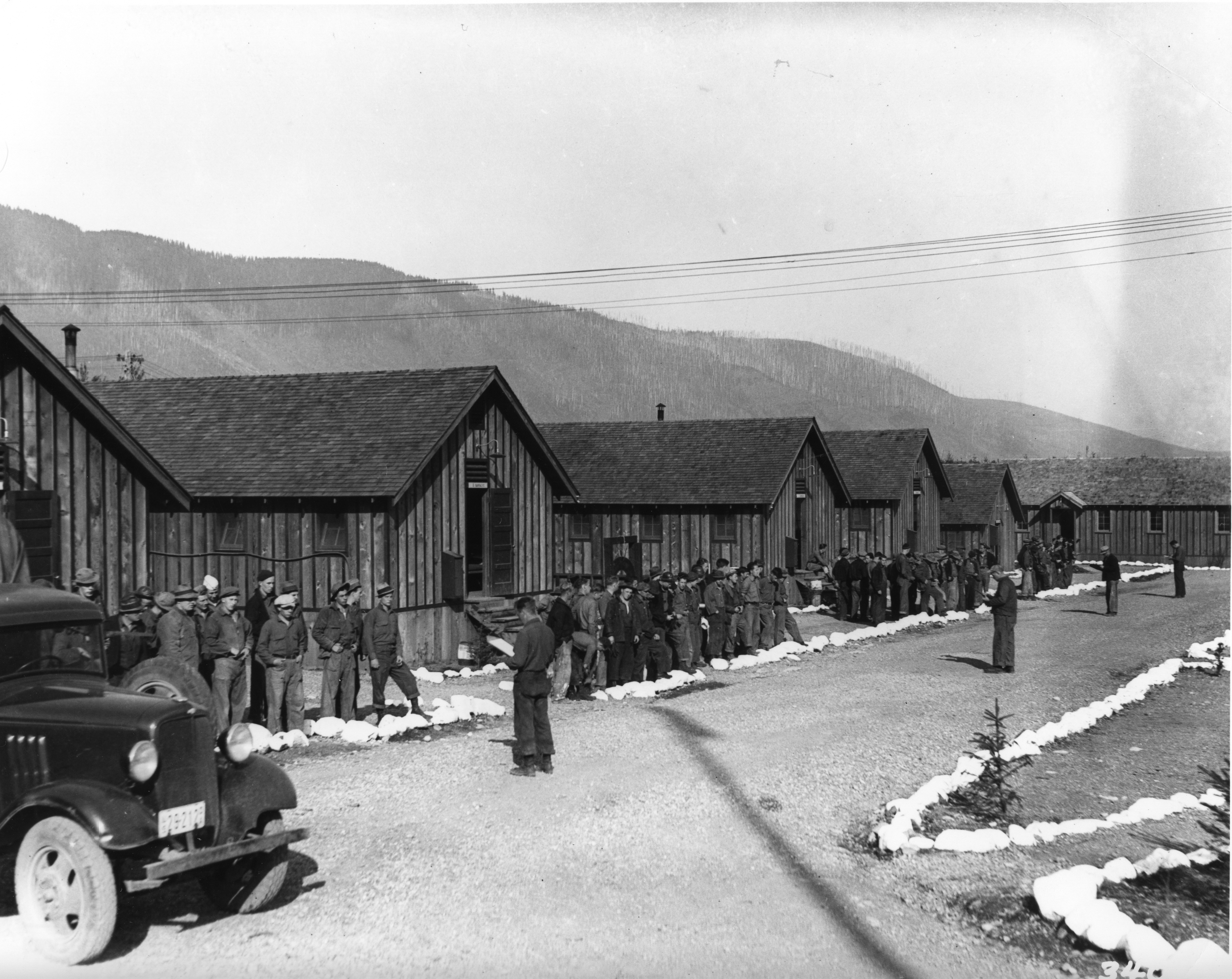
Morning roll call at Camp North Bend

The CCC was a federal emergency work program dedicated to the stewardship of America's natural resources which provided work for unemployed young men and used the enrollees to work on conservation projects. Managed by the United States Army, individual camps and work projects were directed by cooperating agencies. Camp North Bend was directed by the National Forest Service. Built in four months to house 200 men, CCC enrollees at this camp built roads, cleared brush, burned logging slash, fought forest fires, and planted trees. The men of the camp also built the North Bend Ranger Station.

Camp North Bend is an example of standard CCC design, originally containing four barracks (two pairs connected by common latrines), officers’ quarters, a kitchen/mess hall, a recreation building, an infirmary, education building and other associated support service buildings (including a garage and worksheds). The camp is sited on the banks of the South Fork of the Snoqualmie River, east of North Bend, Washington.

Camp North Bend was closed in 1942. It was later used by the King County Sheriff's Department as a youth recreation camp, when the camp was renamed Camp Waskowitz in honor of a former University of Washington football player killed in World War II. The camp was transferred to the Highline School District in 1958.

== Current uses ==
Camp Waskowitz is currently operated by Highline Public Schools for their Environmental Learning Program. For some years, the National Association of CCC Alumni held its annual meeting at the camp.

Other activities that have been held at Camp Waskowitz include free summer camps for young people with muscular dystrophy and related neuromuscular diseases and women's workshops in fishing, hunting, and outdoor skills
