= Riverpoint, Washington =

- Census-designated place
- Location in Washington
- Coordinates: 47°29′03″N 121°42′54″W
- Country: United States
- State: Washington
- County: King

Area
  - Total: 1.31 sq mi (3.38 km^{2})
  - Land: 1.27 sq mi (3.28 km^{2})
  - Water: 0.035 sq mi (0.09 km^{2})
- Elevation: 751 ft (229 m)

Population (2020)
  - Total: 774
- Time zone: UTC-8 (Pacific (PST))
  - Summer (DST): UTC-7 (PDT)
- ZIP code: 98045
- Area code: 425
- FIPS code: 53-58768
- GNIS feature ID: 2807188

Riverpoint is an unincorporated community and census-designated place (CDP) in east King County, Washington, United States. As of the 2020 census, it had a population of 774. At the 2010 census, the area was listed as the Tanner CDP and had a population of 1,018 over a larger area.

In 2010, the Tanner CDP ranked 46th out of 522 communities in the state of Washington for per capita income.

== Geography ==
Riverpoint is located in the valley of the Middle and South Forks of the Snoqualmie River and is bordered to the southwest by the city of North Bend.

According to the United States Census Bureau, the Riverpoint CDP has a total area of 1.31 square miles (3.38 km^{2}), of which 1.27 square miles (3.28 km^{2}) are land and 0.03 square miles (0.09 km^{2}), or 2.73%, are water. In 2010, the Tanner CDP had a total area of 4.03 square miles (10.45 km^{2}).

Riverpoint is served by Exit 32 on Interstate 90, at the base of Mount Si, which rises to the north. The community is surrounded by miles of hiking trails located in Washington State Forest Reserves. The most popular hiking trail in the area is the Mount Si Trail.

== Demographics ==
Historical population
| Census | Pop. | Note | %± |
|---|---|---|---|
| 2000 | 2,966 | | — |
| 2010 | 1,018 | | −65.7% |
| 2020 | 774 | | −24.0% |
U.S. Decennial Census

The community first appeared as a census designated place under the name Tanner in the 2000 U.S. census. The CDP was renamed as Riverpoint for the 2020 U.S. census.

=== Racial and ethnic composition ===
Riverpoint CDP, Washington – Racial and ethnic composition Note: the US Census treats Hispanic/Latino as an ethnic category. This table excludes Latinos from the racial categories and assigns them to a separate category. Hispanics/Latinos may be of any race.
| Race / Ethnicity (NH = Non-Hispanic) | Pop 2000 | Pop 2010 | Pop 2020 | % 2000 | % 2010 | % 2020 |
|---|---|---|---|---|---|---|
| White alone (NH) | 2,761 | 945 | 684 | 93.09% | 92.83% | 88.37% |
| Black or African American alone (NH) | 10 | 0 | 1 | 0.34% | 0.00% | 0.13% |
| Native American or Alaska Native alone (NH) | 28 | 8 | 8 | 0.94% | 0.79% | 1.03% |
| Asian alone (NH) | 36 | 15 | 13 | 1.21% | 1.47% | 1.68% |
| Native Hawaiian or Pacific Islander alone (NH) | 4 | 0 | 0 | 0.13% | 0.00% | 0.00% |
| Other race alone (NH) | 2 | 6 | 5 | 0.07% | 0.59% | 0.65% |
| Mixed race or Multiracial (NH) | 57 | 24 | 45 | 1.92% | 2.36% | 5.81% |
| Hispanic or Latino (any race) | 68 | 20 | 18 | 2.29% | 1.96% | 2.33% |
| Total | 2,966 | 1,018 | 774 | 100.00% | 100.00% | 100.00% |

=== 2000 census ===
At the 2000 census there were 2,966 people, 1,055 households, and 835 families in the Tanner CDP. The population density was 489.0 people per square mile (188.7/km^{2}). There were 1,087 housing units at an average density of 179.2/sq mi (69.1/km^{2}). The racial makeup of the CDP was 94.10% White, 0.37% African American, 0.98% Native American, 1.21% Asian, 0.13% Pacific Islander, 0.84% from other races, and 2.36% from two or more races. Hispanic or Latino of any race were 2.29%.

Of the 1,055 households 41.8% had children under the age of 18 living with them, 69.1% were married couples living together, 7.3% had a female householder with no husband present, and 20.8% were non-families. 14.8% of households were one person and 2.2% were one person aged 65 or older. The average household size was 2.81 and the average family size was 3.12.

The age distribution was 29.3% under the age of 18, 5.9% from 18 to 24, 33.5% from 25 to 44, 25.7% from 45 to 64, and 5.6% 65 or older. The median age was 36 years. For every 100 females there were 105.8 males. For every 100 females age 18 and over, there were 102.9 males.

The median household income was $73,105 and the median family income was $78,021. Males had a median income of $52,140 versus $31,923 for females. The per capita income for the CDP was $28,604. About 1.5% of families and 4.5% of the population were below the poverty line, including 1.1% of those under age 18 and 24.3% of those age 65 or over.
