= McGrath Cafe and Hotel =

- McGrath Cafe and Hotel (The McGrath)
- U.S. National Register of Historic Places
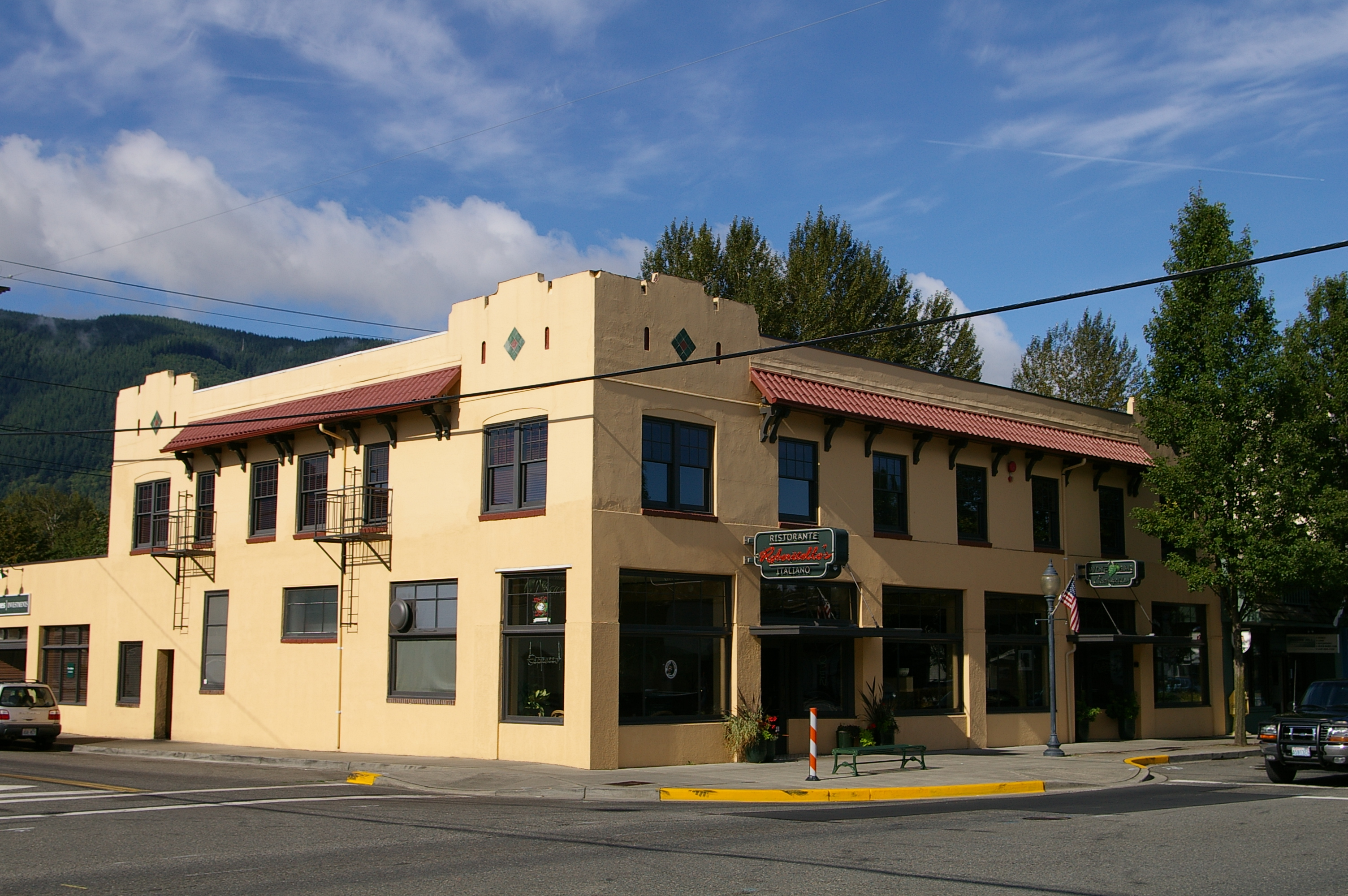
- The McGrath

- Location within Washington (state) Location within the United States
- Location: 101 W. North Bend Way, North Bend, Washington
- Coordinates: 47°29′42″N 121°47′05″W
- Area: less than one acre
- Built: 1922
- Built by: William Blaisdell; Herb Johnson
- Architect: Stuart & Wheatley
- Architectural style: Mission/Spanish Revival
- NRHP reference No.: 02000089
- Added to NRHP: February 21, 2002

The McGrath Cafe and Hotel, also known as The McGrath, is a commercial building in North Bend, Washington. Built in 1922, it was added to the National Register of Historic Places in 2002. The McGrath is also a contributing building in the North Bend Historic Commercial District of King County, Washington.

== Description ==
The McGrath is a two-story wood-frame and concrete building measuring 60 by 75 feet (18 m × 23 m) with a 30 by 42 feet (9.1 m × 12.8 m) addition in the rear. The Spanish eclectic exterior was finished in stucco which was painted an earthy yellow.

During its peak years, The McGrath had about 45 rooms, a prominent brick fireplace, a tavern, two cafes, a dining room, a dance floor and a 16-foot-long soda fountain which was popular with local teenagers. A 1923 advertisement told parents "If your daughter or son is dancing at McGrath's in the evening we want to assure you that they are in as good environment as when at home."

In 1938, a new banquet room was added. Jack McGrath added various dramatic signs over the years, and, in 1948, The McGrath boasted a 20-foot-tall neon sign, "North Bend's Famous McGrath's Cafe", supported by a superstructure on the roof.

== History ==
Jack McGrath immigrated to Seattle from England as an infant in the late 1800s. After years of managing cafes and hotels in various locations, McGrath and his wife Merrill moved to North Bend. After their first cafe at a different location burned down, he decided to rebuild on a site of two vacant lots that he had purchased. McGrath's Cafe was built in 1922 on Washington's first automobile route across the Cascade Mountains, ideal for providing food for travelers. Jack McGrath added a second-floor hotel in 1926 as auto tourism was increasing, "in time for the early spring travelers". Architects for the hotel were B. Dudley Stuart and Arthur Wheatley. McGrath sold the cafe and hotel in 1944; the new owners continued to operate it as the McGrath Cafe and Hotel for the next seven years.

== Restoration ==
After several ownership changes over the years, Susan and Dale Sherman bought the hotel and spent 16 months renovating the building, using old photographs for reference. They received the 2002 John D. Spellman Award for Exemplary Achievement in Historic Preservation for their restoration of the McGrath Hotel. The restored building housed Robertiello's Ristorante Italiano, with offices in the old hotel rooms. The building later became Boxley's Jazz Club. In 2014, the owners of Boxley's Jazz Club donated the building to The Boxley Music Fund, a non-profit 501c3 organization. Today, it is the Iron Duck Public House.
