= Olallie State Park =

State park in Washington (state), United States

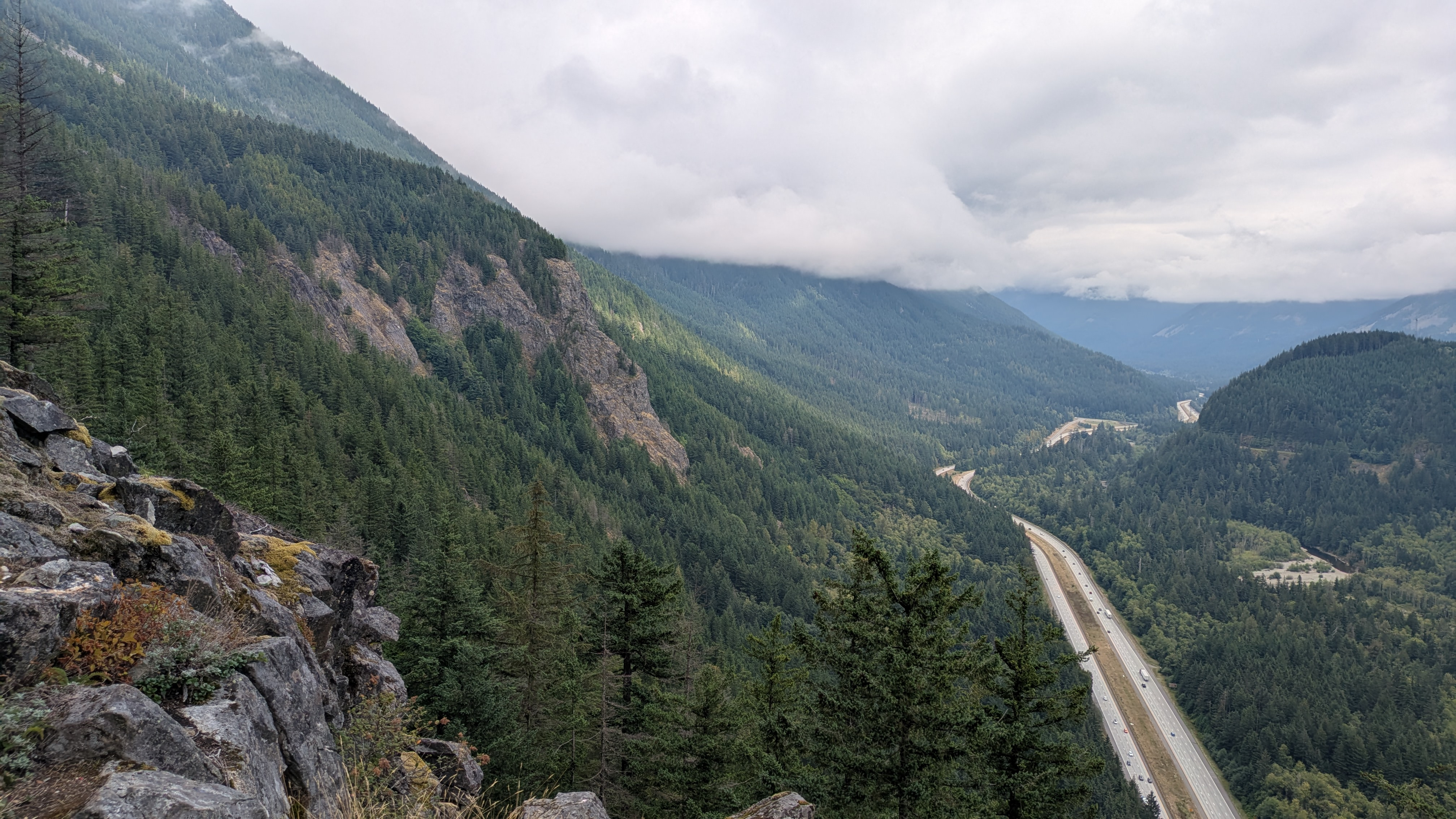
- Dirty Harry's Balcony (left, above the highway), a popular viewpoint

- Location within Washington (state) Location within the United States
- Location: King County, Washington, United States
- Coordinates: 47°26′41″N 121°41′48″W
- Area: 2,329 acres (943 ha)
- Elevation: 866 ft (264 m)
- Established: 1950
- Administrator: Washington State Parks and Recreation Commission
- Website: Official website

Olallie State Park is a public recreation area featuring multiple waterfalls located five miles (8.0 km) southeast of North Bend, Washington. The state park spans a 3.5-mile (5.6 km) stretch along the South Fork of the Snoqualmie River. The most prominent feature of the park is 135-foot-high (41 m) Twin Falls.

== History ==
The park originated in 1950, when Washington State Parks purchased a 160-acre parcel from Puget Sound Power and Light. Originally named Twin Falls State Park, following the park's expansion in 1976 its name was changed to Olallie, after the Chinook Jargon word for the berries which are common in the park.

== Features ==
The park features old-growth forests and five notable waterfalls: Twin Falls, Middle Twin Falls, Upper Twin Falls, Weeks Falls, and Upper Weeks Falls.

Twin Falls features a well-hidden underground run-of-the-river hydroelectric project that generates 24 MW of electricity. The powerhouse is located 325 feet (99 m) below ground.

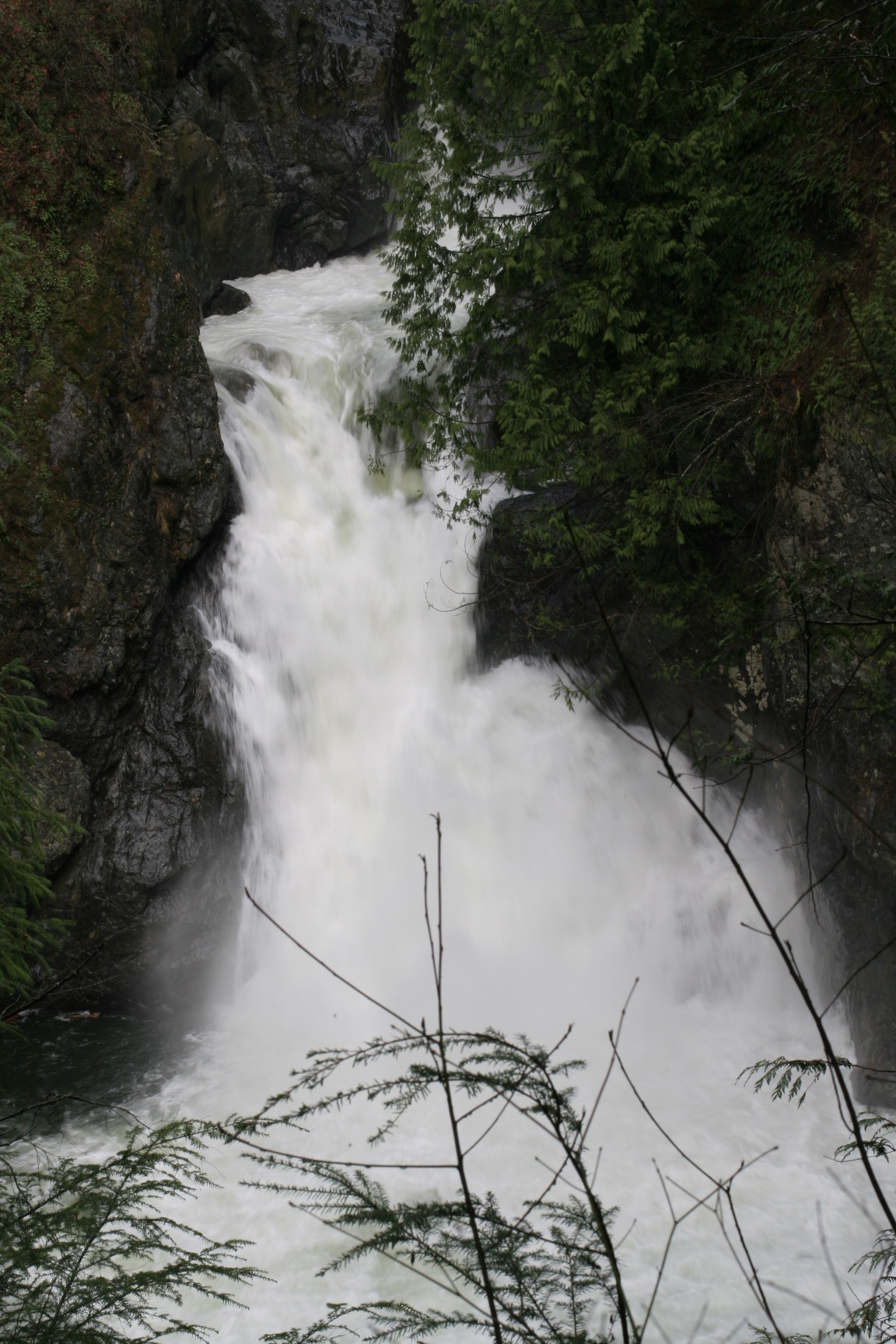
Upper Twin Falls

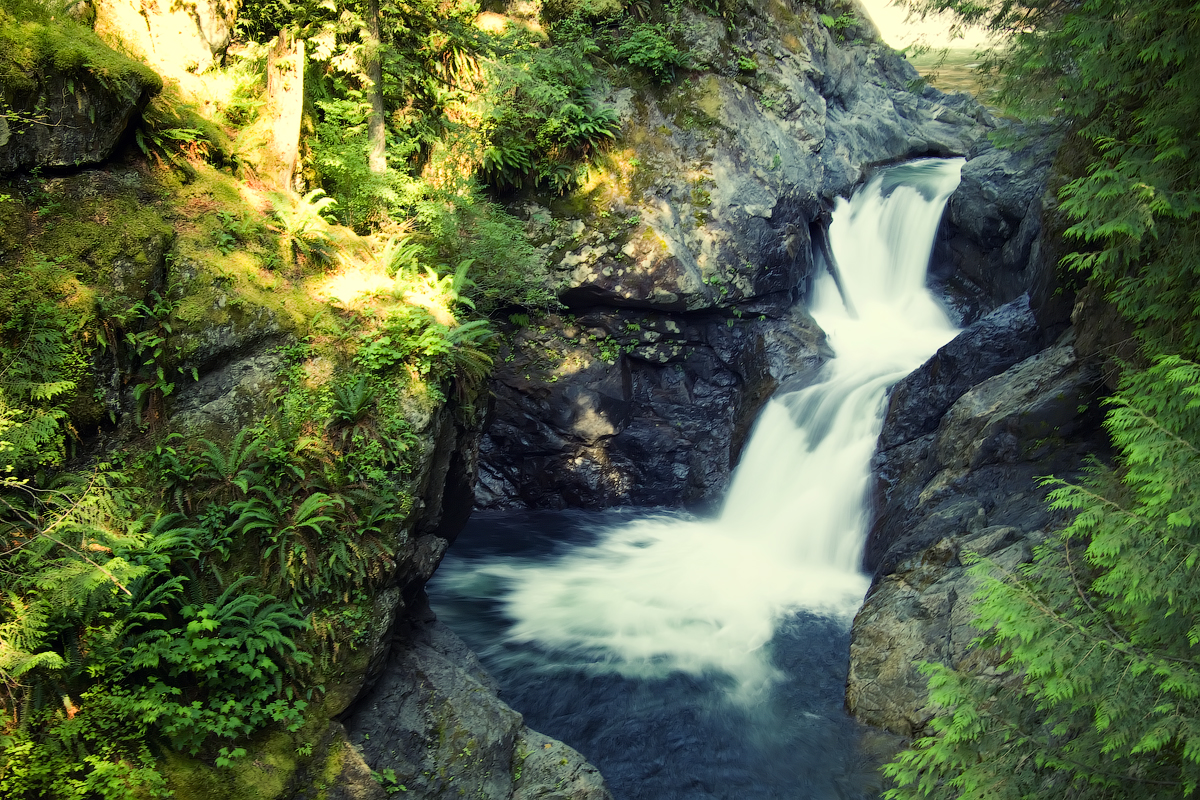
Middle Twin Falls

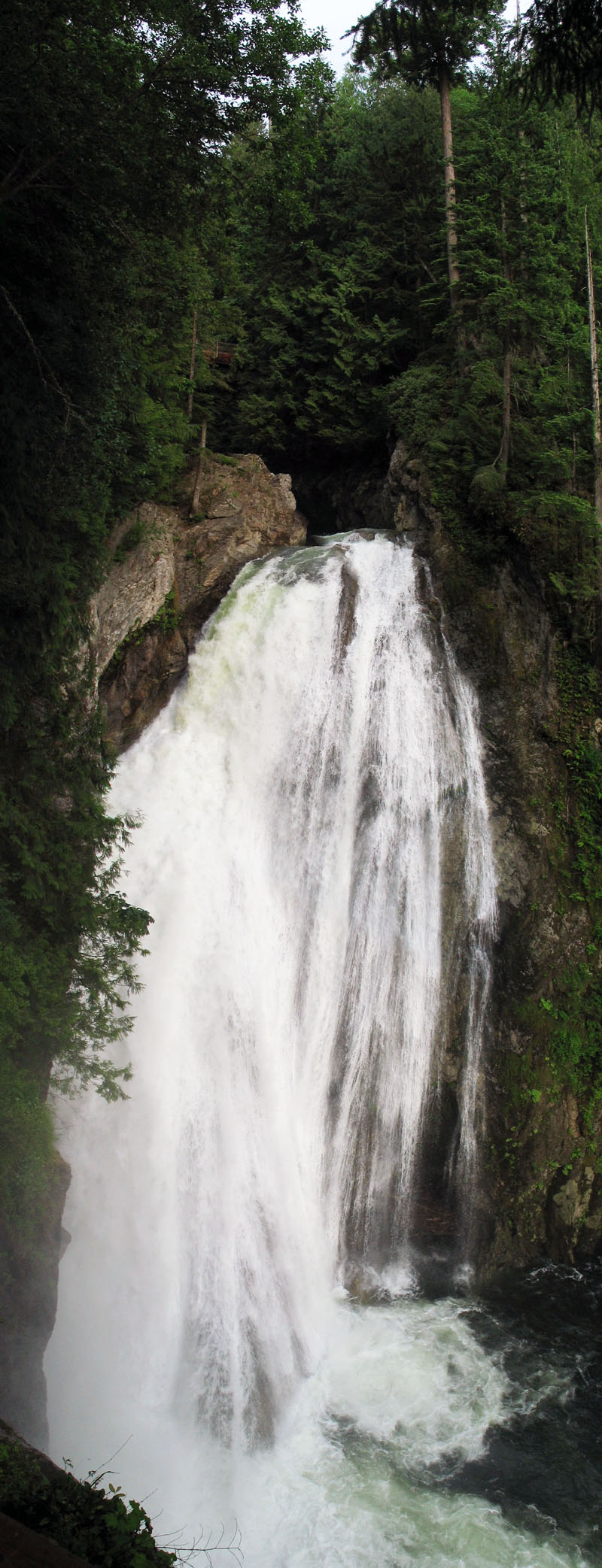
Lower Fall of Twin Falls

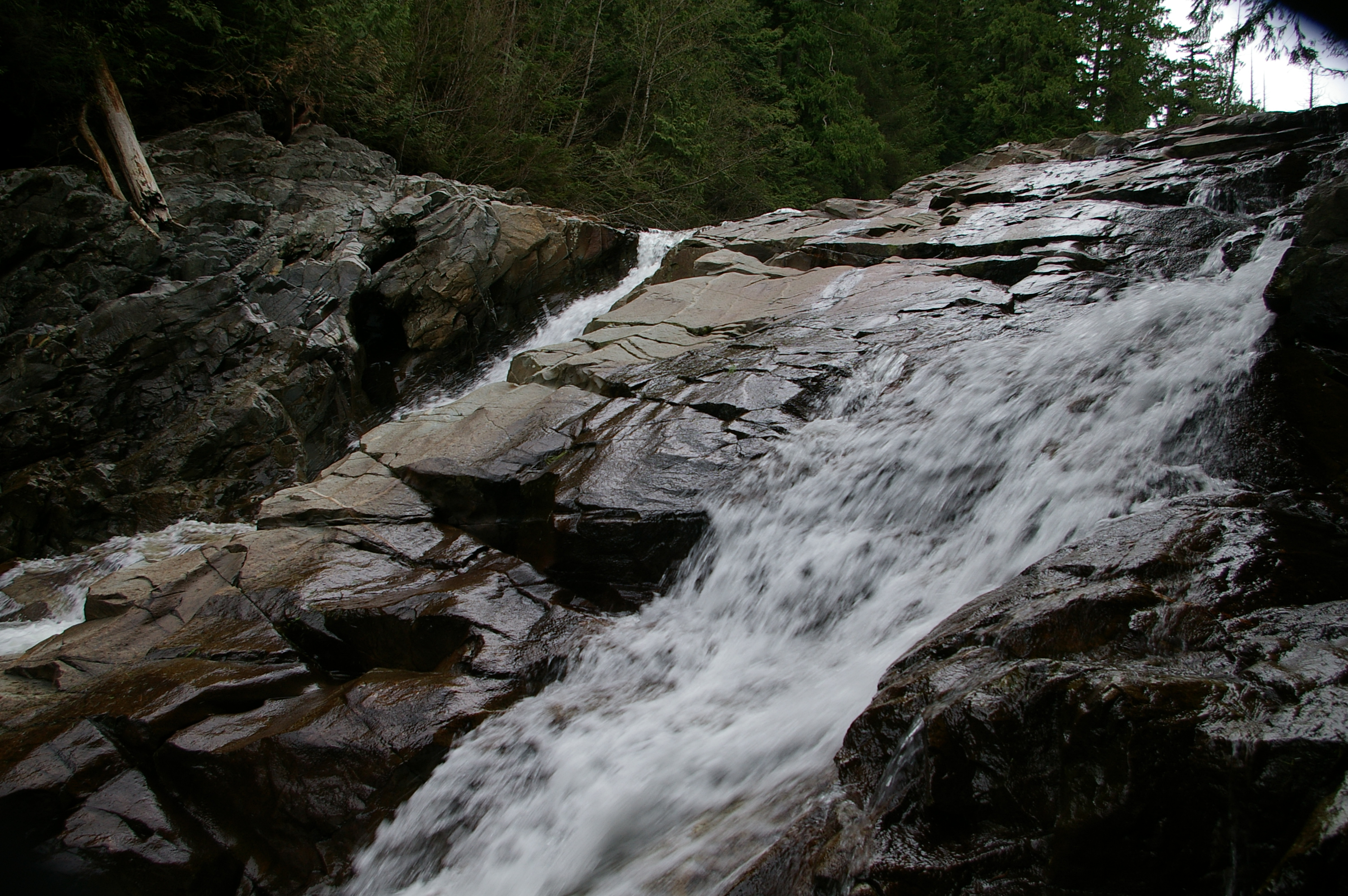
Upper Weeks Falls

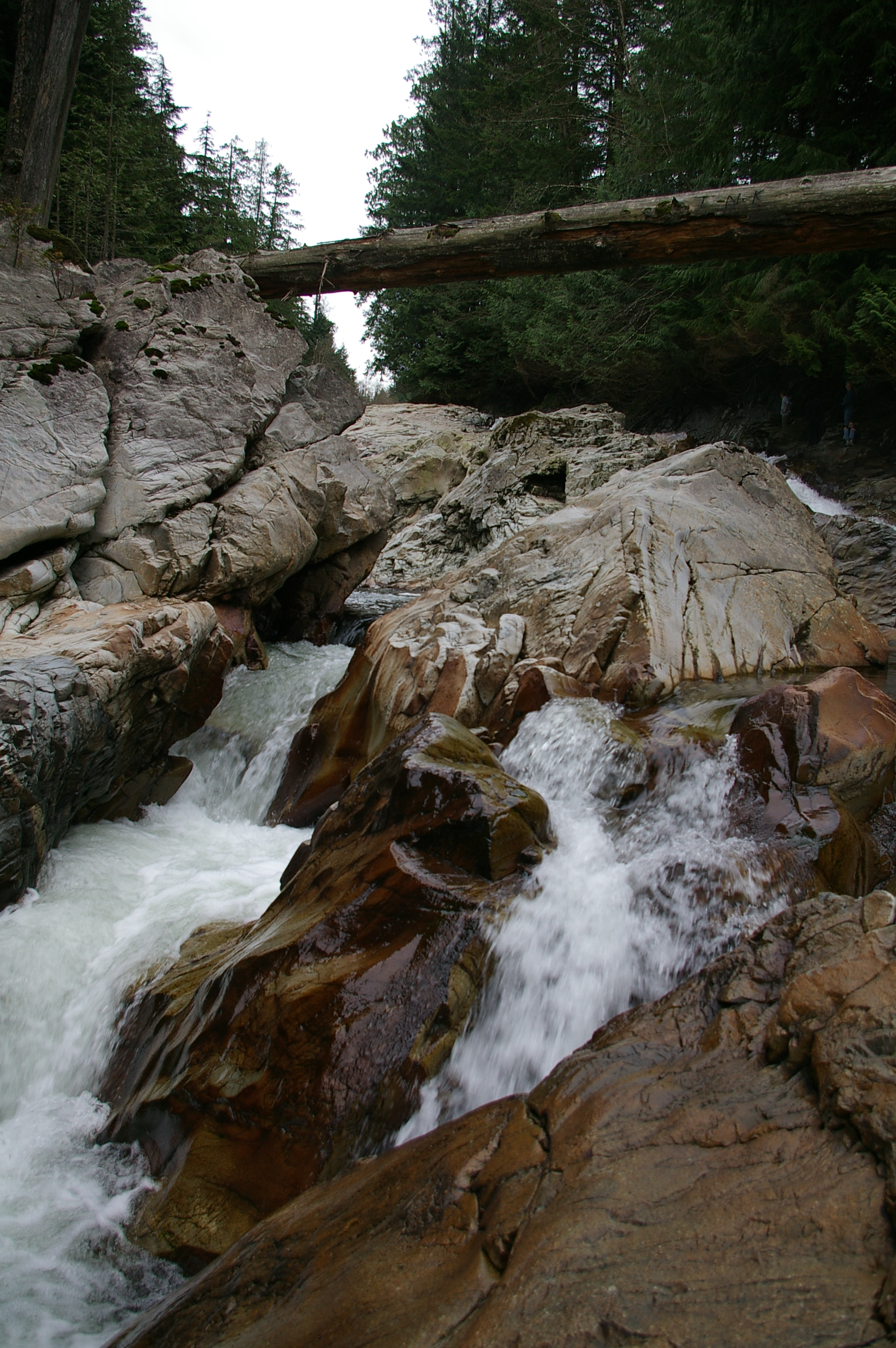
Weeks Falls

== Activities and amenities ==
Park activities include fishing, hiking, mountain biking, bird watching, and rock climbing. Completed in 2017, the Ollalie Trail added 9.2 miles (14.8 km) of backcountry mountain biking.
