= Weeks Falls =

Waterfall in Washington (state), United States

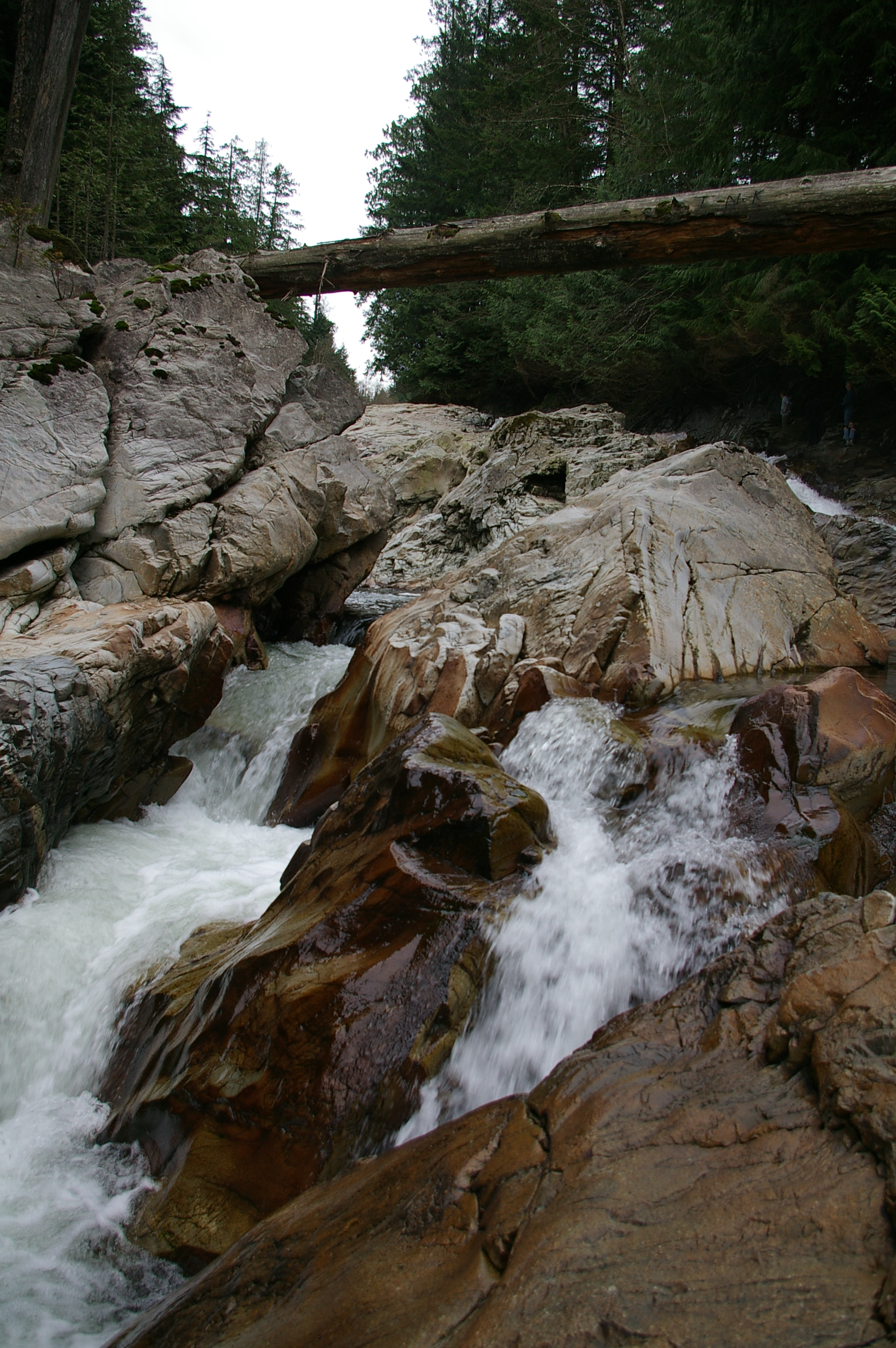
- Weeks Falls from the base
- Interactive map of Weeks Falls
- Location: King County, about 7 miles east of North Bend, Washington
- Coordinates: 47.43301°N 121.64663°W
- Type: Cascade
- Total height: 60 ft (18 m)
- Number of drops: 1
- Average width: 30 ft (9.1 m)
- Watercourse: South Fork of the Snoqualmie River

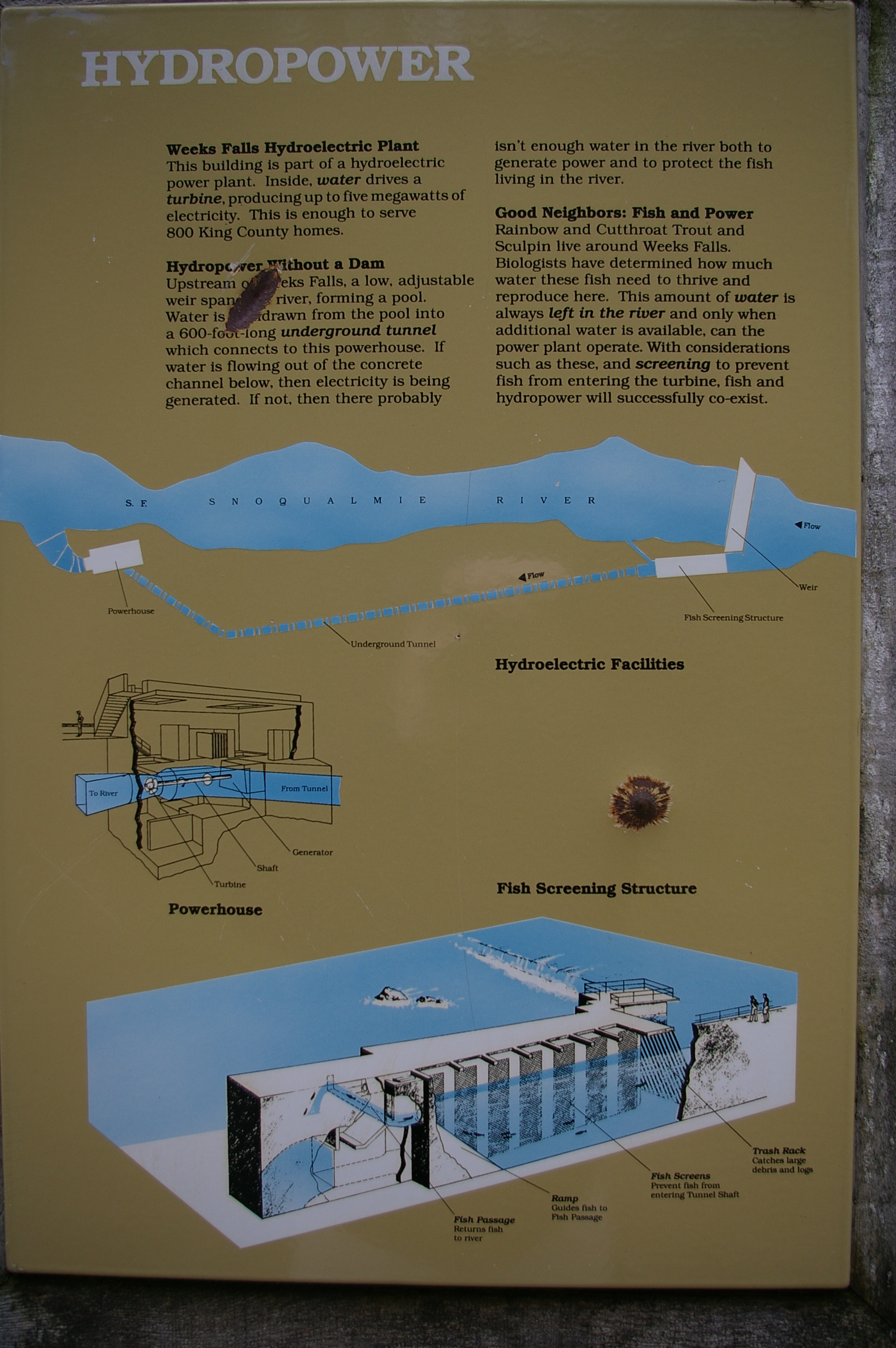
Sign by Weeks Falls Hydro Plant

Weeks Falls is a waterfall on the south fork of the Snoqualmie River, located near North Bend, Washington, USA, just south of Interstate 90 at exit 38. The falls are at the end of the road that goes past the Olallie State Park ranger headquarters. From the gravel parking lot, there is a paved accessible overlook to see the falls and a small area around the hydro-electric plant. There is also a ¼ mile accessible interpretive trail nearby.

Weeks Falls has a small Run-of-the-river hydroelectric plant owned by Eagle Creek Renewable Energy and operated by PIC Group, Inc. Water is drawn from the river above the falls and run through an underground channel to the single 4.3 MW nameplate capacity generating unit. As of year-end 2024, Weeks Falls Generated 13.1 GWh of electricity annually.

== See also ==
- Olallie State Park
- Upper Weeks Falls
- Snoqualmie River
- Damless hydro
