= North Bend Bar and Grill =

Restaurant in North Bend, Washington, U.S.

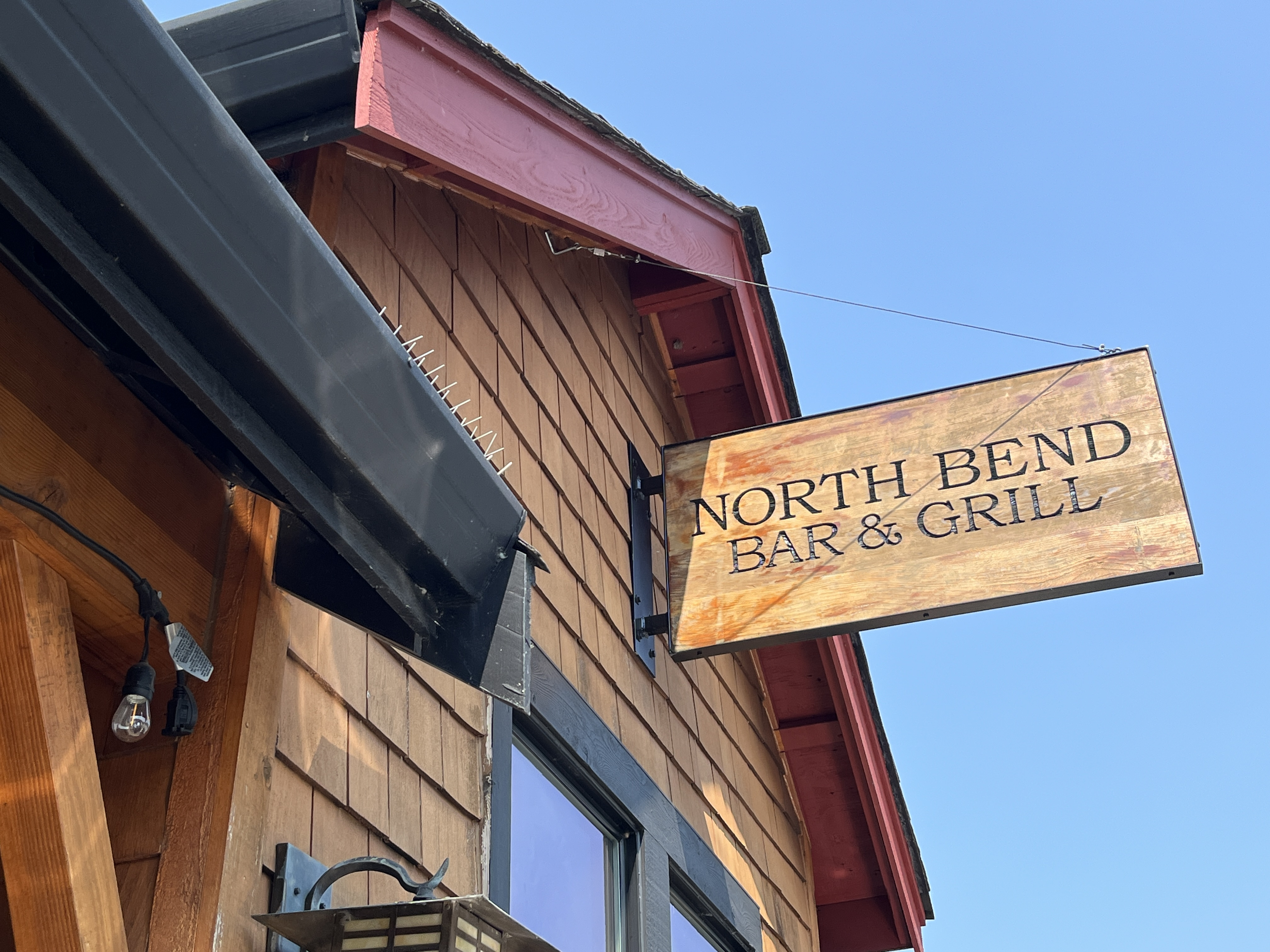
- The restaurant's exterior, 2024
- Interactive map of North Bend Bar and Grill

Restaurant information
- Owner: Keith Mickle
- Location: 145 E North Bend Way, North Bend, King, Washington, 98045, United States
- Coordinates: 47.4943°N 121.7849°W
- Website: northbendbarandgrill.com

North Bend Bar and Grill is a restaurant in North Bend, Washington, United States.

== Description ==
The restaurant North Bend Bar and Grill (NBBG) serves breakfast, lunch, and dinner in North Bend, Washington. It offers views of Mount Si, and the interior has a fireplace, exposed wooden beams, and leather couches. Seattle Metropolitan has described the restaurant as a "more crowded local's joint".

The menu includes steak, prime rib sandwiches, cod fish-and-chips, and sweet potato waffle-style French fries. The most popular dish is pancetta and leek macaroni and cheese, and the restaurant has also served a gluten-free salmon quinoa salad, pastas, seafood, soups, quesadillas, the Mount Si Burger, and the 'Black and Bleu' Caesar salad with chicken strips.

== History ==
NBBG operates in the space that previously housed Little Chalet Cafe, later known as Little Chalet Pancake Shop.

Keith Mickle is the owner. Chef Broc Thomson was replaced by executive chef Tom Rhyneer in 2015. During his approximately six-year tenure as executive chef, Alex Paguaga hosted barbecue nights and luaus in the parking lot.

Keith Sold the restaurant in 2022 to 509 Management, a restaurant group out of Issaquah. Now under the supervision of Ben Howland and Head Chef Andrew Darling.

== Reception ==
In 2008 and 2014, NBBG won in the Best Bar category of the Snoqualmie Valley Record's annual Best of the Valley reader survey. The business was also a finalist in the Best Restaurant and Best Brunch categories in 2014. In 2022, NBBG won in the same survey's Dinner, Lunch, and Favorite Restaurant categories, and was a finalist in the Breakfast and Hamburger categories.
