= Riverbend, Washington =

- Census-designated place
- Location of Riverbend, Washington
- Coordinates: 47°27′58″N 121°45′28″W
- Country: United States
- State: Washington
- County: King

Area
  - Total: 3.01 sq mi (7.80 km^{2})
  - Land: 2.94 sq mi (7.62 km^{2})
  - Water: 0.073 sq mi (0.19 km^{2})
- Elevation: 502 ft (153 m)

Population (2020)
  - Total: 2,123
  - Density: 722/sq mi (279/km^{2})
- Time zone: UTC-8 (Pacific (PST))
  - Summer (DST): UTC-7 (PDT)
- ZIP code: 98045
- Area code: 425
- FIPS code: 53-58742
- GNIS feature ID: 2409184

Riverbend is an unincorporated community and census-designated place (CDP) in King County, Washington, United States. The population was 2,123 at the 2020 census.

Based on per capita income, one of the more reliable measures of affluence, Riverbend ranks 87th of 522 areas in the state of Washington to be ranked.

== Geography ==
Riverbend is located in east-central King County in the valley of the South Fork of the Snoqualmie River. It is bordered to the north, across Interstate 90, by the city of North Bend. Riverbend is served by Exit 32 on I-90, which leads west 31 miles (50 km) to downtown Seattle and east over Snoqualmie Pass 80 miles (130 km) to Ellensburg.

According to the United States Census Bureau, the CDP has a total area of 3.0 square miles (7.8 km^{2}), of which 2.9 square miles (7.6 km^{2}) are land and 0.1 square miles (0.2 km^{2}), or 2.37%, are water.

== Demographics ==
Historical population
| Census | Pop. | Note | %± |
|---|---|---|---|
| 2000 | 2,230 | | — |
| 2010 | 2,132 | | −4.4% |
| 2020 | 2,123 | | −0.4% |
U.S. Decennial Census; 1990 2000 2010

Riverbend first appeared as a census designated place in the 2000 U.S. census.

=== Racial and ethnic composition ===
Riverbend CDP, Washington – Racial and ethnic composition Note: the US Census treats Hispanic/Latino as an ethnic category. This table excludes Latinos from the racial categories and assigns them to a separate category. Hispanics/Latinos may be of any race.
| Race / Ethnicity (NH = Non-Hispanic) | Pop 2000 | Pop 2010 | Pop 2020 | % 2000 | % 2010 | % 2020 |
|---|---|---|---|---|---|---|
| White alone (NH) | 2,080 | 1,927 | 1,782 | 93.27% | 90.38% | 83.94% |
| Black or African American alone (NH) | 6 | 9 | 13 | 0.27% | 0.42% | 0.61% |
| Native American or Alaska Native alone (NH) | 12 | 25 | 23 | 0.54% | 1.17% | 1.08% |
| Asian alone (NH) | 37 | 35 | 42 | 1.66% | 1.64% | 1.98% |
| Native Hawaiian or Pacific Islander alone (NH) | 4 | 9 | 6 | 0.18% | 0.42% | 0.28% |
| Other race alone (NH) | 1 | 1 | 12 | 0.04% | 0.05% | 0.57% |
| Mixed race or Multiracial (NH) | 32 | 50 | 132 | 1.43% | 2.35% | 6.22% |
| Hispanic or Latino (any race) | 58 | 76 | 113 | 2.60% | 3.56% | 5.32% |
| Total | 2,230 | 2,132 | 2,123 | 100.00% | 100.00% | 100.00% |

=== 2000 census ===
At the 2000 census there were 2,230 people, 775 households, and 612 families in the CDP. The population density was 740.2 people per square mile (286.0/km^{2}). There were 791 housing units at an average density of 262.5/sq mi (101.5/km^{2}). The racial makeup of the CDP was 94.48% White, 0.27% African American, 0.54% Native American, 1.75% Asian, 0.18% Pacific Islander, 1.26% from other races, and 1.52% from two or more races. Hispanic or Latino of any race were 2.60%.

Of the 775 households 48.0% had children under the age of 18 living with them, 68.6% were married couples living together, 7.4% had a female householder with no husband present, and 21.0% were non-families. 14.6% of households were one person and 2.2% were one person aged 65 or older. The average household size was 2.88 and the average family size was 3.23.

The age distribution was 31.5% under the age of 18, 5.5% from 18 to 24, 39.8% from 25 to 44, 19.1% from 45 to 64, and 4.1% 65 or older. The median age was 34 years. For every 100 females there were 105.3 males. For every 100 females age 18 and over, there were 102.1 males.

The median household income was $69,716 and the median family income was $72,708. Males had a median income of $56,173 versus $34,516 for females. The per capita income for the CDP was $25,234. About 3.7% of families and 4.0% of the population were below the poverty line, including 8.0% of those under age 18 and none of those age 65 or over.
