= North Bend, Washington =

City in Washington, United States

- City
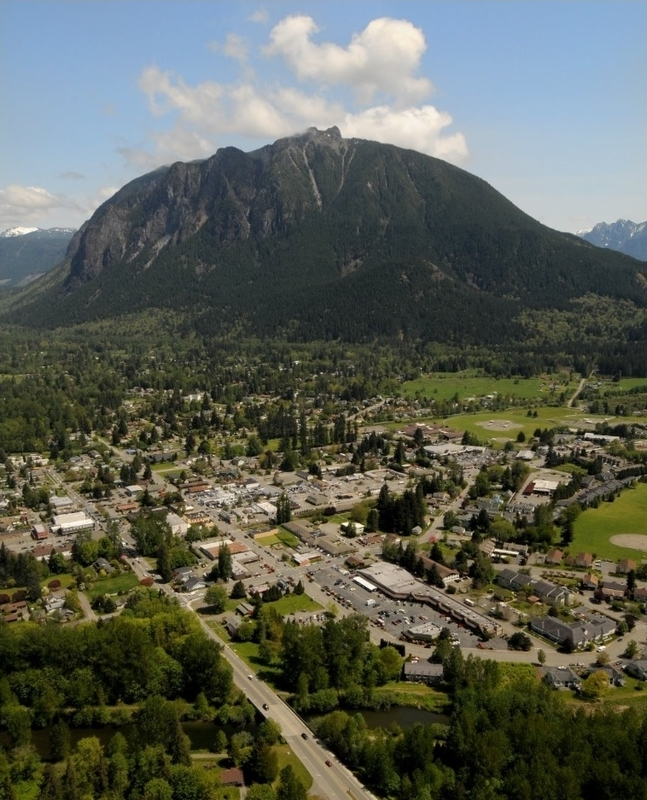
- Aerial view of North Bend with Mount Si

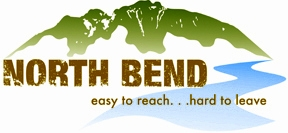
- Flag Logo
- Motto: "Excellence in Government—Pride in Service"
- Location of North Bend, Washington
- Coordinates: 47°29′44″N 121°46′12″W
- Country: United States
- State: Washington
- County: King
- Incorporated: March 12, 1909

Government
  - Type: Mayor–council
  - Mayor: Mary Miller

Area
  - Total: 4.42 sq mi (11.45 km^{2})
  - Land: 4.35 sq mi (11.26 km^{2})
  - Water: 0.066 sq mi (0.17 km^{2})
- Elevation: 456 ft (139 m)

Population (2020)
  - Total: 7,461
  - Estimate (2023): 8,268
  - Density: 1,901.5/sq mi (734.19/km^{2})
- Time zone: UTC–8 (Pacific (PST))
  - Summer (DST): UTC–7 (PDT)
- ZIP Code: 98045
- Area code: 425
- FIPS code: 53-49485
- GNIS feature ID: 2411270
- Website: northbendwa.gov

North Bend is a city in King County, Washington, United States, on the outskirts of the Seattle metropolitan area. The population was 7,461 at the 2020 census. The city is 30 miles (48 km) east of Seattle on Interstate 90 and lies in the foothills of the Cascade Range near Snoqualmie Pass.

Since the closure of Weyerhaeuser's Snoqualmie sawmill, North Bend has become a prosperous bedroom community for Seattle and Bellevue. The city was made famous by David Lynch's television series Twin Peaks, which was partially filmed in North Bend. The community is also home to Nintendo North Bend, the main North American production facility and distribution center for the video game console manufacturer Nintendo.

== History ==
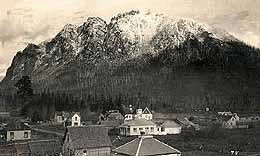
Downtown North Bend with Mount Si in 1900

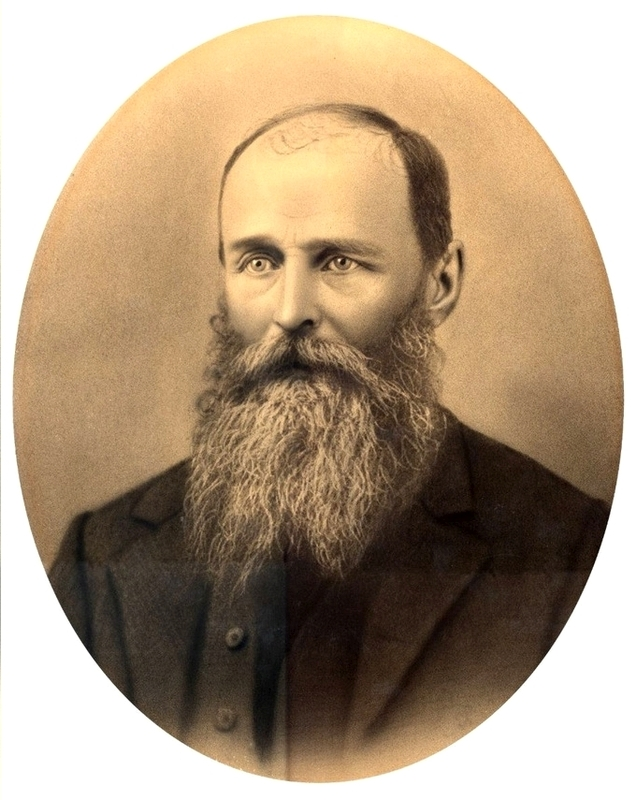
Jeremiah Borst (1830–1890), father of the Snoqualmie Valley community

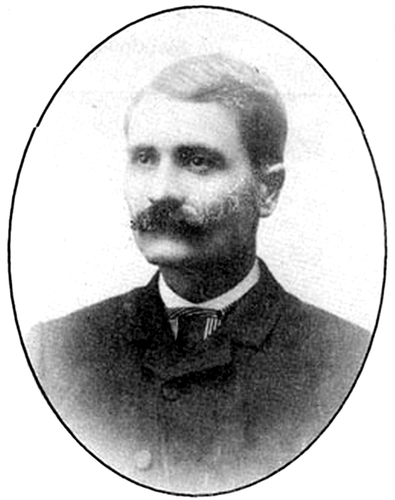
William Taylor (1853–1941), founder of North Bend

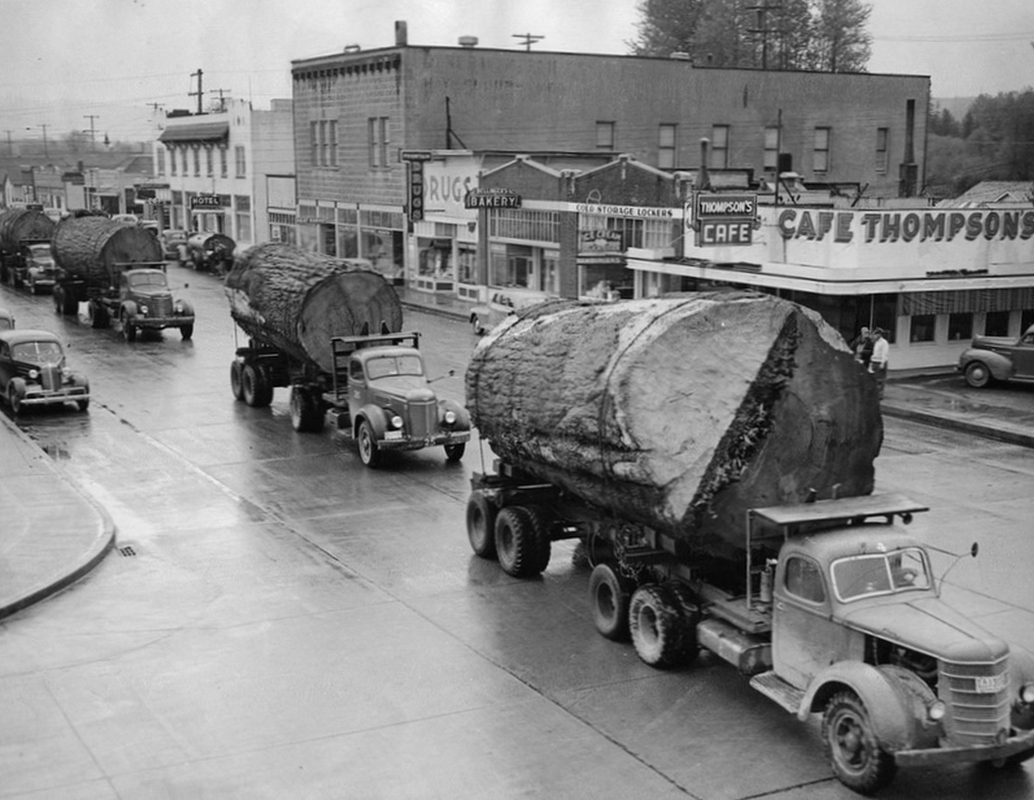
Downtown North Bend in 1943

The Snoqualmie Indian Tribe has resided in the Snoqualmie Prairie, including the area now known as North Bend, for thousands of years. This prairie southeast of Snoqualmie Falls was the ancestral home, hunting and forage grounds for the Snoqualmie people and was located in the upper Snoqualmie Valley near the Snoqualmie River fork confluence, Mount Si, and the western foothills of the Cascade Range.

One of the first American explorers to the upper Snoqualmie Valley was Samuel Hancock, who arrived in 1851. Hancock traveled upriver with his Snoqualmie guides, fording canoes around the falls to reach Snoqualmie Prairie, searching for coal deposits. He was taken to a "very extensive and fertile prairie" about two miles above Snoqualmie Falls. The beautiful open grassland came to be known as the Snoqualmie Prairie, the heart of which is now known as Tollgate and Meadowbrook farms. The Snoqualmies, led by Chief Patkanim, later sided with early settlers in the 1850s Indian Wars and were one of the signatory tribes of the Treaty of Point Elliott in 1855, which failed to designate an Indian reservation for the Snoqualmies. Some of the soldiers in those wars, such as the Kellogg brothers, established cabins near abandoned U.S. Army blockhouses; however, the most well known American resident in the valley was Jeremiah Borst, who arrived in 1858.

After the Homestead Act of 1862, more settlers ventured to the Snoqualmie Valley, with the first families settling near Borst on the easterly end of Snoqualmie Prairie. In 1865, Matts Peterson homesteaded the site that ultimately became North Bend. In 1879, Peterson sold the property to Borst and moved east of the Cascades. Borst wrote to Will Taylor, who had left the Pacific Northwest to pursue mining in California, and offered him the Peterson homestead in exchange for labor. Taylor returned and became the driving force in developing the city while expanding his property to include a thriving trading post and boarding house for travelers over Snoqualmie Pass. On February 16, 1889, with the upcoming railroad boom, Taylor formally platted a city including his farm, upcoming street plans and building lots, giving it the name "Snoqualmie". Later that summer, competing Seattle land speculators subsequently platted nearby "Snoqualmie Falls", choosing a similar name. Pressured by demands of the Seattle, Lake Shore and Eastern Railway to avoid confusion, Taylor reluctantly renamed his city "Mountain View". However, the U.S. Post Office Department objected to "Mountain View", as a city with that name already existed in northern Whatcom County. To conclude the matter Taylor agreed to permanently rename the community "North Bend", after its prime location near the large northward bend of the South and Middle Fork of the Snoqualmie River. Taylor was proud of his new, thriving city, but by historical accounts, "He never got over having his city name taken away." North Bend was officially incorporated on March 12, 1909, and grew throughout the 20th century, with an early economic focus on logging, sawmill production, agricultural and dairy farming.

The city government issued a moratorium on new construction in April 1999 after it exceeded the limits on its existing water rights to pump groundwater. It was lifted in 2009 after North Bend secured an agreement with Seattle Public Utilities to provide water and construction of a new pipeline from the Cedar River watershed. North Bend, which had transitioned into a bedroom community by the late 20th century, began attracting recreation and outdoors businesses in the 2010s. The city also developed tourist activities centered around the 1990s television series Twin Peaks, which was partially filmed in North Bend, Snoqualmie, and Fall City.

== Geography ==
North Bend is located in the foothills of the Cascade Range, 30 miles (48 km) east of Seattle in the upper valley of the Snoqualmie River. The city is bordered to the northwest by the city of Snoqualmie. Both communities lie near the center of the Mountains to Sound Greenway. North Bend is located near the geographic center of King County.

Mount Si, the most prominent geological feature nearby, looms over the town. To the south is Rattlesnake Ridge. Mount Si stands at 4,167 feet (1,270 m) and towers above the town, itself at around 440 ft (130 m). A 4-mile (6 km) trail zigzags up to the summit with a vertical climb of 3,500 feet (1,100 m). According to the United States Census Bureau, the city has a total area of 4.42 square miles (11.45 km^{2}), of which 4.35 square miles (11.27 km^{2}) are land and 0.07 square miles (0.18 km^{2}) are water.

North Bend annexed some neighborhoods near the Tanner and Stilson areas on July 6, 2009.

=== Climate ===
North Bend's climate (border between Cfb and Csb in the Köppen climate classification) is warm and generally dry during the summer when high temperatures tend to be in the 70s and mild to cold during the winter when high temperatures tend to be in the 30s and 40s. The town's location in the foothills means that it receives significantly higher annual precipitation than other suburbs to the west, and also translates into heavier snowfall in the winter. The all-time record high temperature is 115 °F (46 °C) set during the 2021 Western North America heat wave. The warmest month of the year is August with an average maximum temperature of 77 °F (25 °C), while the coldest month of the year is January with an average minimum temperature of 29 °F (−2 °C). The annual average precipitation in North Bend is 59.1 inches (1,500 mm) with 14.7 inches (370 mm) of snowfall. Winter months tend to be wetter than summer months.

Climate data for North Bend, Washington
Month	Jan	Feb	Mar	Apr	May	Jun	Jul	Aug	Sep	Oct	Nov	Dec	Year
Record high °F (°C)	67 (19)	75 (24)	79 (26)	90 (32)	97 (36)	115 (46)	105 (41)	102 (39)	98 (37)	95 (35)	75 (24)	67 (19)	115 (46)
Mean daily maximum °F (°C)	44 (7)	47 (8)	52 (11)	57 (14)	64 (18)	69 (21)	76 (24)	77 (25)	71 (22)	59 (15)	49 (9)	43 (6)	59 (15)
Mean daily minimum °F (°C)	33 (1)	33 (1)	35 (2)	39 (4)	44 (7)	49 (9)	51 (11)	52 (11)	48 (9)	42 (6)	37 (3)	33 (1)	41 (5)
Record low °F (°C)	−11 (−24)	−9 (−23)	8 (−13)	24 (−4)	26 (−3)	31 (−1)	36 (2)	35 (2)	30 (−1)	23 (−5)	2 (−17)	−2 (−19)	−11 (−24)
Average precipitation inches (mm)	10.25 (260)	6.88 (175)	8.58 (218)	6.31 (160)	3.89 (99)	3.44 (87)	1.31 (33)	1.49 (38)	3.17 (81)	7.16 (182)	11.39 (289)	9.31 (236)	73.18 (1,858)
Average snowfall inches (cm)	4.0 (10)	4.8 (12)	1.3 (3.3)	0 (0)	0 (0)	0 (0)	0 (0)	0 (0)	0 (0)	0 (0)	1.6 (4.1)	3.8 (9.7)	15.5 (39.1)
Source: http://www.wrcc.dri.edu/cgi-bin/cliMAIN.pl?wa7773

== Demographics ==
Historical population
Census	Pop.	Note	%±
1910	299		—
1920	387		29.4%
1930	548		41.6%
1940	646		17.9%
1950	787		21.8%
1960	945		20.1%
1970	1,625		72.0%
1980	1,701		4.7%
1990	2,578		51.6%
2000	4,746		84.1%
2010	5,731		20.8%
2020	7,461		30.2%
2023 (est.)	8,268		10.8%
U.S. Decennial Census; 2020 Census

As of the 2022 American Community Survey, there are 2,797 estimated households in North Bend with an average of 2.67 persons per household. The city has a median household income of $171,078. Approximately 6.1% of the city's population lives at or below the poverty line. North Bend has an estimated 71.0% employment rate, with 56.0% of the population holding a bachelor's degree or higher and 95.8% holding a high school diploma.

=== Racial and ethnic composition ===
North Bend, Washington – racial and ethnic composition Note: the US Census treats Hispanic/Latino as an ethnic category. This table excludes Latinos from the racial categories and assigns them to a separate category. Hispanics/Latinos may be of any race.
Race / ethnicity (NH = non-Hispanic)	Pop. 2000	Pop. 2010	Pop. 2020	% 2000	% 2010	% 2020
White alone (NH)	4,271	5,028	5,905	89.99%	87.73%	79.14%
Black or African American alone (NH)	32	24	51	0.67%	0.42%	0.68%
Native American or Alaska Native alone (NH)	49	51	52	1.03%	0.89%	0.70%
Asian alone (NH)	106	88	303	2.23%	1.54%	4.06%
Pacific Islander alone (NH)	7	7	14	0.15%	0.12%	0.19%
Other race alone (NH)	3	6	23	0.06%	0.10%	0.31%
Mixed race or multiracial (NH)	98	160	501	2.06%	2.79%	6.71%
Hispanic or Latino (any race)	180	367	612	3.79%	6.40%	8.20%
Total	4,746	5,731	7,461	100.00%	100.00%	100.00%

=== 2020 census ===
As of the 2020 census, North Bend had a population of 7,461 people, 2,775 households, and 2,031 families residing in the city.

The population density was 1,716.0 inhabitants per square mile (662.6/km^{2}). There were 2,951 housing units, of which 6.0% were vacant; the homeowner vacancy rate was 0.5% and the rental vacancy rate was 7.8%.

The median age was 39.3 years. 25.1% of residents were under the age of 18 and 12.9% of residents were 65 years of age or older. For every 100 females there were 98.0 males, and for every 100 females age 18 and over there were 95.0 males.

Approximately 98.9% of residents lived in urban areas, while 1.1% lived in rural areas.

Of the households, 38.8% had children under the age of 18 living in them, 60.5% were married-couple households, 13.6% were households with a male householder and no spouse or partner present, and 18.8% were households with a female householder and no spouse or partner present. About 19.0% of all households were made up of individuals and 8.2% had someone living alone who was 65 years of age or older.

Racial composition as of the 2020 census
Race	Number	Percent
White	6,056	81.2%
Black or African American	58	0.8%
American Indian and Alaska Native	61	0.8%
Asian	305	4.1%
Native Hawaiian and Other Pacific Islander	14	0.2%
Some other race	216	2.9%
Two or more races	751	10.1%
Hispanic or Latino (of any race)	612	8.2%

=== 2010 census ===
As of the 2010 census, there were 5,731 people, 2,210 households, and 1,487 families residing in the city. The population density was 1,343.2 inhabitants per square mile (518.6/km^{2}). There were 2,348 housing units at an average density of 549.9 inhabitants per square mile (212.3/km^{2}). The racial makeup of the city was 90.7% White, 0.5% African American, 0.9% Native American, 1.6% Asian, 0.1% Pacific Islander, 2.5% from other races, and 3.6% from two or more races. Hispanic or Latino people of any race were 6.4% of the population.

There were 2,210 households, of which 39.0% had children under the age of 18 living with them, 52.9% were married couples living together, 10.0% had a female householder with no husband present, 4.4% had a male householder with no wife present, and 32.7% were non-families. 24.8% of all households were made up of individuals, and 9% had someone living alone who was 65 years of age or older. The average household size was 2.57 and the average family size was 3.10.

The median age in the city was 38.7 years. 26.8% of residents were under the age of 18; 6.8% were between the ages of 18 and 24; 27.6% were from 25 to 44; 29.4% were from 45 to 64; and 9.4% were 65 years of age or older. The gender makeup of the city was 49.3% male and 50.7% female.

=== 2000 census ===
As of the 2000 census, there were 4,746 people, 1,841 households, and 1,286 families residing in the city. The population density was 1,611.6 inhabitants per square mile (622.2/km^{2}). There were 1,889 housing units at an average density of 641.4 inhabitants per square mile (247.6/km^{2}). The racial makeup of the city was 92.01% White, 0.70% African American, 1.03% Native American, 2.23% Asian, 0.17% Pacific Islander, 1.45% from other races, and 2.40% from two or more races. Hispanic or Latino people of any race were 3.79% of the population.

There were 1,841 households, out of which 37.8% had children under the age of 18 living with them, 57.1% were married couples living together, 8.8% had a female householder with no husband present, and 30.1% were non-families. 23.7% of all households were made up of individuals, and 10.8% had someone living alone who was 65 years of age or older. The average household size was 2.53 and the average family size was 3.01.

In the city the population was 27.3% under the age of 18, 6.7% from 18 to 24, 37.1% from 25 to 44, 18.4% from 45 to 64, and 10.6% who were 65 years of age or older. The median age was 34 years. For every 100 females, there were 97.5 males. For every 100 females age 18 and over, there were 94.0 males.

The median income for a household in the city was $61,534, and the median income for a family was $69,402. Males had a median income of $57,333 versus $38,401 for females. The per capita income for the city was $28,229. About 2.1% of families and 4.7% of the population were below the poverty line, including 5.1% of those under age 18 and 3.0% of those age 65 or over.

== Culture ==
=== Historic McGrath Hotel ===
The McGrath Hotel is located on the site of the cabin of William Henry Taylor, who platted North Bend in 1889. In October 1921, Jack McGrath and his wife Caroline purchased the site of their future venture, McGrath's Café; construction was completed as a one-story restaurant in 1922. In early 1926 the building was expanded two window bays westward, creating the hotel lobby (now the restaurant bar), and a second story was added to the entire structure to accommodate the hotel rooms of the new McGrath Hotel. After several years of deferred maintenance, the McGrath was purchased in 2000 by a local couple who spent two years rehabilitating the building. It is now listed on the National Register of Historic Places. The first floor currently houses a popular restaurant, the Iron Duck Public House.

=== Historic North Bend Theatre ===
On April 9, 1941, the North Bend Theatre opened its doors. Built at a cost of $12,000 with 400 seats, the 4,000 square foot theater's occupancy is now 265 and it has continued operating as an independent movie theater since its opening day through seven family ownerships. In 1999, the theatre underwent a major renovation. In 2013, the theater was once more saved from extinction by a successful $100,000+ fundraiser to convert the projection system from 35mm cellulose to 4K digital video. During this series of renovations every part of the building was improved without sacrificing the distinctive character of this 1941 Art Deco theater. The renovation was awarded a Spellman Award, a King County honor, for the efforts.

The movie house hosted the opening premier of the David Lynch movie, Twin Peaks: Fire Walk With Me.

=== Valley Center Stage Community Theater ===
Valley Center Stage is a downtown community theater that promotes the performing arts in all its aspects. The theater has regular shows featuring classics and comedy. In addition, the theater offers opportunities to valley residents to participate in the theater's productions.

=== Snoqualmie Valley Historical Museum ===
The Snoqualmie Valley Historical Museum, operated by the Snoqualmie Valley Historical Society, has been sharing the history of the Snoqualmie Valley for over 50 years.

=== North Bend Visitor Center & Mountain View Art Gallery ===
The Visitors Information Center was operated by the North Bend Downtown Foundation. The Mountain View Gallery featured local artwork and hosts special events for the community throughout the year. The combined facility opened in 2014. The modern Northwest Regional style center featured touchscreen computers for visitors to access a variety of information on local attractions and history.

The Visitor Information Center and Mountain View Art Gallery closed in 2019.

== Transportation ==
North Bend is located 30 miles (48 km) east of Seattle on Interstate 90, which continues over Snoqualmie Pass to Spokane. The city also has all-day bus service to Issaquah and Mercer Island station provided by King County Metro. The agency also operates Trailhead Direct, a seasonal weekend shuttle service that connects Seattle and Bellevue to hiking areas near North Bend. An express bus with service to Downtown Seattle was eliminated in September 2014. Metro also manages a number of vanpools from North Bend. Snoqualmie Valley Transportation operates a community shuttle bus route between North Bend and Monroe with funding from Metro, the Washington State Department of Transportation, and the Snoqualmie Tribe.

North Bend has a city trail system that also connects with the regional network. The Snoqualmie Valley Regional Trail stretches from Duvall through Carnation, Fall City, Snoqualmie, and North Bend to Rattlesnake Lake. This 31.5-mile (50.7 km) trail connects to the Palouse to Cascades State Park Trail (which goes clear across Washington to the Idaho border) and to the city of Snoqualmie's extensive trail network. North Bend also has its own city trail system in downtown, the Si View neighborhood and along the South Fork of the Snoqualmie River in several places.

== Parks and recreation ==
Outdoor recreation opportunities include hiking, fishing, mountain biking, climbing, river sports, wildlife observation, and enjoying scenic areas, all within town limits, not to mention the vast recreational playground immediately surrounding the town. Current city parks include Dahlgren Family Park, E.J. Roberts Park, Future Tennant Trailhead Park, Gardiner-Weeks Memorial Park, Meadowbrook Farm, Riverfront Park, Si View Neighborhood Park, Si View Park and Community Center, Snoqualmie Valley Trail, Tanner Trail, Tannerwood Neighborhood Park, Tollgate Farm, Tollgate Farm Park, Torguson Park and William Henry Taylor Park.

== Gallery ==
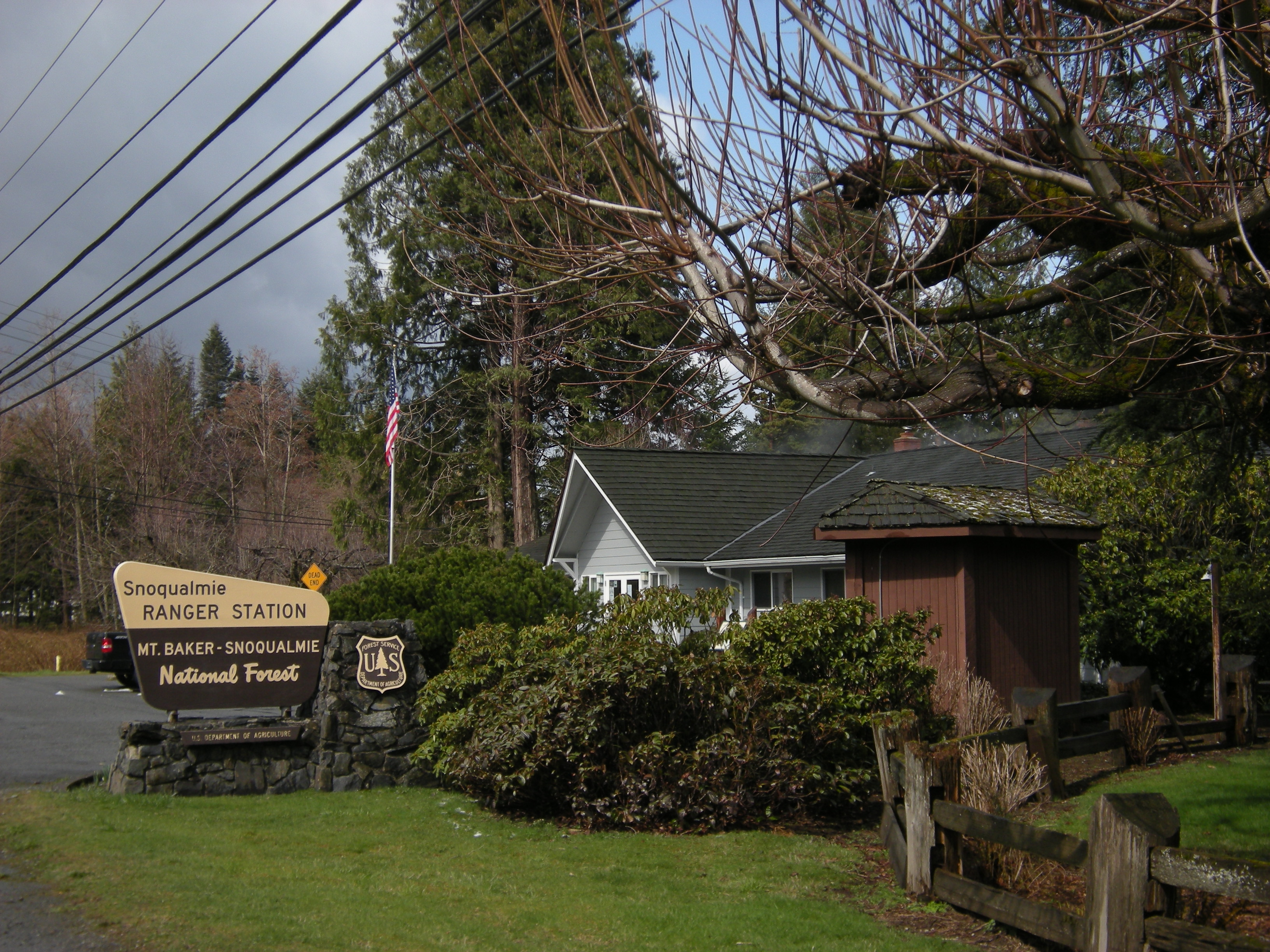
North Bend Ranger Station, 1936

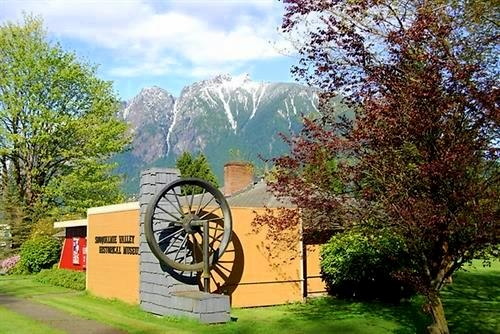
Snoqualmie Valley Historical Museum - Downtown North Bend

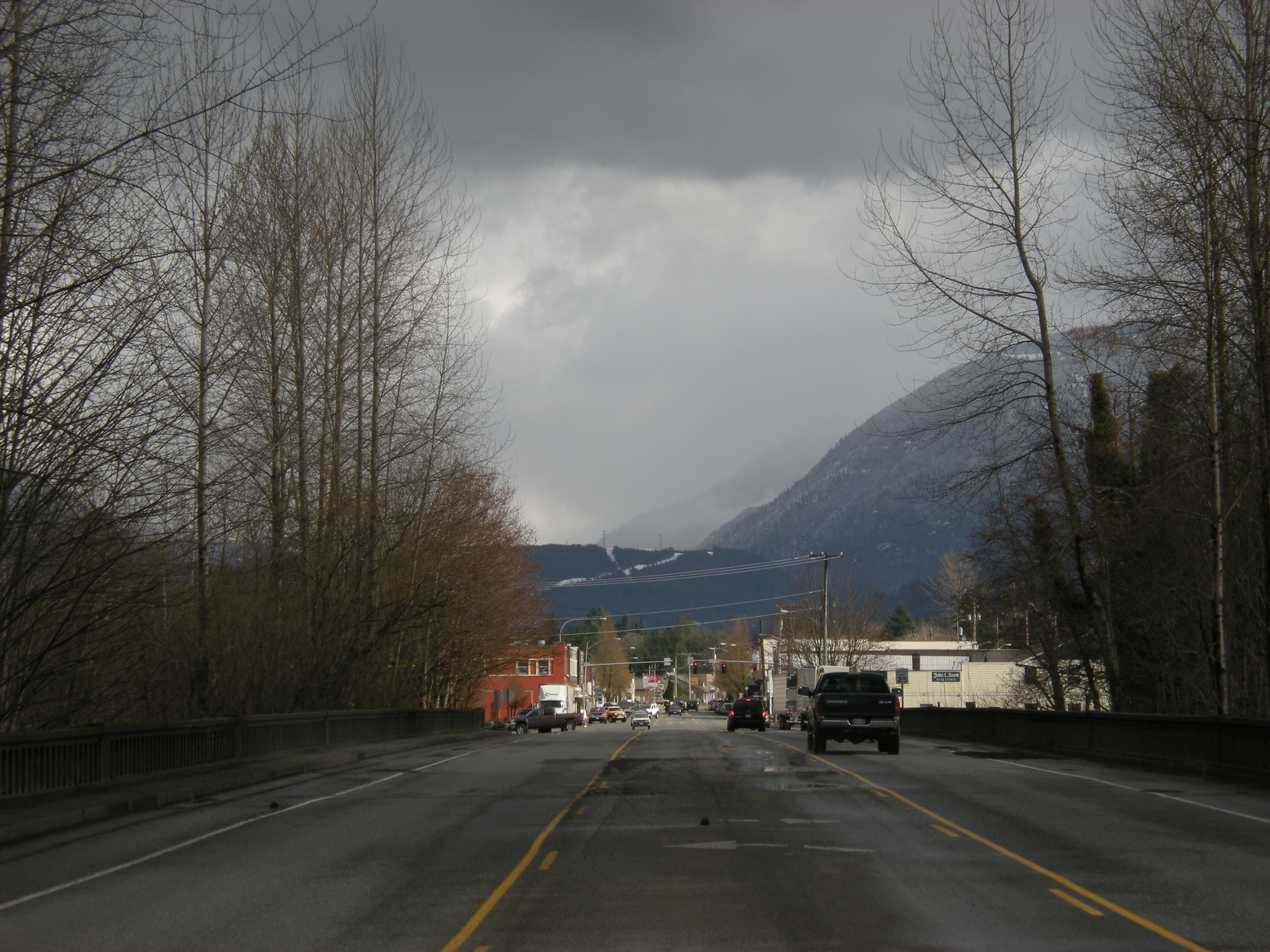
Downtown North Bend as seen from the North Bend Way Bridge

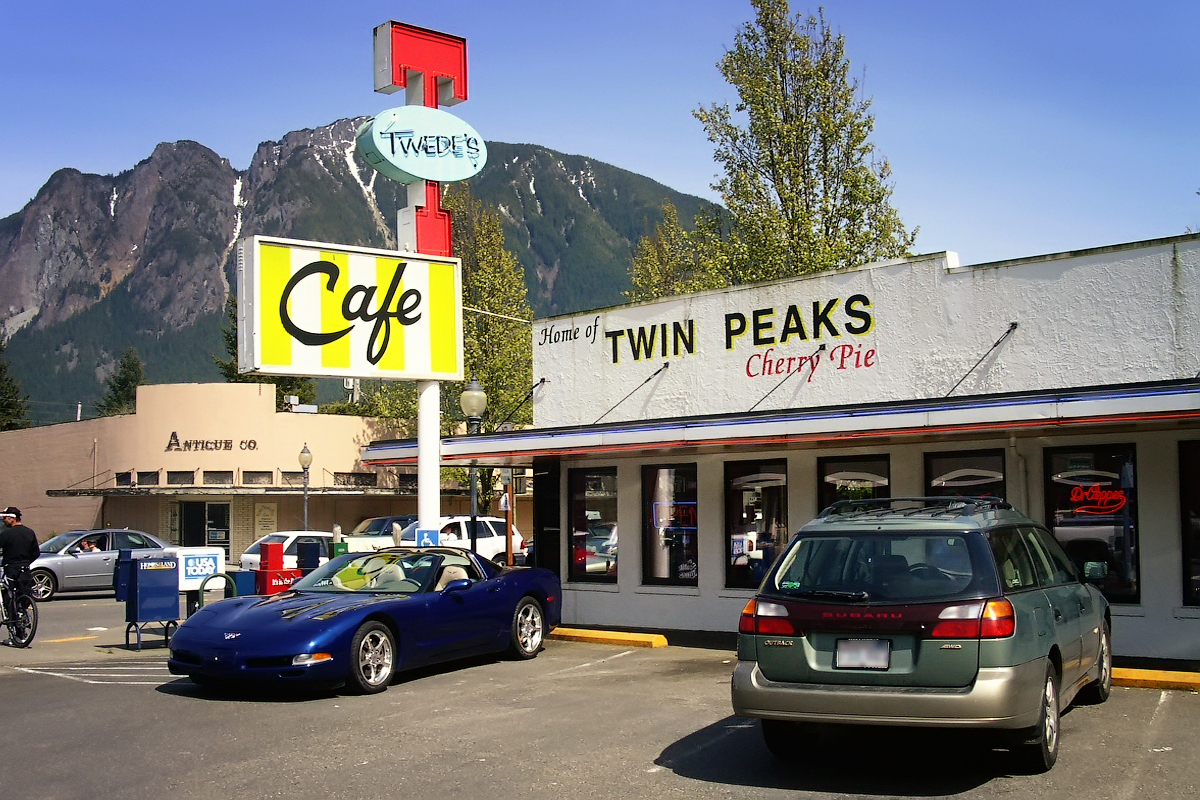
Twede's Café (Mar-T Café) - founded 1941 "Twin Peaks: Double R Diner"

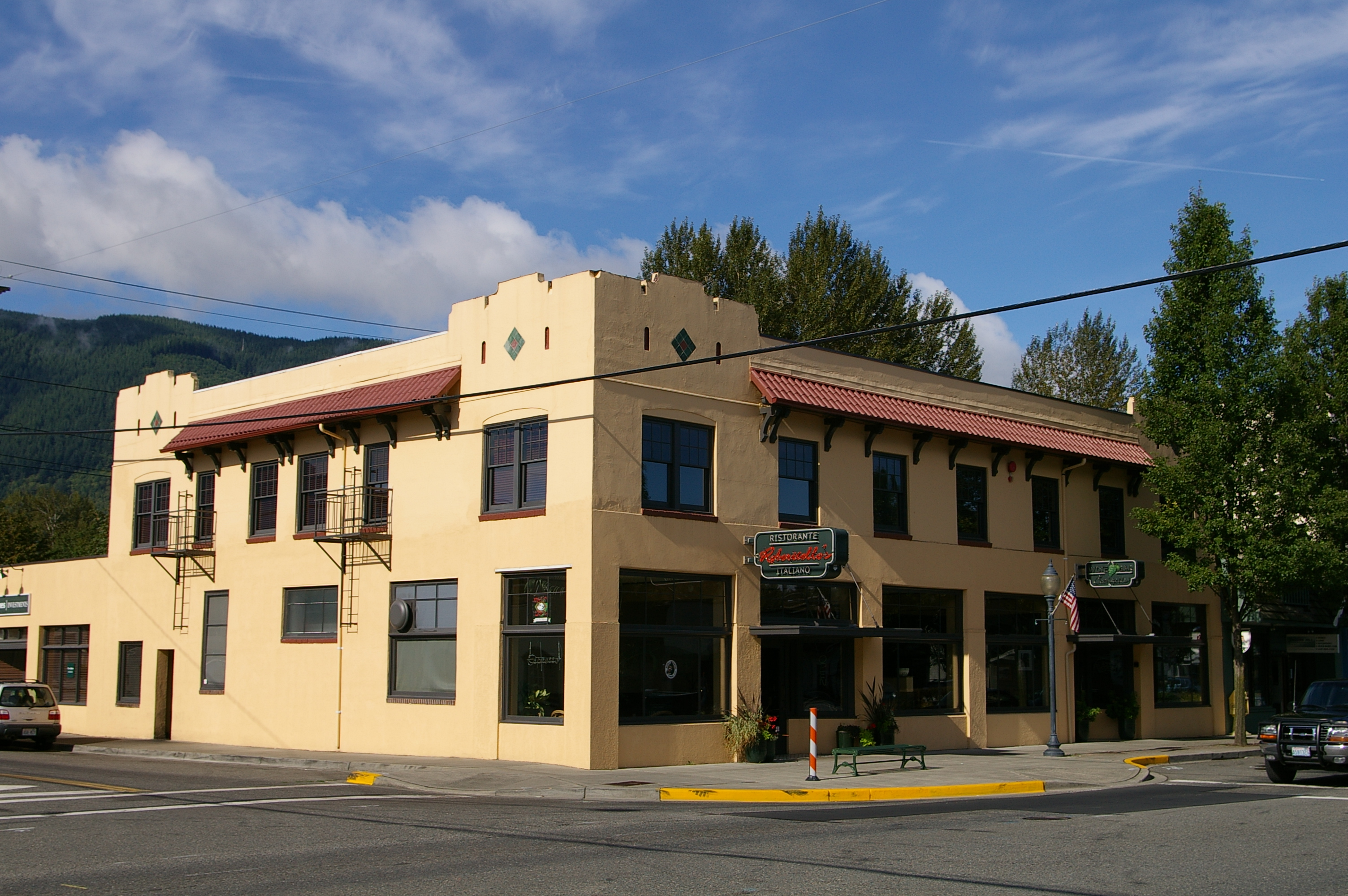
Historic McGrath Hotel - founded 1922, currently the Iron Duck Public House

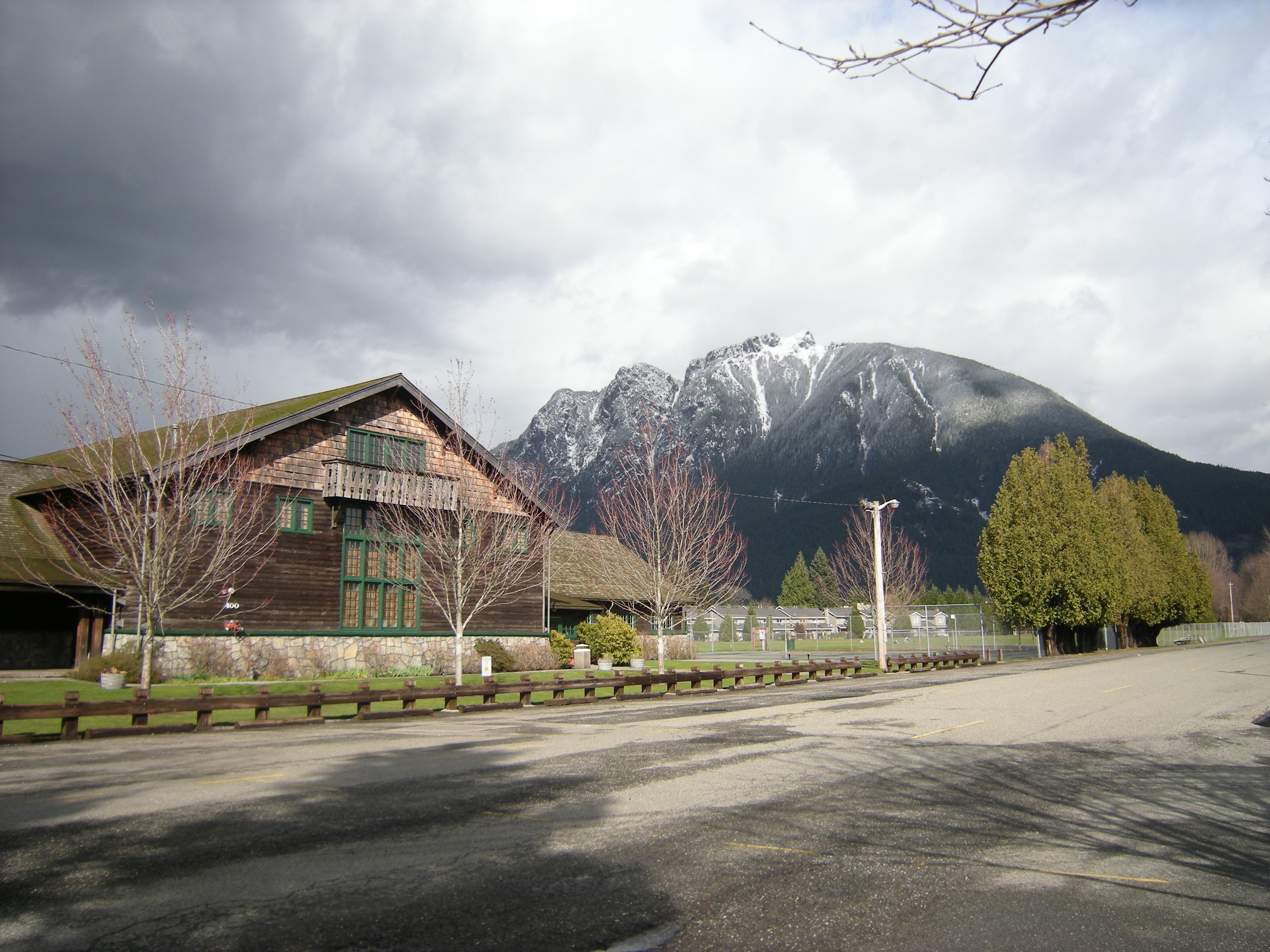
Historic Si View Community Center & Park - founded 1938

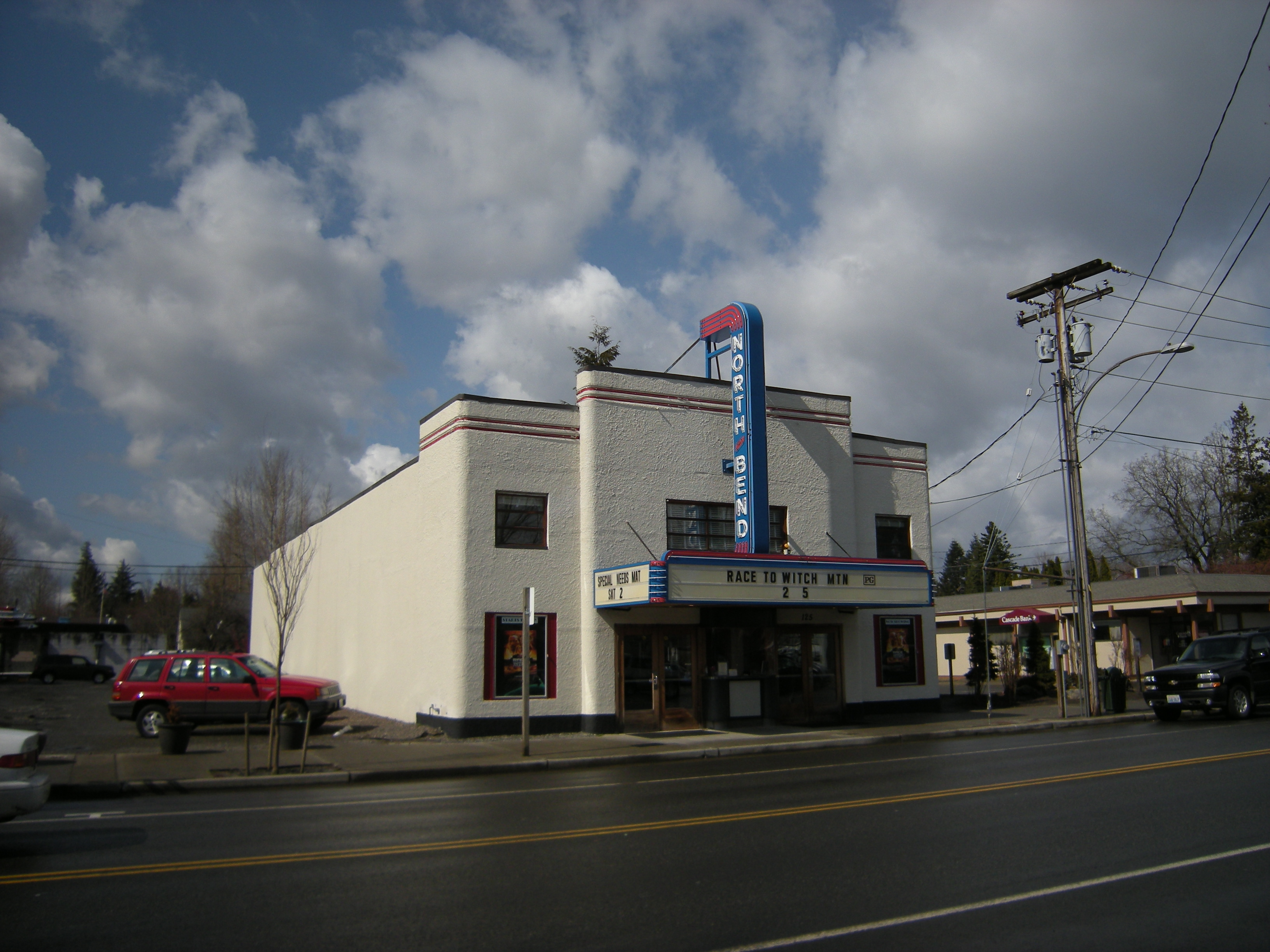
Historic North Bend Theatre - founded 1941, Art Deco style- fully restored and updated

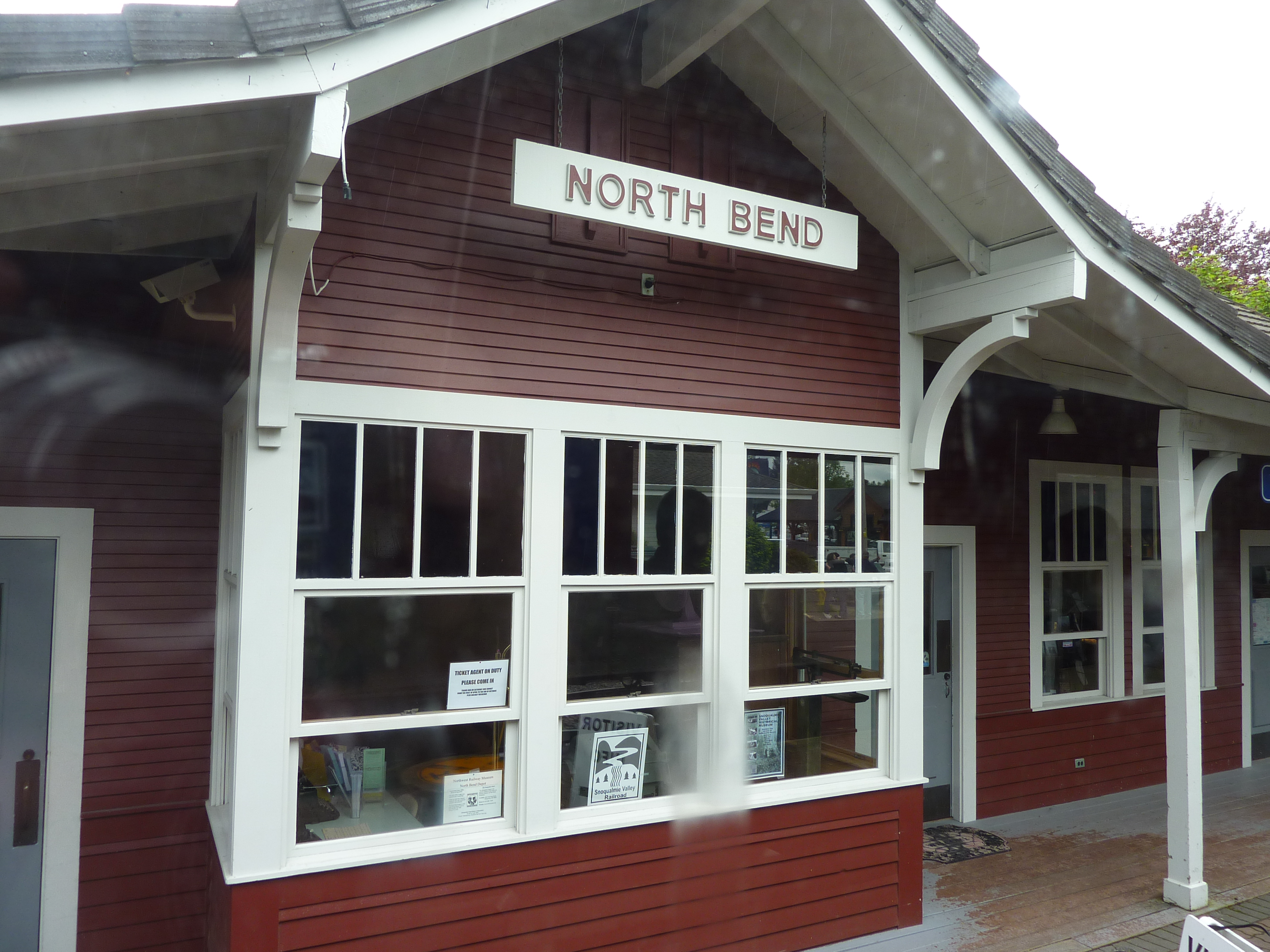
Northwest Railway Museum - North Bend Railroad Depot

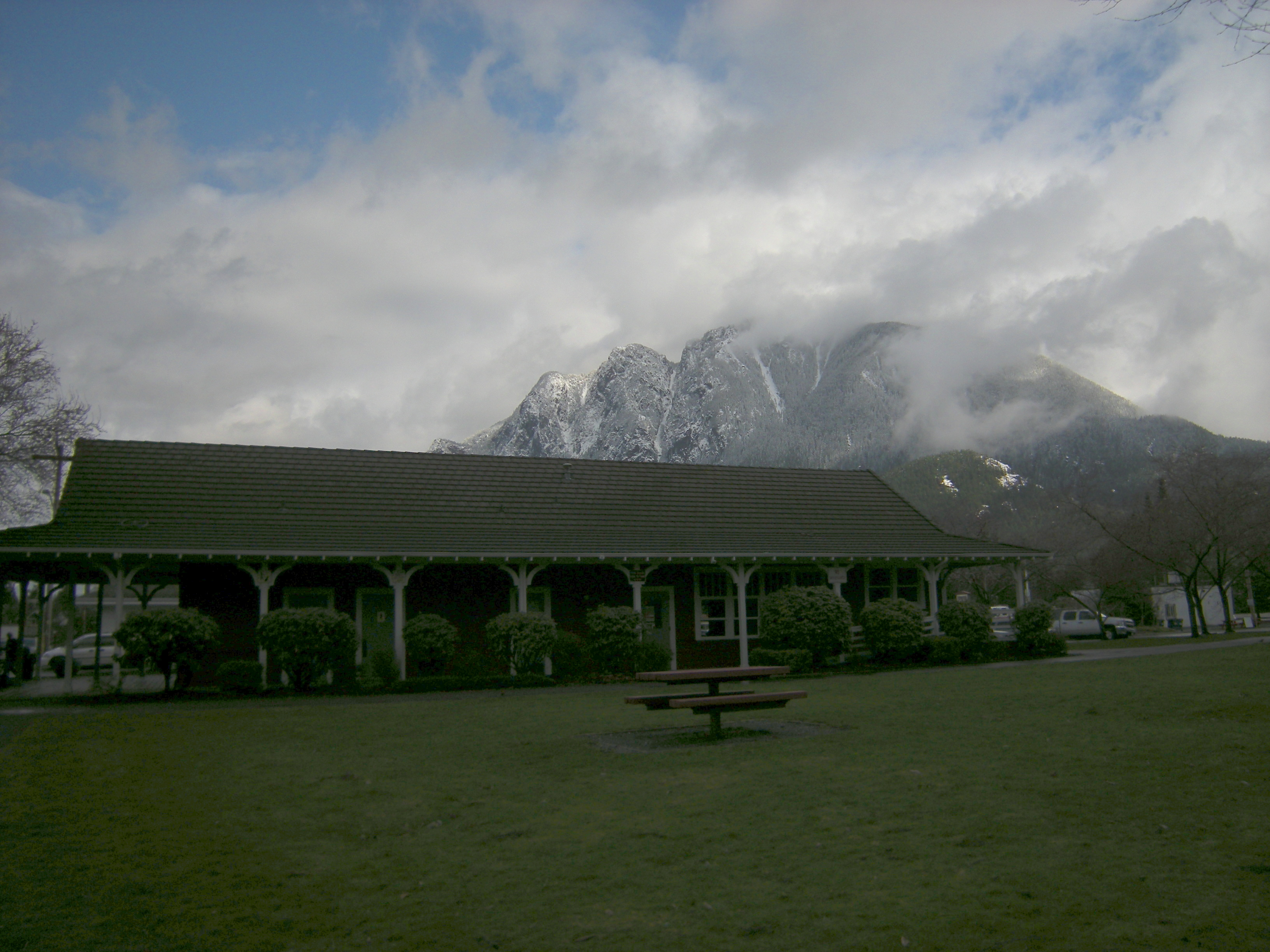
William Henry Taylor Railroad Park & Community Open Space

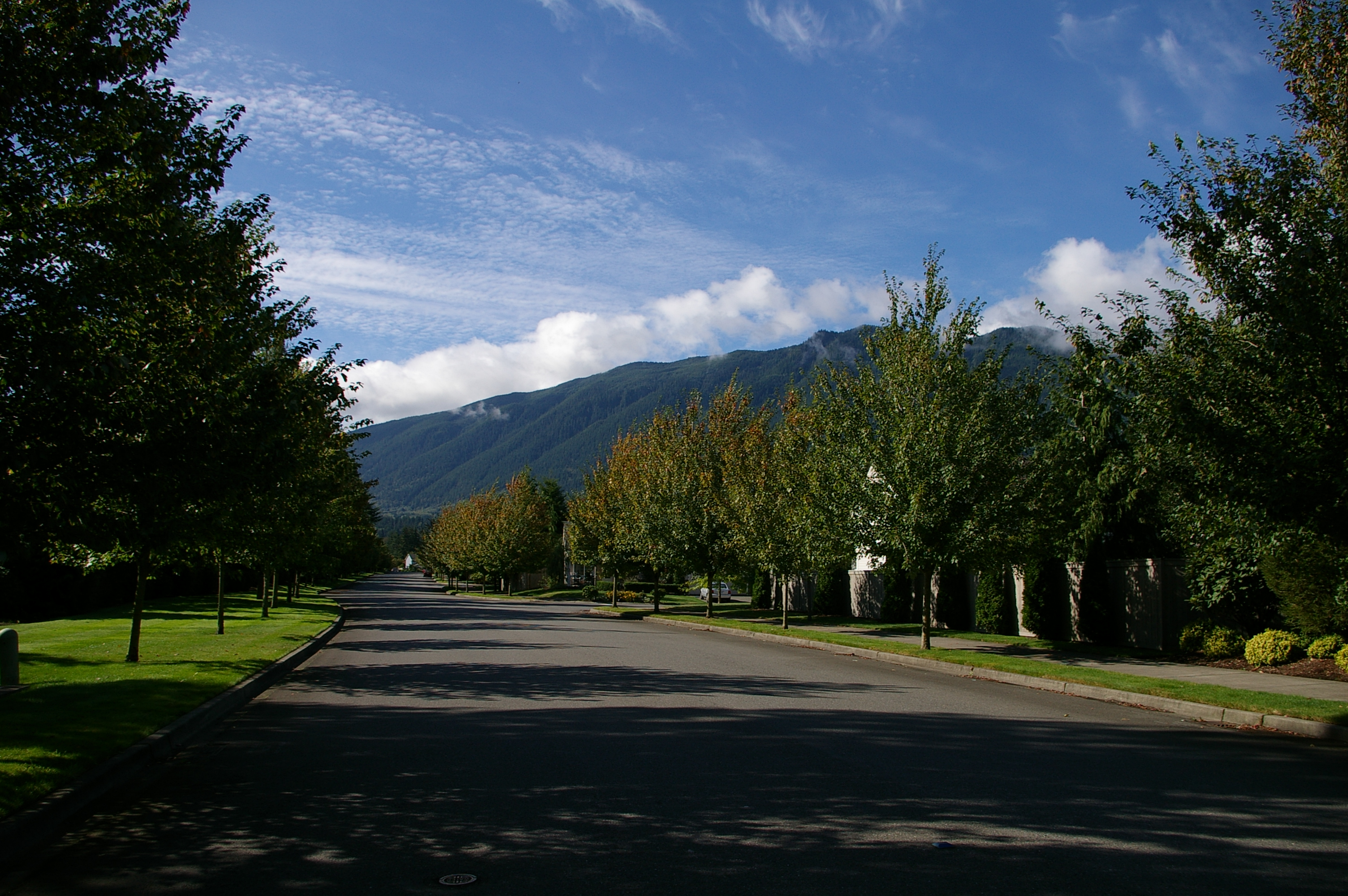
Si View neighborhood, Rattlesnake Ridge in background

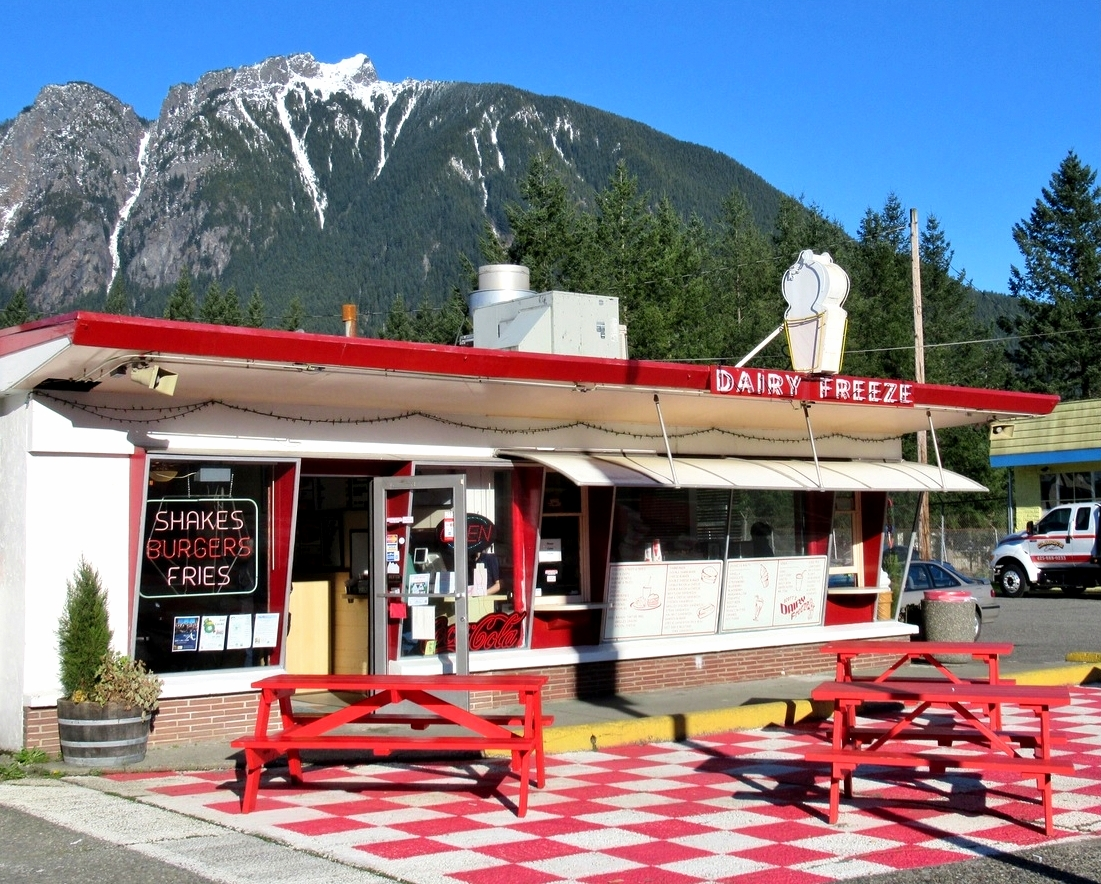
Historic Scott's Dairy Freeze - oldest Puget Sound fast food restaurant, founded 1951

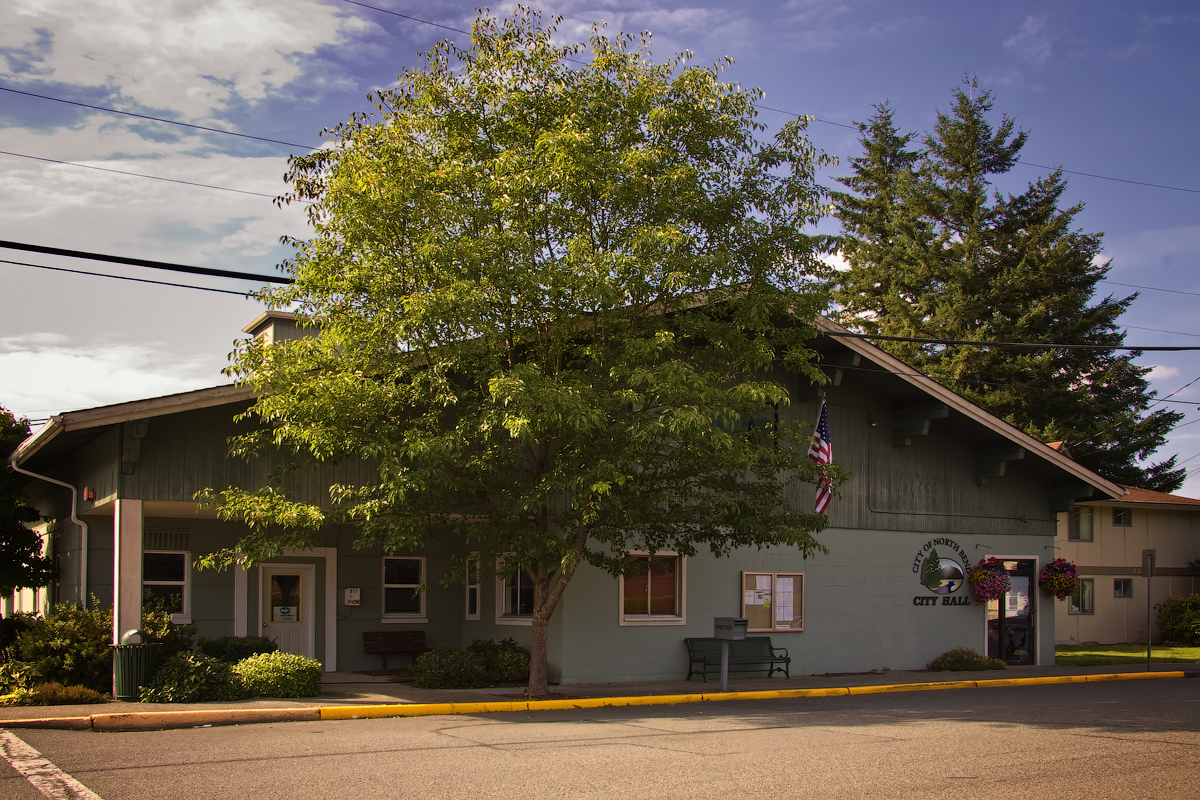
North Bend City Hall

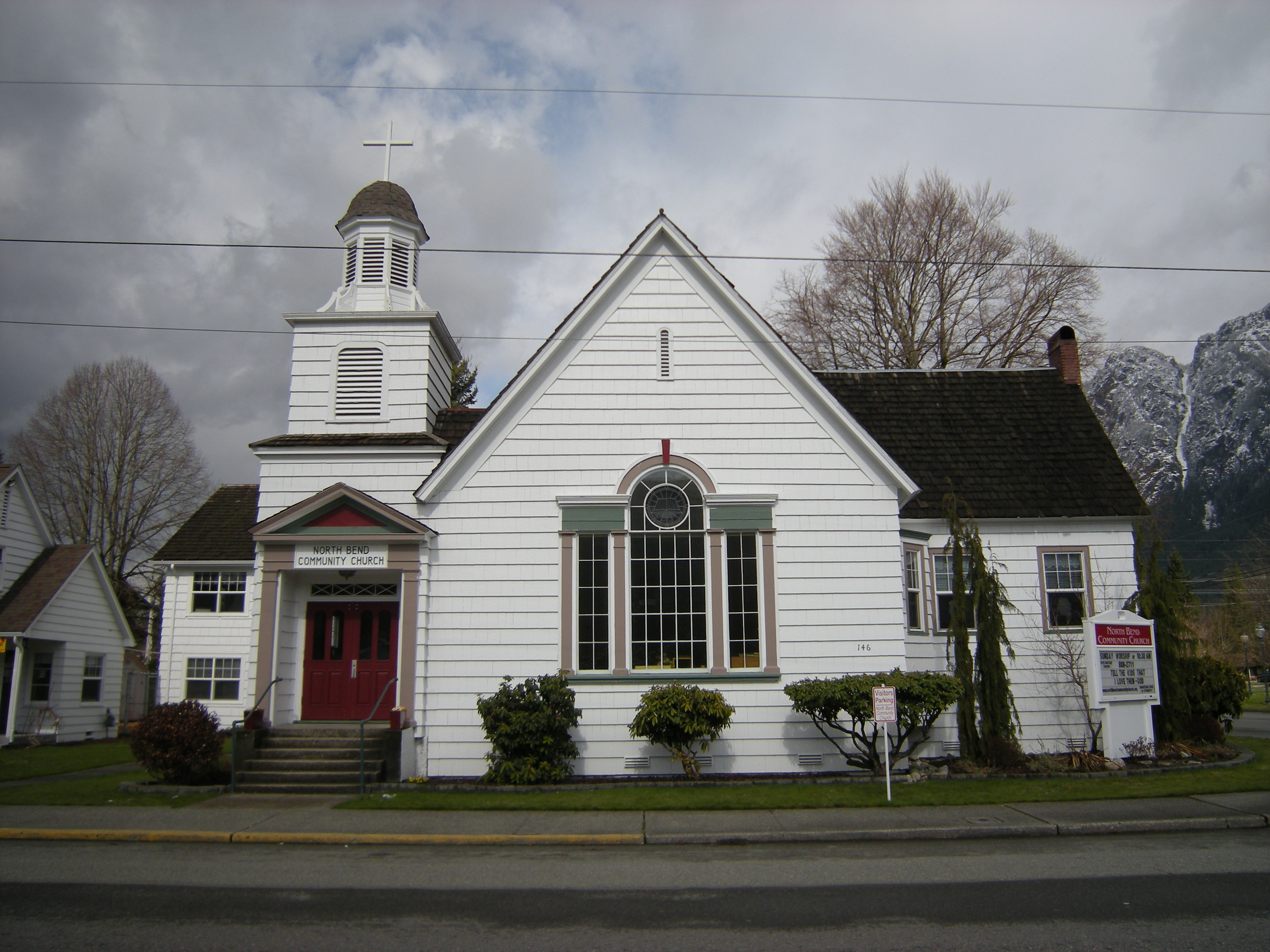
North Bend Community Church - founded 1898

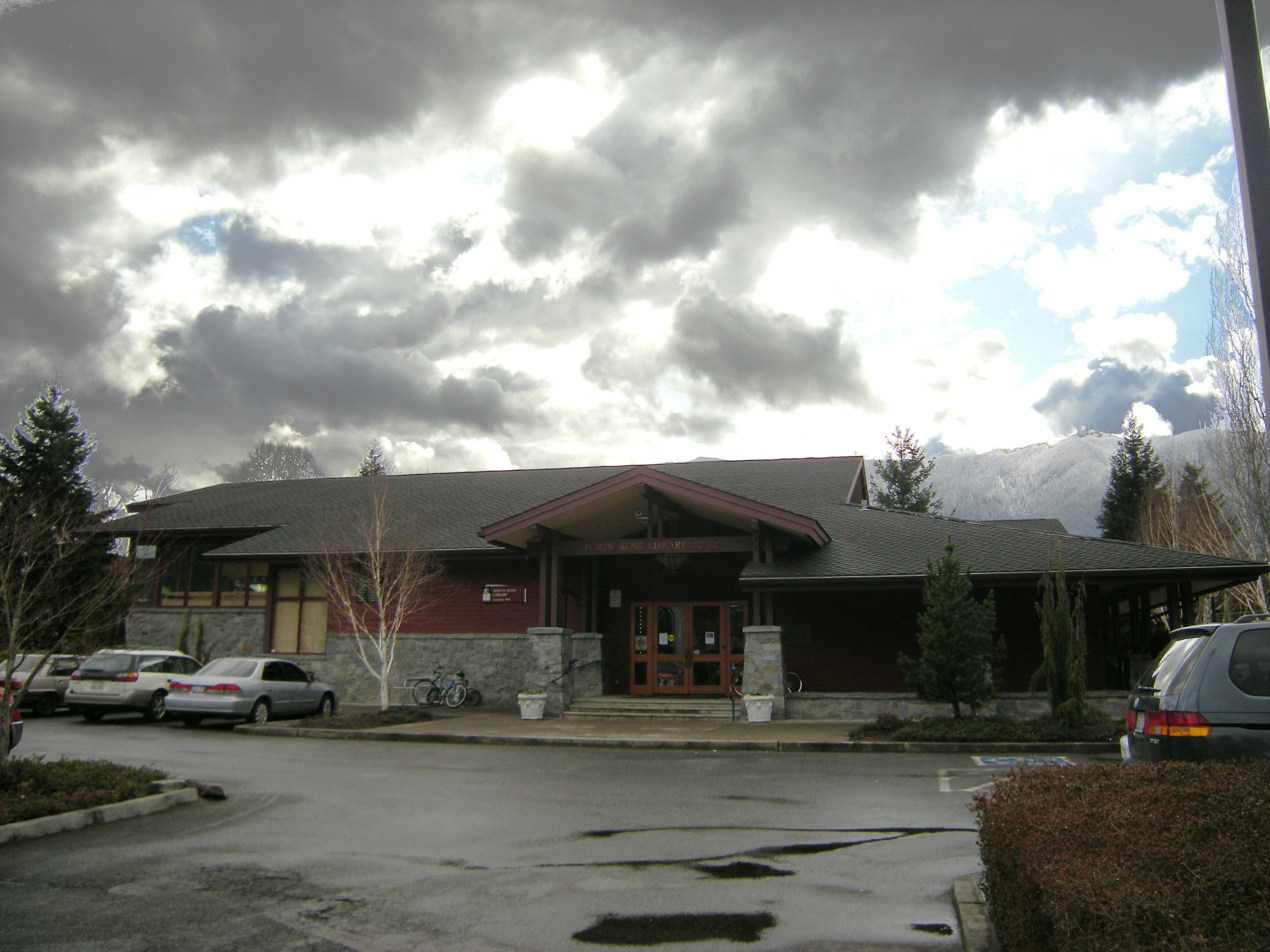
North Bend Public Library - founded 1946

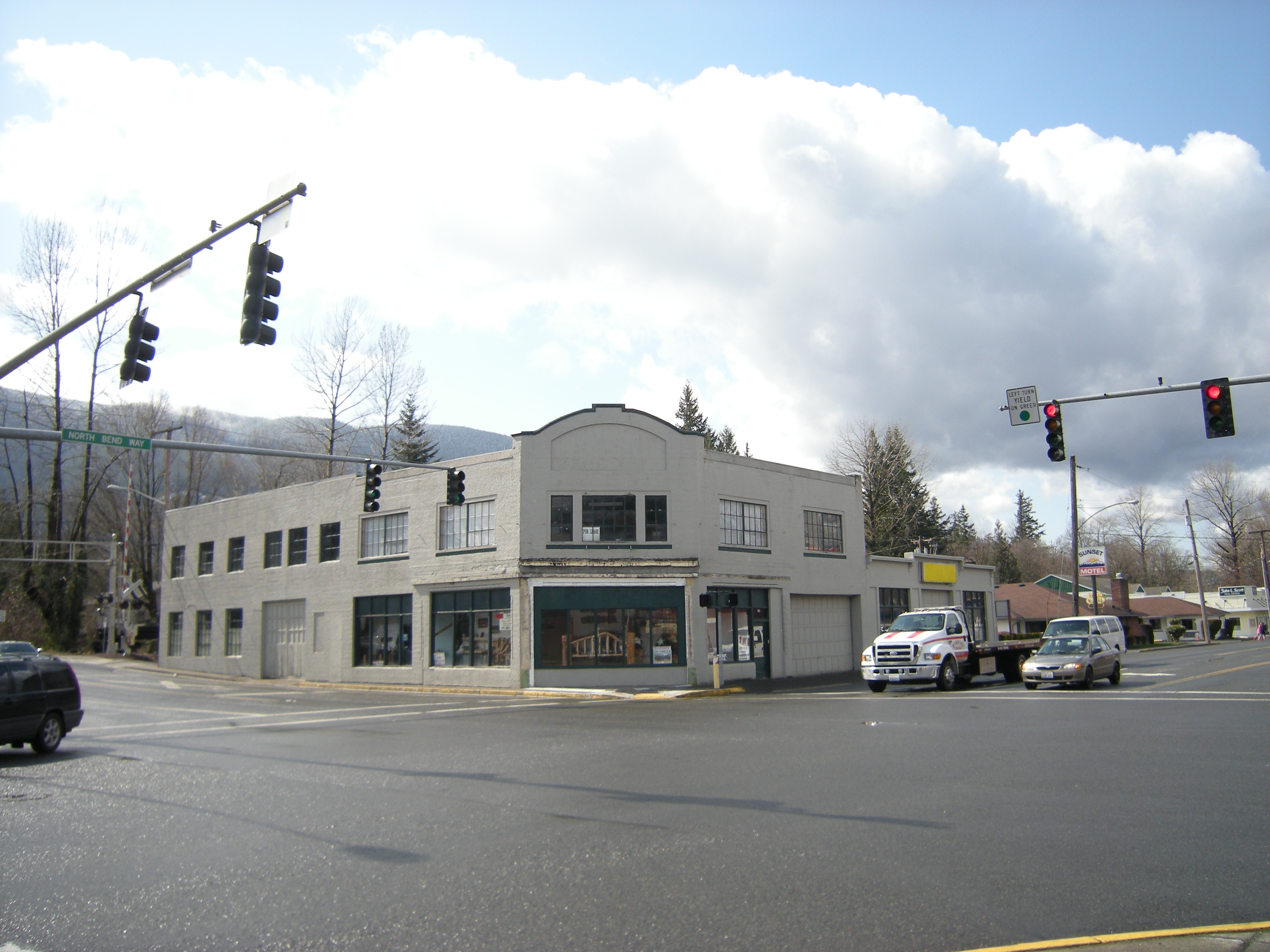
Historic Sunset Garage - under restoration

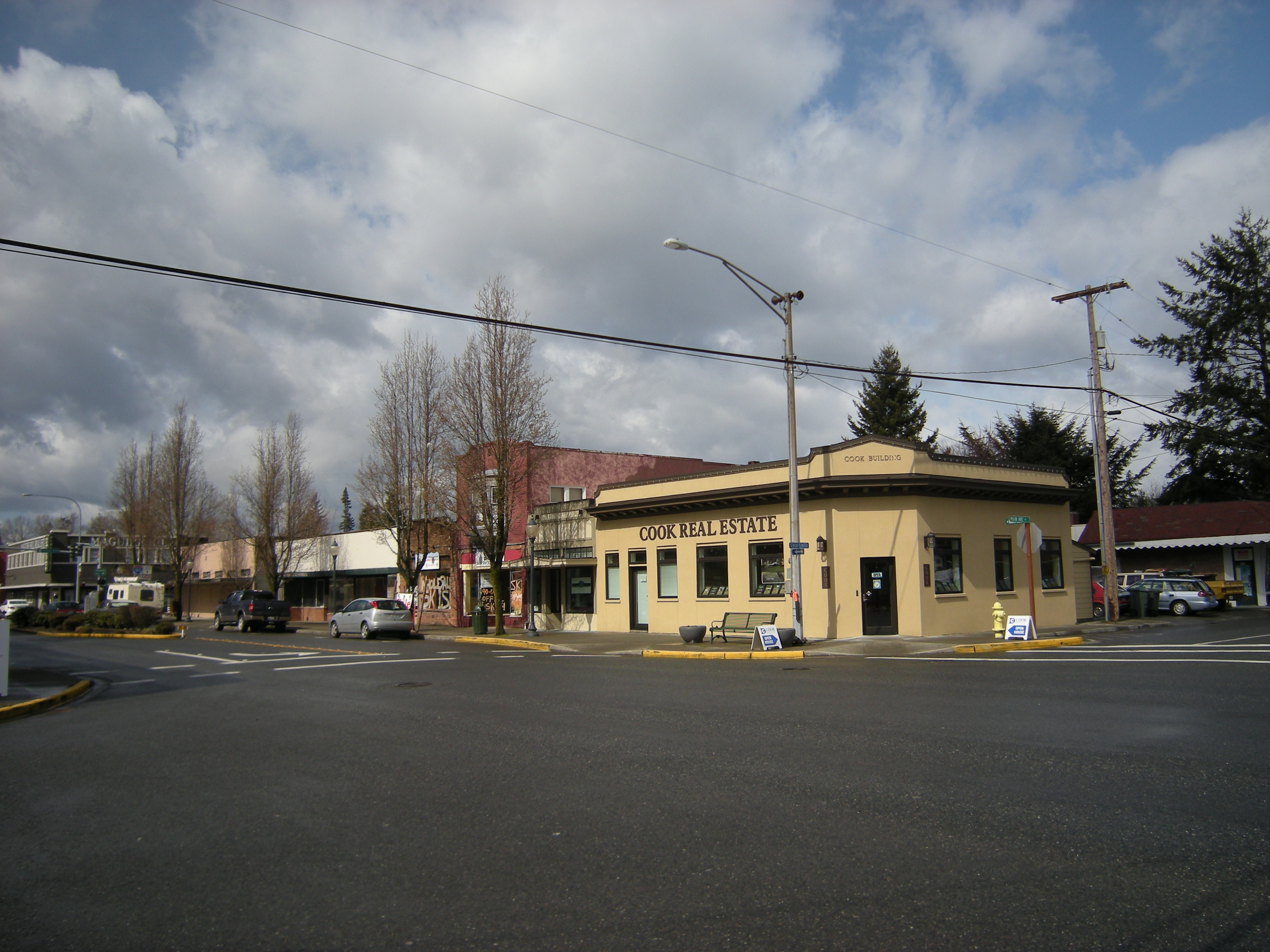
Historic Cook Building - restored

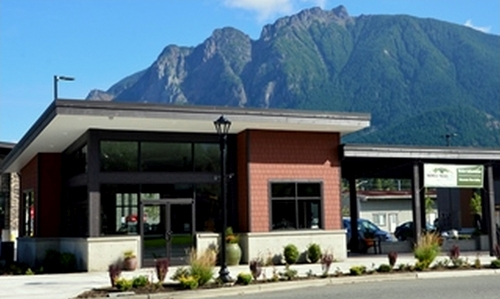
North Bend Visitor Center & Mountain View Art Gallery (2018; now closed)

== Economy ==
Throughout the 20th century North Bend has maintained gradual growth with an early economic focus on logging, sawmill production, agricultural and dairy farming. Currently, North Bend is for the largest part a bedroom community to Bellevue and Seattle. In addition, North Bend has a growing tourism economy centered around the North Bend Premium Outlet Mall, Northwest Railway Museum train activities and Snoqualmie Pass recreational commerce related to hiking, backpacking, mountain biking, skiing, snowboarding and cross-country skiing. North Bend also has approximately 400 employees working for Nintendo North Bend.

== Government and police ==
Presidential election results
Year	Republican	Democratic	Third Parties
2020	33.60% 1,602	62.48% 2,979	3.92% 187

The town has a mayor–council government with a seven-member city council that meets twice a month. The mayor is a separate position with four-year terms. Mary Miller was elected mayor in 2023.

North Bend leans Democratic much like the rest of King County, giving a majority of the vote to Joe Biden in the 2020 presidential election.

Law enforcement services in North Bend have changed hands several times. From 1973 until March 8, 2014, the town contracted with the King County Sheriff's Office for law enforcement services within town limits. It was KCSO's longest standing contract at the time of its conclusion. Since March 8, 2014, the town has contracted for law enforcement services with the City of Snoqualmie Police Department. On April 1, 2026, the city will once again contract with the King County Sheriff's Office for law enforcement, as the fourteen year contrcat with the city of Snoqualmie Police Department comes to a close.

== Landmarks ==
King County and the city of North Bend have designated the following landmarks:

Landmark	Built	Listed	Address	Photo
Camp Waskowitz; Namesake of Fritz Waskowitz	1935	1992	45509 SE 150th Street, North Bend	
Si View Pool and Activity Center (WPA Park Building)	1938–40	1984	400 SE Orchard Dr., North Bend	
North Bend Historic Commercial District	1889–1960	2000	Bendigo Blvd. & No. Bend Way	
Tollgate Farmhouse	c.1890	2002	SR 202 (near Boalch Avenue)	

== See also ==
- Alpine Lakes Wilderness
- Franklin Falls
- Iron Horse State Park
- Little Si
- Mount Washington (Cascades)
- North Bend Bar and Grill
- Olallie State Park
- Riverbend, Washington
- Twin Falls (Washington)
- Weeks Falls
