= Tenerife (disambiguation) =

Tenerife is an island of the province of Santa Cruz de Tenerife, Canary Islands, Spain.

Tenerife may also refer to:

== Places ==
=== Spain ===
- Province of Santa Cruz de Tenerife a province of the autonomous community of Canary Islands
- Santa Cruz de Tenerife, the capital of the Canary Islands
- Tenerife Airport (disambiguation)
- Pico de Tenerife, a mountain on the island of El Hierro

=== Elsewhere ===
- Teneriffe, Queensland, an inner city suburb in Brisbane, Australia
- Mount Teneriffe, a granite formation in Victoria in Australia
- Pico Teneriffe (Barbados), mountains in northeast Barbados
- Pic a Tenerife, a mountain in Gros Morne National Park, Canada
- Cerro Tenerife (Chile), a mountain in the Chilean Patagonia
- Tenerife, Magdalena, a town and municipality in Colombia
- San Carlos de Tenerife, a city in the Dominican Republic
- Mount Teneriffe (Washington), a mountain in Washington State, US
- Cerro Tenerife (Venezuela), a mountain
- Quebrada Tenerife, a hill in Venezuela
- Montes Teneriffe, a mountain range on the moon

== Other ==
- Tenerife CB, a Spanish basketball team based in Santa Cruz de Tenerife, Canary Islands, Spain
- 1399 Teneriffa, an asteroid
- CD Tenerife, a Spanish football club based in Santa Cruz de Tenerife, in the Canary Islands, Spain
- CV Tenerife, a Spanish volleyball club in Tenerife, Canary Islands, Spain
- Tenerife airport disaster (1977), the deadliest airport disaster in history, with 583 fatalities

== See also ==
- Teneriffe (disambiguation)
