= Teneriffe =

Teneriffe can refer to:

- Tenerife, Spanish island in the Atlantic Ocean
- Teneriffe, Queensland, suburb of Brisbane
- Teneriffe lace, type of lace made in Tenerife
- Montes Teneriffe, a mountain range on the northern part of the Moon's near side
- Mount Teneriffe, a mountain in Victoria, Australia
- Mount Teneriffe (Washington), a mountain in the United States
- Pico Teneriffe (Barbados), a cape on the north coast of Barbados
