= Mount Teneriffe =

Mount Teneriffe may refer to:

- Mount Teneriffe (Washington), a mountain in Washington state, United States
- Mount Teneriffe (Australia), a mountain in Queensland, Australia

== See also ==
- Montes Teneriffe, a mountain range on the moon
