= TCI =

TCI may refer to:

== Locations ==
- Tenerife Airport (disambiguation), airport code of Tenerife International Airport (1964–1978), still used as a code for the island of Tenerife in general
- Turks and Caicos Islands, UNDP country code

== Psychology ==
- Temperament and Character Inventory (TCI) of personality traits
- Theme-centered interaction, a method for social learning in groups
- Therapeutic Crisis Intervention, protocol used in residential childcare facilities

== Organizations and companies ==
- Tall Clubs International, organization of clubs of tall people in North America
- Tele-Communications Inc., former US cable television company
- Telecommunication Company of Iran
- Televisione Cristiana in Italia, an Italian religious television channel
- Telus Communications Inc., a Canadian telecommunications subsidiary of Telus Corporation
- Tennessee Coal, Iron and Railroad Company, former steel manufacturer, Alabama, USA
- Texas Correctional Industries, division of Texas Department of Criminal Justice, USA
- The Children's Investment Fund Management, UK hedge fund management
- Thistletown Collegiate Institute, a school in Toronto, Canada
- Touring Club Italiano
- Tokyo Chemical Industry, a global manufacturer of specialty organic chemicals
- Toyota Canada Inc.
- Transport Corporation of India
- Transportation and Climate Initiative, a proposed interstate compact

== Other ==
- Tag Control Information, a data field in IEEE 802.1Q VLAN tagging
- Taoist Church of Italy, a confessional religious body of Taoism in Italy
- Target controlled infusion, a method of administering general anaesthesia
