= Dirty Harry's Peak =

Mountain in the State of Washington, US

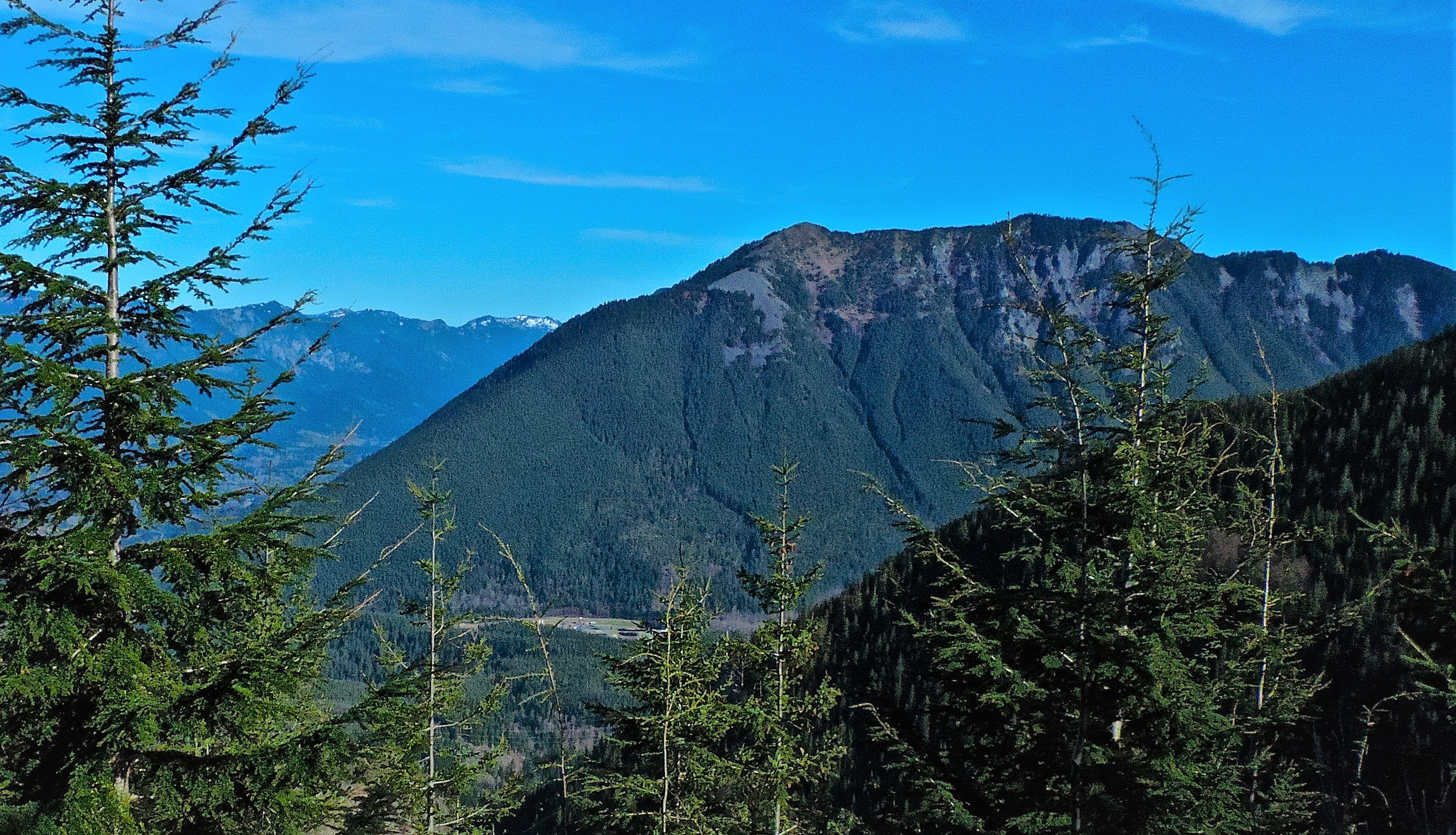
- Mailbox Peak, and Dirty Harry's Peak on the right side of the image

Highest point
- Elevation: 4,724 ft (1,440 m) NAVD 88
- Prominence: 200 ft (61 m)
- Parent peak: Dirtybox Peak
- Isolation: 0.55 mi (0.89 km)
- Coordinates: 47°27′04″N 121°37′17″W

Naming
- Etymology: Harry Gault

Geography
- Location within Washington (state)
- Location: King County, Washington, US
- Parent range: Cascades
- Topo map: USGS North Bend

Climbing
- Easiest route: Hike

Dirty Harry's Peak is a mountain in the state of Washington. It is named for Harry Gault, who once logged the mountain. It is located in the Middle Fork Snoqualmie Natural Resources Conservation Area, near the Washington State Fire Training Academy. The mountain has an elevation of 4,724 feet (1,440 m) and lies along a ridgeline including Mailbox Peak and Dirtybox Peak (the parent peak of both mountains, and a portmanteau of their names).

The hike to the peak includes a popular viewpoint named Dirty Harry's Balcony, elevation 2,613 feet (796 m), with views of surrounding mountains and I-90. Further along the trail is Gault's abandoned truck, known as "Dirty Harry's Museum." The summit can be accessed either through the official trail, or a scramble along the ridgeline including Mailbox and Dirtybox.

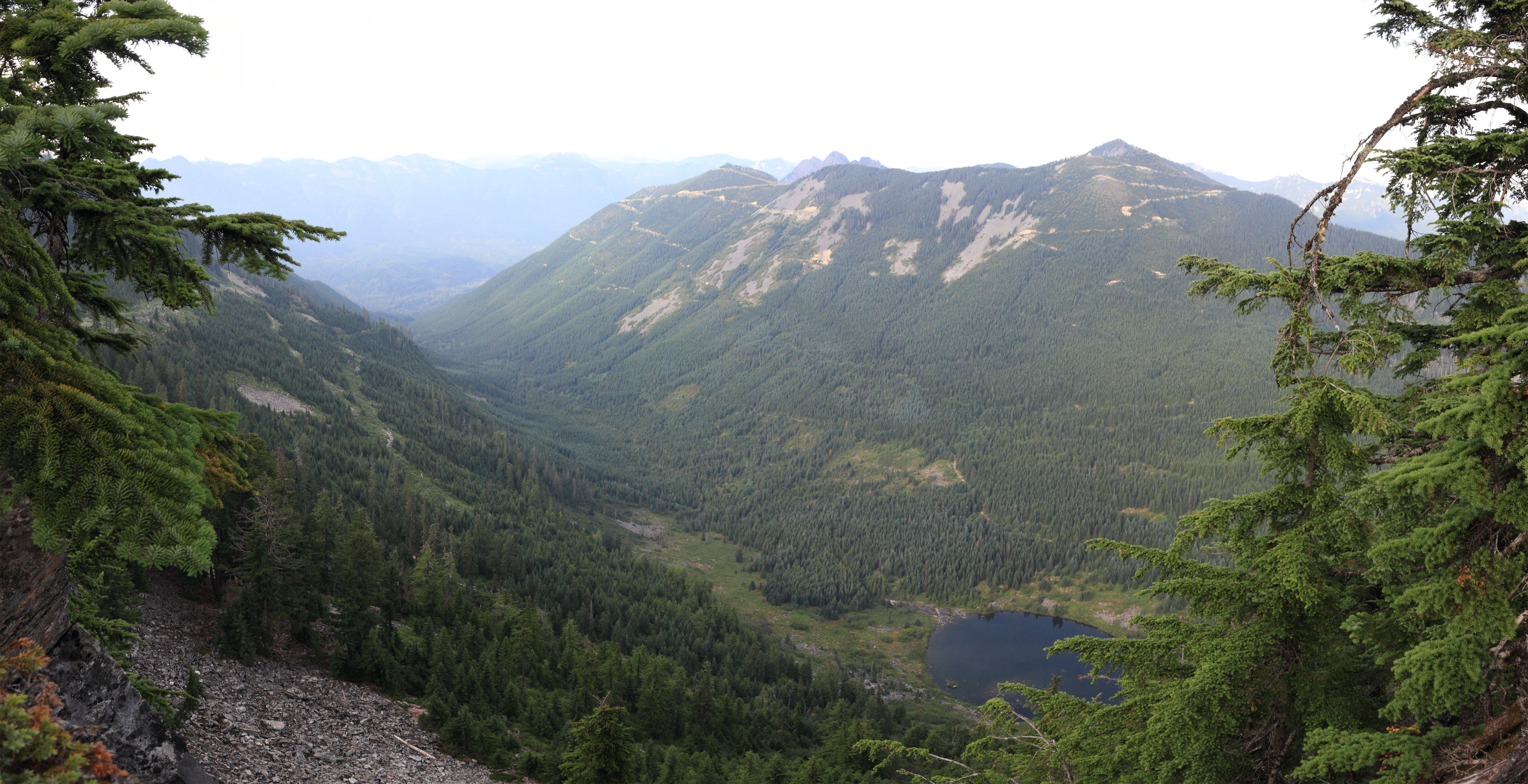
View from the summit, looking east

== See also ==
- Mailbox Peak
- Washington State Fire Training Academy
