= Washington State Patrol =

State police of the U.S. state of Washington

- Patch of Washington State Patrol

- Logo of Washington State Patrol
- Abbreviation: WSP
- Motto: Service With Humility

Agency overview
- Formed: 1921; 105 years ago
- Employees: 2,400 (2024)
- Annual budget: $882 million (2023-2024)

Jurisdictional structure
- Operations jurisdiction: Washington (state), US
- Washington State Patrol Districts
- Area: 71,362 square miles (184,830 km^{2})
- Population: 7.614 million (2019)
- General nature: Civilian police

Operational structure
- Headquarters: Olympia, Washington
- Troopers: 1,100 (as of 2016)
- Civilian employees: 1,100 (as of 2016)
- Agency executive: John R. Batiste, Chief
- Units: List: Patrol; Aviation; ADAT; Detective; Bomb Squad; SWAT; Honor Guard; Canine; Executive Protection; Training
- Bureaus: List: Office of the Chief; Field Operations Bureau; Commercial Vehicle Enforcement Bureau; State Fire Marshal and Fire Protection Bureau; Forensic Laboratory Services Bureau; Investigative Services Bureau; Technical Services Bureau; Specialty Teams

Website
- wsp.wa.gov

The Washington State Patrol (WSP) is the state patrol agency for the U.S. state of Washington. Organized as the Washington State Highway Patrol in 1921, it was renamed and reconstituted in 1933. The agency is charged with the protection of the Governor of Washington and the grounds of the Washington State Capitol; security aboard the vessels and terminals of the Washington State Ferries; law enforcement on interstate and state highways in Washington; and providing specialized support to local law enforcement including laboratory forensic services, mobile field forces during periods of civil unrest or disaster, and tactical teams. The State Fire Marshal's Office, responsible for operation of the Washington State Fire Training Academy and for certain aspects of civil defense mobilization, is a component office of the Washington State Patrol, and the State Patrol is the managing agency of the Washington Fusion Center, which coordinates anti-terrorist and anti-organized crime activities within Washington.

State Patrol commissioned personnel, known as "troopers", have jurisdiction throughout Washington, with the exception of federal property and the territory of Indian nations.

== History ==
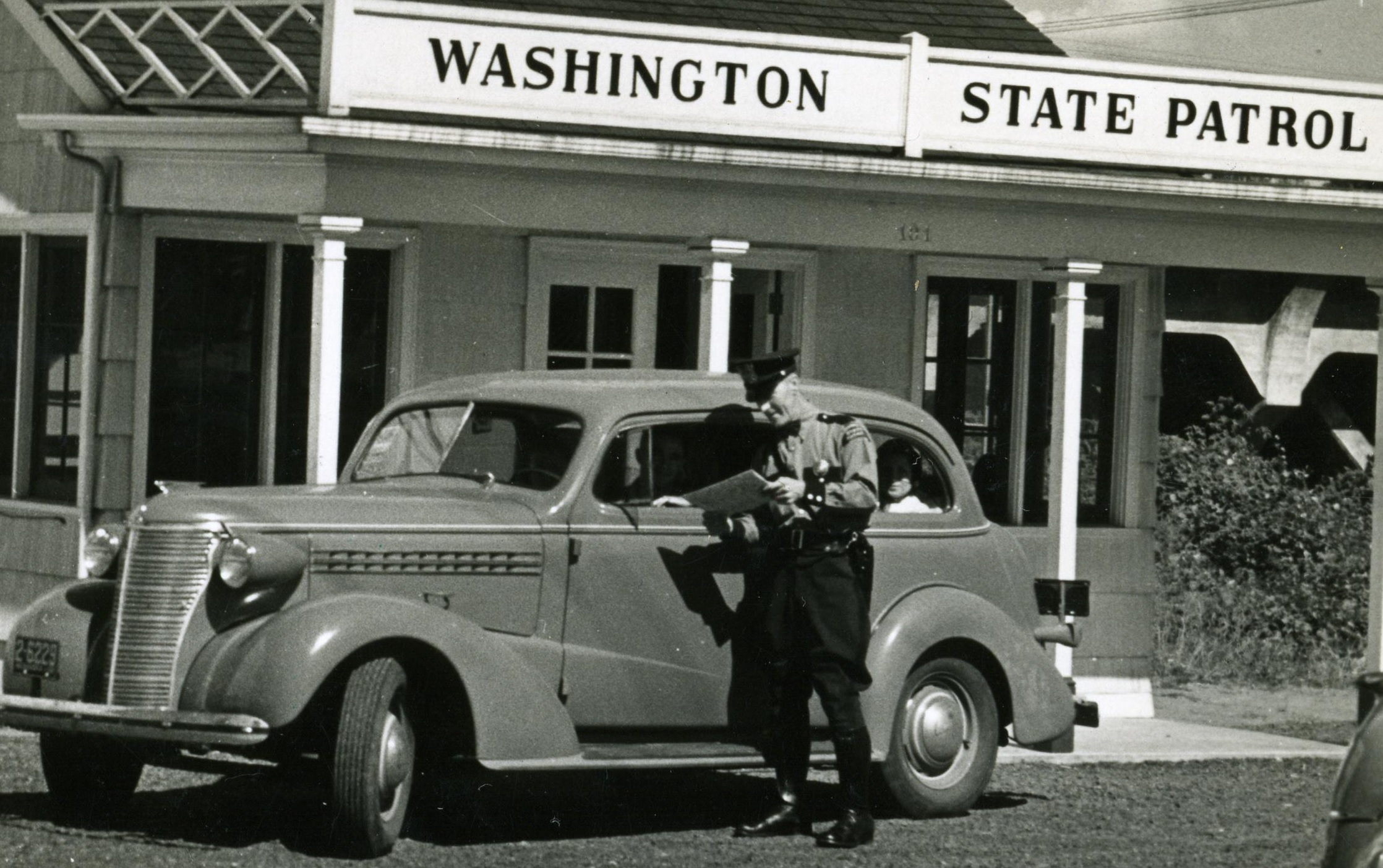
A Washington State Patrol trooper is pictured speaking to motorists in Clark County in 1938

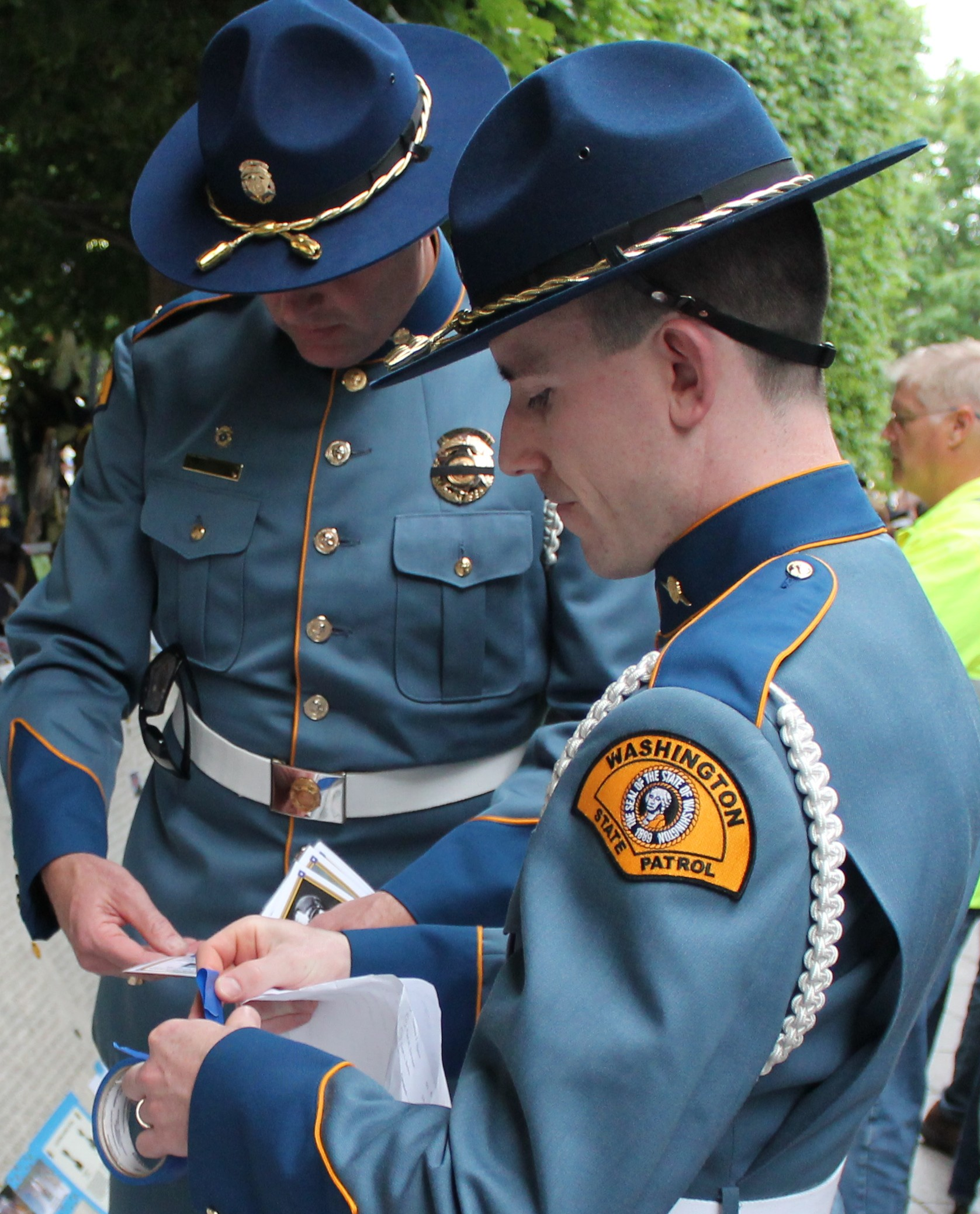
Two troopers of the Washington State Patrol pictured in 2012

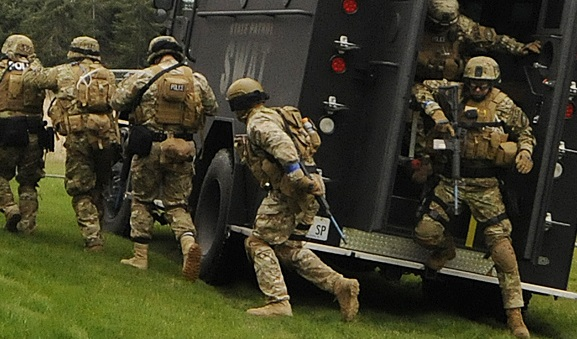
The WSP SWAT team is pictured during a 2013 exercise

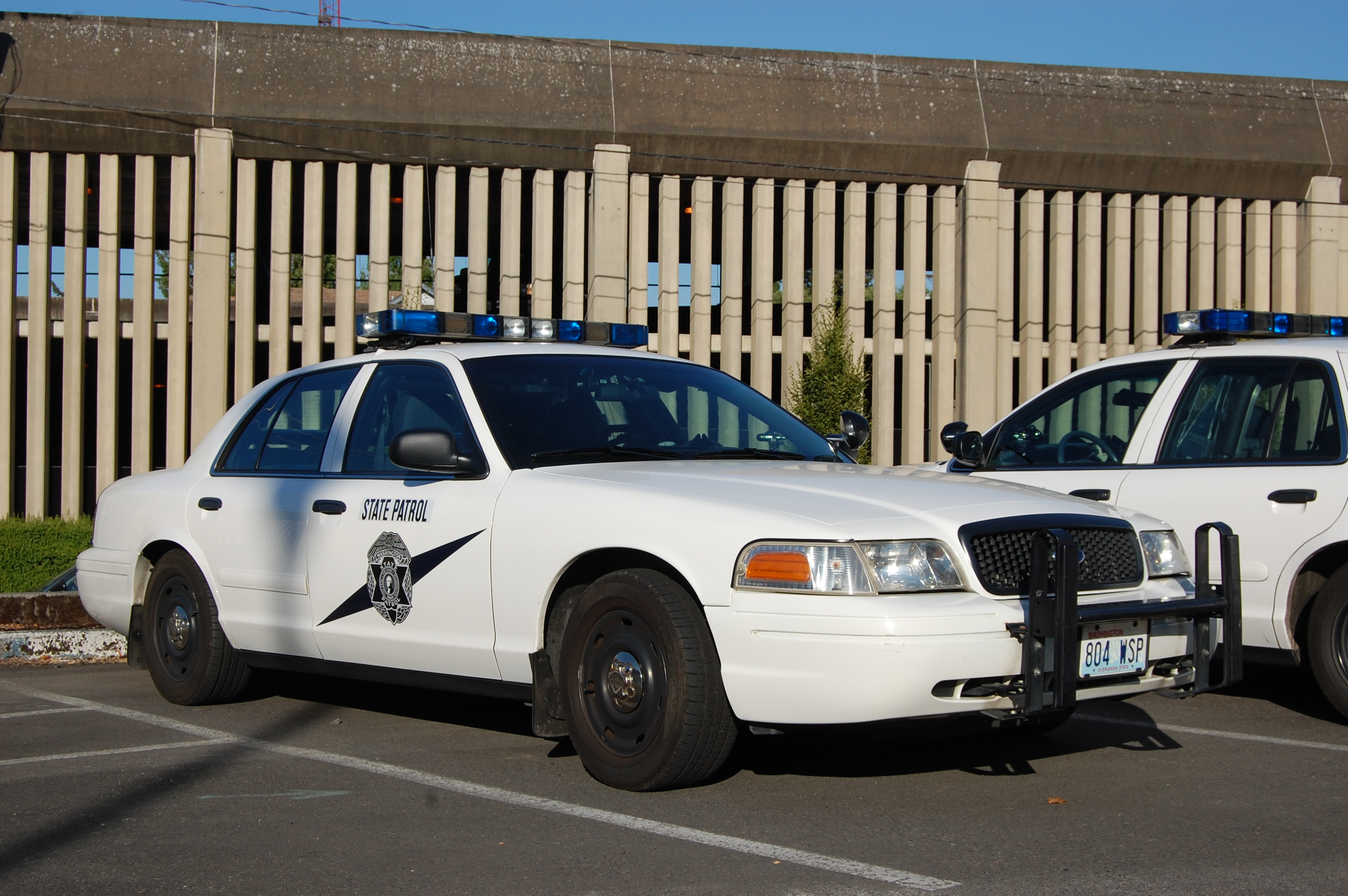
Washington State Patrol Ford Crown Victoria Police Interceptor

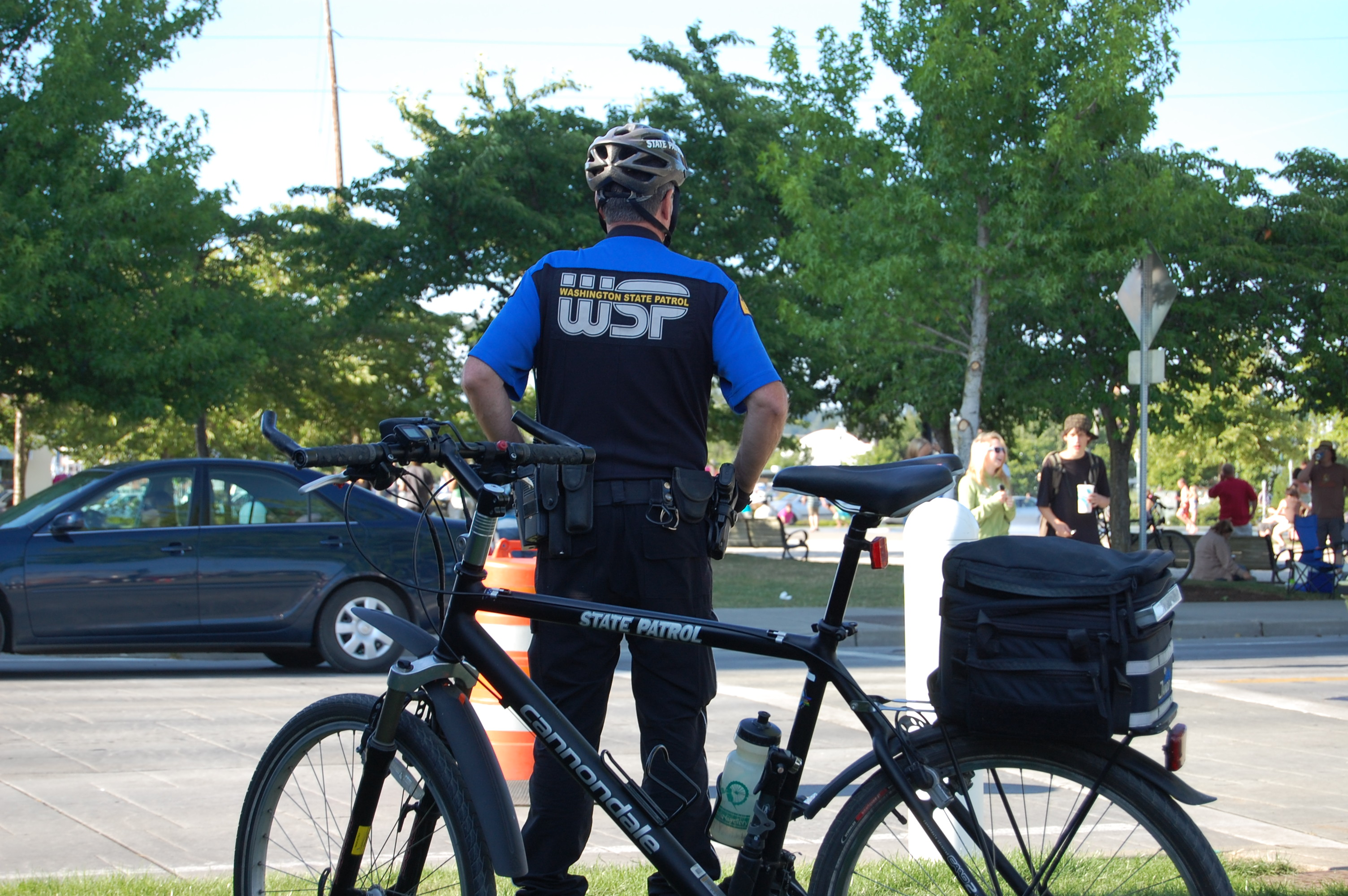
A Washington State Trooper patrols the shores of Capitol Lake during Lakefair in Olympia, Washington

The Washington State Highway Patrol was created by statute in 1921 to provide traffic enforcement on the state's principal motorways. In 1933 the force was reconstituted as the Washington State Patrol and organized as an armed, mobile police force that, in addition to traffic duties, could be rapidly deployed and concentrated in areas of the state undergoing public order emergencies. Six years later a Criminal Investigation Division was added and, in 1947, the WSP academy established in former U.S. Navy barracks in Shelton, Washington.

By the early 1960s the State Patrol had established a reputation as the state's most elite law enforcement agency, with more than 400 applicants annually applying for about 25 openings, and an annual turnover of about five percent. In 1965, the State Patrol was given sole jurisdiction of Interstate 5 through Seattle by the Seattle Police Department after previous collaboration.

In 1963 the Washington State Patrol began referring to its commissioned personnel as "troopers" instead of "patrolmen". The change was made to standardize practices in Washington with those of other states. In 1975 Cathy Swanson and Carolyn Pemberton, the first two female troopers, were commissioned. Twenty years later, in 1995, the first female chief of the State Patrol, Annette Sandberg, was appointed.

Eight troopers faced termination in a fake diploma scam discovered in 2009. Troopers who had earned a two-year degree were entitled to a 2% pay raise and those who had earned a bachelor's were entitled to a 4% pay raise. Eight troopers, who were identified during the course of a federal investigation into a diploma mill, were discovered to have submitted fake diplomas along with applications for a pay increase. A State Patrol spokesman reported that the agency intended to fire the troopers.

== Organization ==
=== Administration ===
The State Patrol is administered by a chief who is appointed by the Governor of Washington to serve at his pleasure, by and with the consent of the state senate.

=== Specialized units ===
Specialized units of the State Patrol include SWAT, charged with providing tactical support in high-risk situations; the Rapid Deployment Forces, composed of five mobile field forces based in Tacoma, Bellevue, Spokane, Marysville, and Bremerton; the Motors Team, consisting of 42 motorcycle-deployed troopers operating on Interstate 5; the Honor Guard, providing ceremonial support during official funerals and other special events; and the Criminal Investigations Division and the Investigative Assistance Division, charged with investigating serious crimes or assisting local law enforcement in doing so, when requested.

The State Patrol also is responsible for management of the Washington Fusion Center, which coordinates anti-terrorist and anti-organized crime operations among federal, state, and local law enforcement in Washington.

==== Executive Services Section ====
The Executive Services Section consists of the Executive Protection Unit, charged with the protection of the governor and his family, and the governor-elect; the Governor's Mansion Detachment, responsible for securing the grounds of the executive residence; and the Capitol Campus Detachment, which provides law enforcement on the 435-acre portion of the city of Olympia in which the primary government facilities, including the Washington State Capitol and the Temple of Justice, are located.

==== Vessel and Terminal Security (VATS) ====
Vessel and Terminal Security (VATS) is divided into three operating regions – Bremerton, Marysville, and Seattle – and is tasked with providing shipboard law enforcement on Washington State Ferries vessels, monitoring a network of CCTV cameras deployed aboard vessels and at ferry terminals, and screening passengers and passenger vehicles prior to embarkation.

=== Patrol districts ===
Each patrol district is responsible for operations in one or more counties:

1. Tacoma: Pierce and Thurston Counties
2. Bellevue: King County
3. Yakima: Asotin, Benton, Columbia, Franklin, Garfield, Walla Walla and Yakima Counties
4. Spokane: Adams, Ferry, Lincoln, Pend Oreille, Spokane, Stevens and Whitman Counties
5. Vancouver: Clark, Cowlitz, Klickitat, Lewis and Skamania Counties
6. Wenatchee: Chelan, Douglas, Grant, Kittitas and Okanogan Counties
7. Marysville: Island, San Juan, Skagit, Snohomish and Whatcom Counties
8. Bremerton: Clallam, Grays Harbor, Jefferson, Kitsap, Mason, Pacific and Wahkiakum Counties

== Personnel ==
=== Training ===
Candidates to become state troopers first undergo seven weeks of "arming training" which is conducted at the 190-acre Washington State Patrol Academy in Shelton. During this period, candidates undergo extensive physical training, as well as firearms orientation and defensive techniques. Upon successful completion of arming training, candidates are advanced to a Trooper Basic Cadet Class which consists of 28 weeks of classroom instruction covering water rescue, emergency vehicle operation, collision and crime scene investigation, criminal law, and other topics in police science. The course concludes with a further eight weeks of field training during which the cadet works alongside a veteran trooper during the course of his or her regular duties.

Following completion of the 33 weeks of arming training and the Trooper Basic Cadet Course, candidates are administered the Troopers' Oath in the rotunda of the Washington State Capitol by the Chief Justice of the Washington Supreme Court and then commissioned as peace officers by the Governor of Washington.

The Washington State Patrol Academy is used to exclusively train State Patrol troopers; all other law enforcement officers in the state are trained by the Washington Criminal Justice Training Commission (CJTC) Law Enforcement Academy. However, the CJTC utilizes the State Patrol Academy and its EVOC instructors for its nationally acclaimed emergency vehicle operations course. Unlike the CJTC academy, the WSP academy is a residential academy and cadets are barracked on-campus during training.

== Equipment ==
=== Uniforms ===
Commissioned personnel of the Washington State Highway Patrol began wearing uniforms – consisting of grey jackets and riding breeches with brown leather accessories – in 1924, three years after the force was established. Prior to this personnel wore civilian attire with metal badges. In 1928 the Highway Patrol's uniforms switched to a green pattern with black leather accoutrements. In 1937, four years after the force was reconstituted as the Washington State Patrol, blue uniforms were adopted and neckties were replaced with bowties; the longer form of neckwear had a tendency to flap in the breeze when a trooper was on motorcycle duty. The State Patrol switched from wearing peaked hats to campaign hats in 1963.

In 2007 the National Association of Uniform Manufacturers and Distributors named the Washington State Patrol the "Best-Dressed State Law Enforcement Agency" in the United States. The State Patrol adopted a modified duty uniform in 2017. Though visually similar to the State Patrol's former uniforms, the new uniforms were constructed of a breathable, sweat-wicking fabric, instead of wool. According to the State Patrol, the modified uniform was adopted as it was easier to clean and more comfortable to wear.

=== Vehicles ===
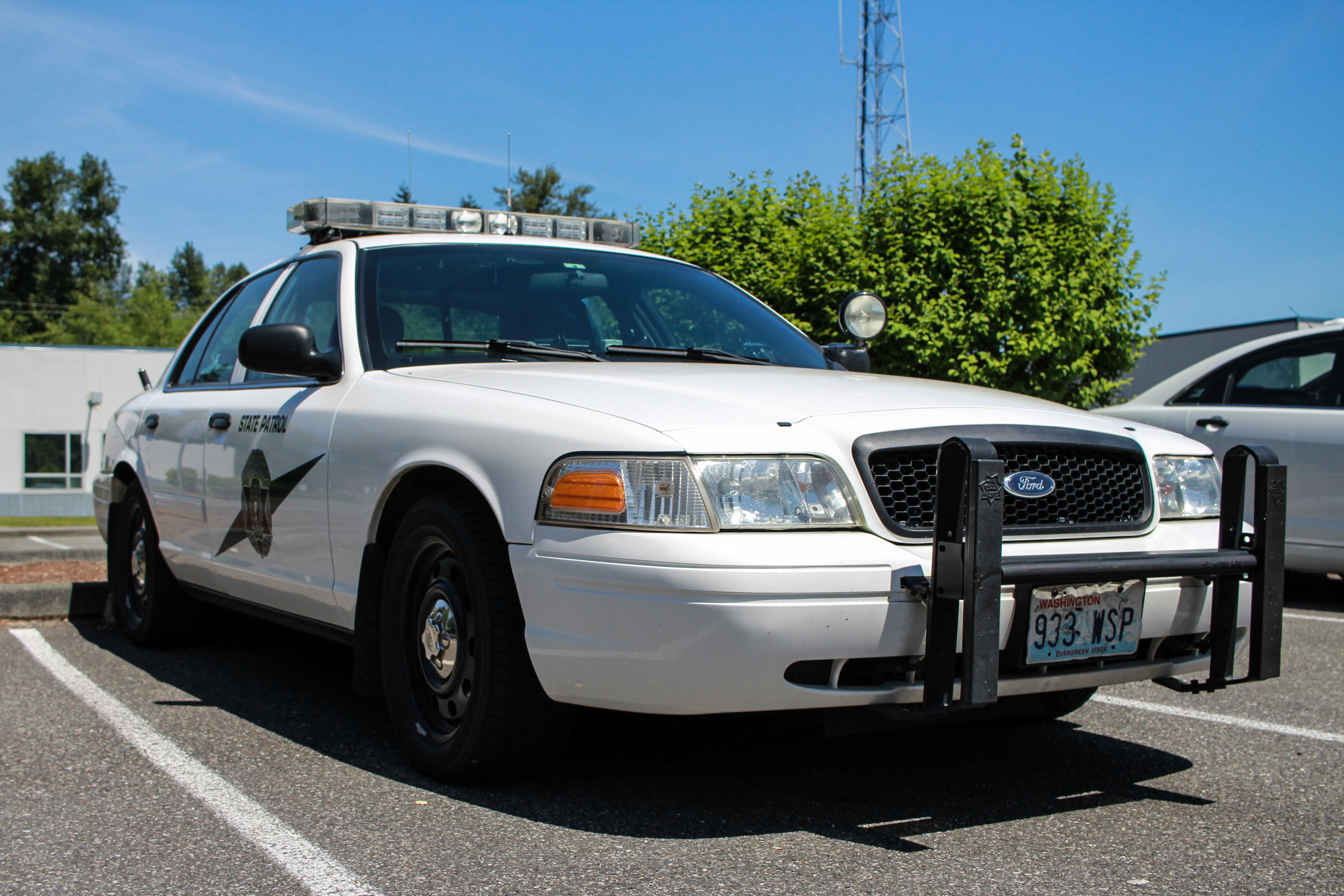
A Ford Crown Victoria Police Interceptor in WSP service

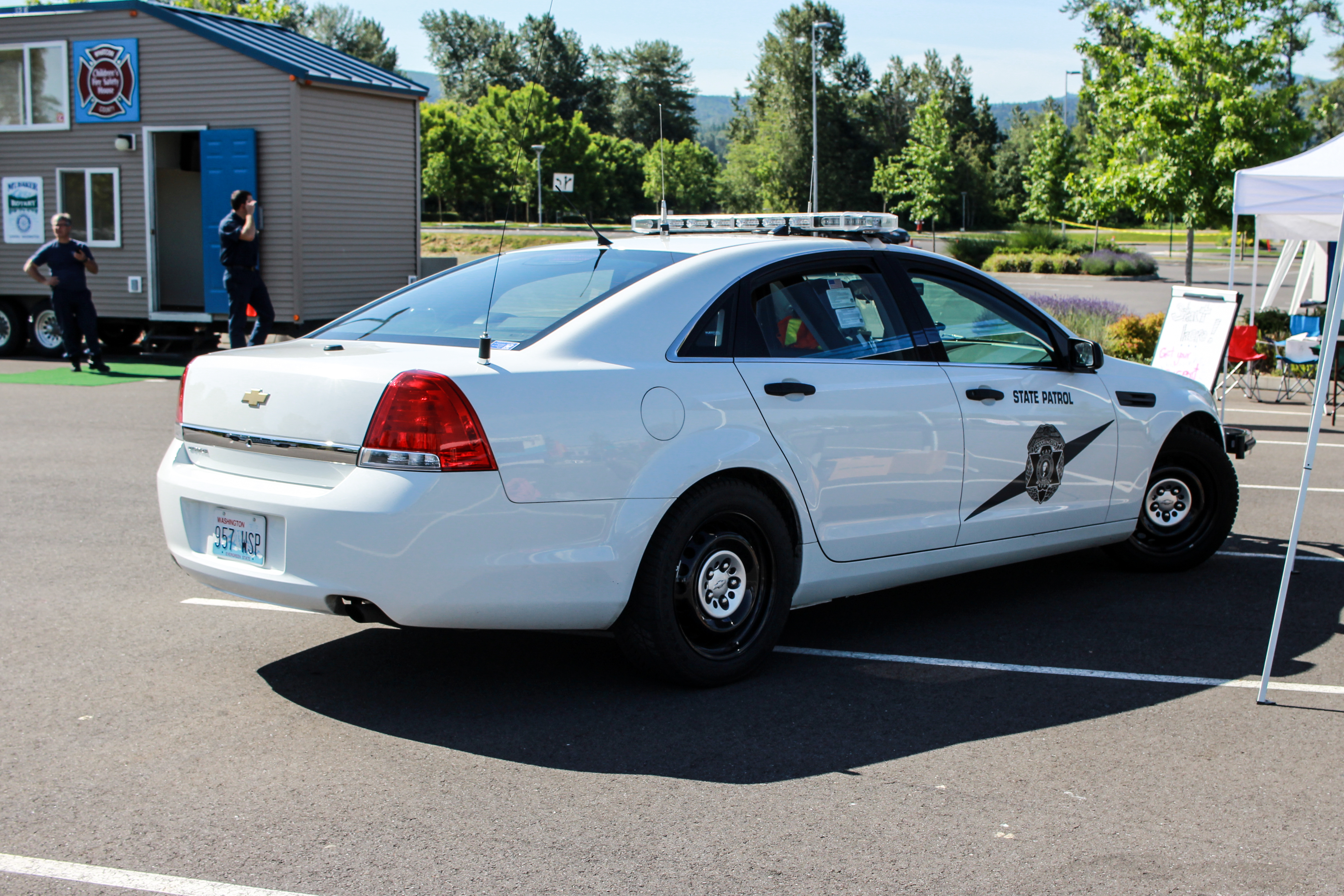
Newer Chevrolet Caprice PPV in WSP service

In the early 1980s, the State Patrol operated the Dodge Diplomat, with several Ford Mustangs arriving in 1983. From the late 1980s to 2012, the Ford Crown Victoria was its primary vehicle. Beginning in 2012, this model began to be cycled out in favor of the Chevrolet Caprice PPV. The Patrol currently uses Ford Police Package Explorers, harkening back to their original use panel vans for patrol duties.

The State Patrol also operates two Bearcat armored vehicles for tactical operations.

As of 2017, the Aviation Section managed a fleet of seven fixed wing aircraft which operate under the call sign "Smokey".

== Communications ==
Washington State Patrol has its own statewide analog, non-trunked, repeater-based, VHF radio network that covers the state. Towers for this network can be seen near highways and look like cell sites, but with longer antennas. However, as of January 1, 2013, all radio systems used by WSP will move to a conventional digital format called P25 and all old analog equipment will be taken out of service. In August, 2004, one of these towers near Vancouver, Washington was damaged by an arsonist, taking out Washington State Patrol communications in Clark County.

Washington State Patrol dispatchers handle statewide law enforcement dispatching and radio communications for the Washington State Patrol, Fish & Wildlife Police Officers of the Washington Department of Fish & Wildlife ("Wildlife" units), Law Enforcement Officers of the Washington Department of Natural Resources ("DNR" units), Law Enforcement Officers of the US Forest Service ("Forest" units), Federal Wildlife Officers of the US Fish & Wildlife Service, Liquor Enforcement Officers of the Liquor and Cannabis Board ("Liquor" units), Park Rangers of the Washington State Parks ("Parks" units), and the WSDOT incident response team ("Transportation" units), which work closely with WSP.

== Laboratories ==
Washington State Patrol operates seven crime laboratories: full-service labs in Seattle, Tacoma, Marysville and Cheney, and limited-service laboratories in Vancouver, Kennewick and Tumwater. The Washington State Patrol crime lab system provides service to all city and county law enforcement agencies in the state.

In 2021, samples from the Washington State Patrol Toxicology Lab found residual levels of cocaine, meth, and other drugs within the lab. The sampling was conducted after the lab disclosed a second false positive for meth that year, although false positives had turned up in test results since a lab expansion in 2018. The contamination was only disclosed to legal defense groups in August 2020 through a potential impeachment disclosure, which included email exchanges from July 2019 in which the agency had notified its accreditation agency of the contamination. One judge who presided over a case involving false positives ruled that the lab performing testing in a contaminated area amounted to "gross governmental mismanagement".

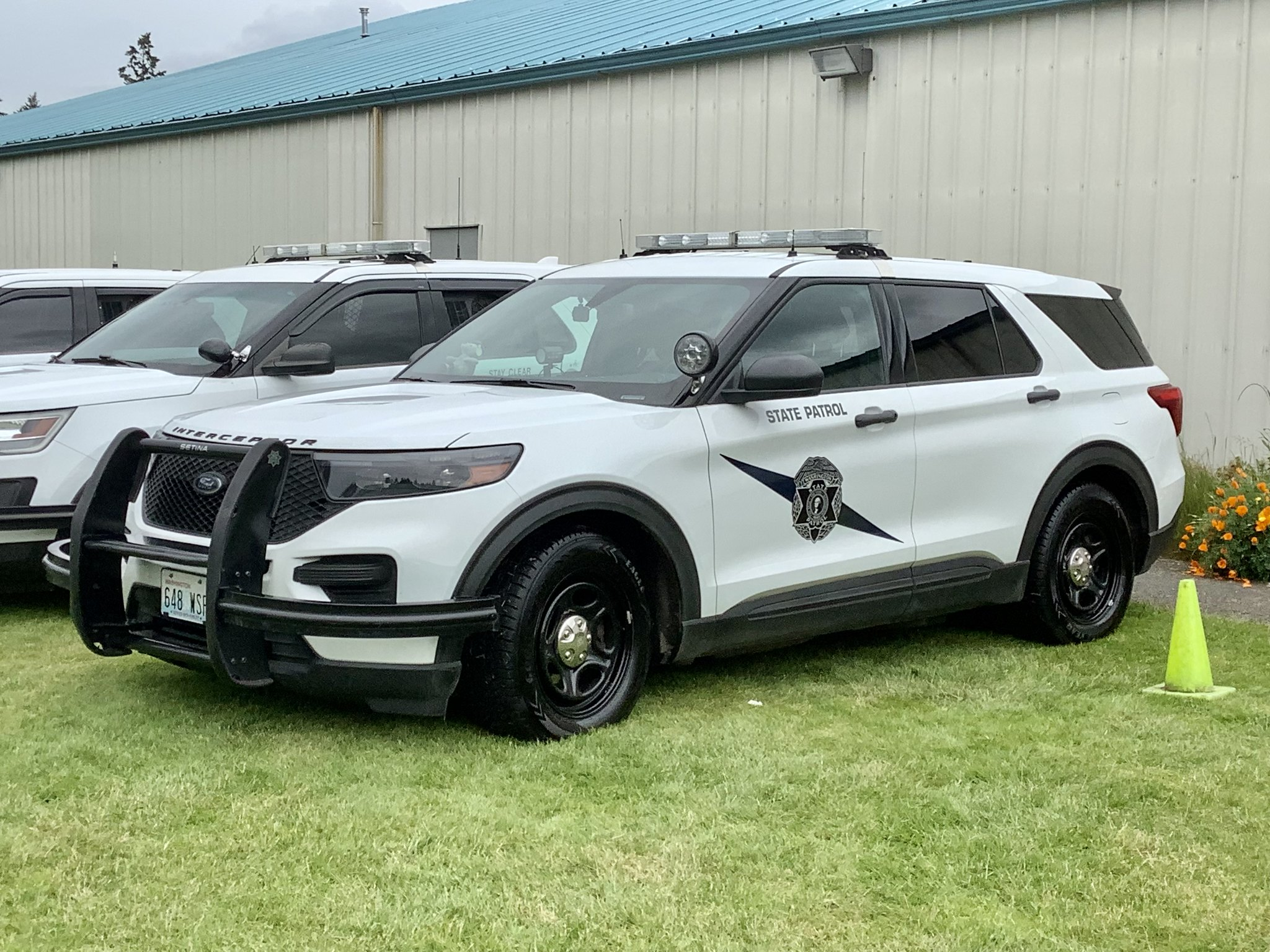
A WSP Ford Police Interceptor Utility (FPIU), pictured in 2022

== Fallen officers ==
As of 2025, 34 commissioned personnel of the State Patrol, and its predecessor the Highway Patrol, have died in the line of duty. Patrolman Vernon G. Fortin was the first killed, dying in 1923 following a motorcycle crash. Five personnel have fallen to gunfire; Patrolman John H. Gulden was the first to die of gunshot, which he received while attempting to apprehend a pair of robbers in 1942.

== See also ==
- List of law enforcement agencies in Washington (state)
- Highway patrol
