= Mailbox Peak =

Mountain in Washington (state), United States

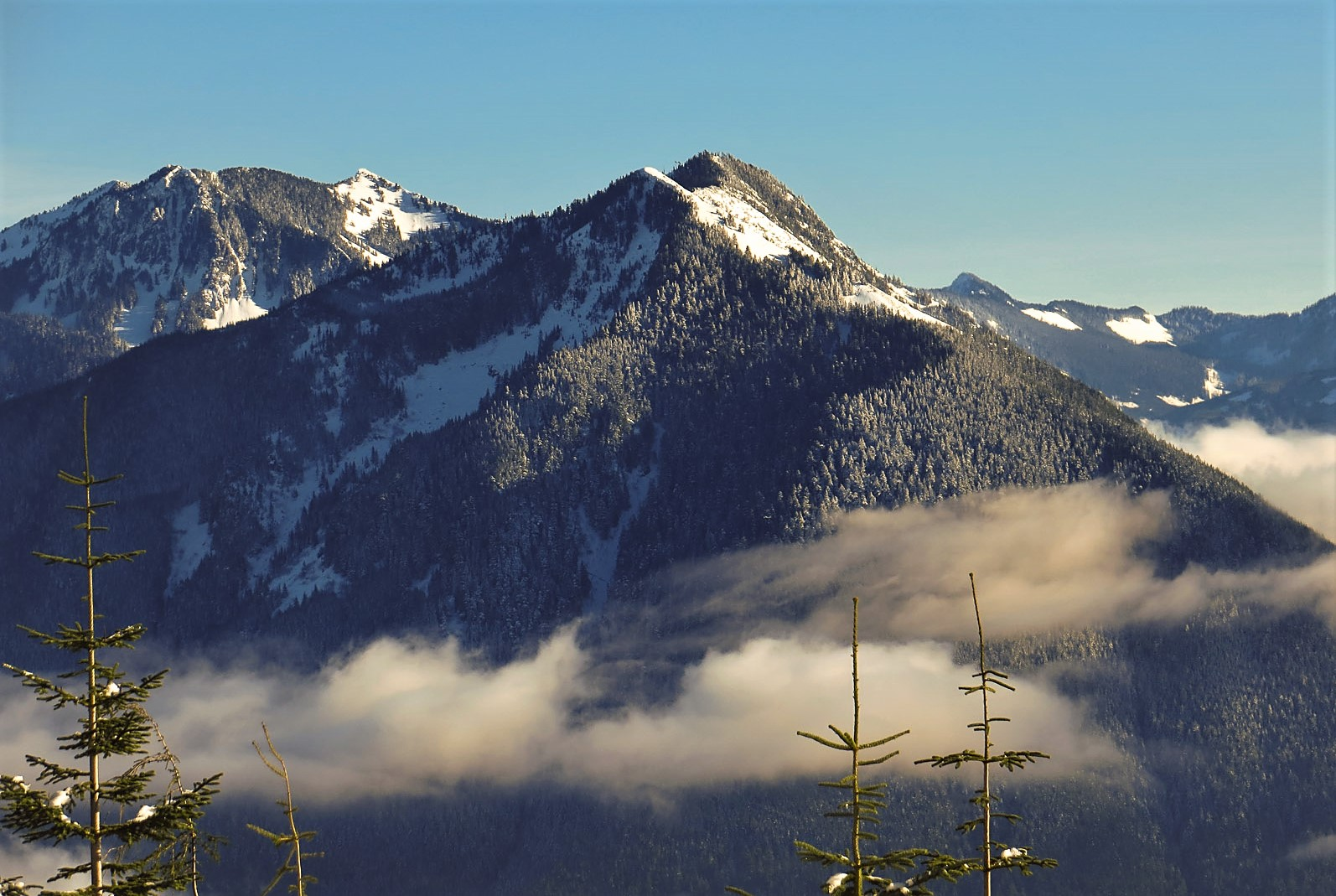
- Northwest aspect, from Mt. Teneriffe

Highest point
- Elevation: 4,841 ft (1,476 m)
- Prominence: 121 ft (37 m)
- Parent peak: Dirtybox Peak
- Isolation: 0.42 mi (0.68 km)
- Coordinates: 47°27′45″N 121°38′22″W

Geography
- Location within Washington (state) Location within the United States
- Country: United States
- State: Washington
- County: King
- Parent range: Cascade Range
- Topo map: USGS Chester Morse Lake

Climbing
- Easiest route: class 1+ hiking trail

Mailbox Peak is a 4,841-foot-elevation (1,476 m) mountain located in King County of Washington state. It is set west of the crest of the Cascade Range, on land managed by Mount Baker-Snoqualmie National Forest. Mailbox Peak is situated seven miles east of North Bend, and one mile northeast above the Washington State Fire Training Academy. Precipitation runoff from the south side of the mountain drains into the South Fork Snoqualmie River, whereas the north side drains to the Middle Fork of the Snoqualmie. The summit lies along a ridge containing Dirtybox Peak, its topographical parent, and Dirty Harry's Peak. Topographic relief is significant as the northwest aspect rises nearly 4,100 feet (1,200 meters) above the Middle Fork in 1.25 mile. The popular Mailbox Peak Trail gains 4,100 feet of elevation over 5.5 miles. Prior to 2014 when the new trail was completed, climbing Mailbox Peak involved 4,000 feet gain in only 2.6 miles along an unmaintained route that was used for conditioning for major climbs, and recruits from the Fire Training Academy would celebrate graduation by carrying a fire hydrant to the summit. The peak is named for a mailbox at the top which functions as the summit register, but this toponym has not been officially adopted by the U.S. Board on Geographic Names.

The mountain is one of the most popular locations for search and rescue calls to King County Search and Rescue, accounting for nine calls in the first six months of 2020. In 2025, KCSAR received five calls in only one week. According to the group, most calls are for "dehydration, leg cramps, falls, or people getting lost after dark".

== Climate ==
Mailbox Peak is located in the marine west coast climate zone of western North America. Most weather fronts originate in the Pacific Ocean, and travel northeast toward the Cascade Mountains. As fronts approach, they are forced upward by the peaks of the Cascade Range, causing them to drop their moisture in the form of rain or snowfall onto the Cascades (Orographic lift). As a result, the west side of the Cascades experiences high precipitation, especially during the winter months in the form of snowfall. Because of maritime influence, snow tends to be wet and heavy, resulting in high avalanche danger. During winter months, weather is usually cloudy, but due to high pressure systems over the Pacific Ocean that intensify during summer months, there is often little or no cloud cover during the summer. The months May through October offer the most favorable weather for viewing or climbing this peak.

== Gallery ==
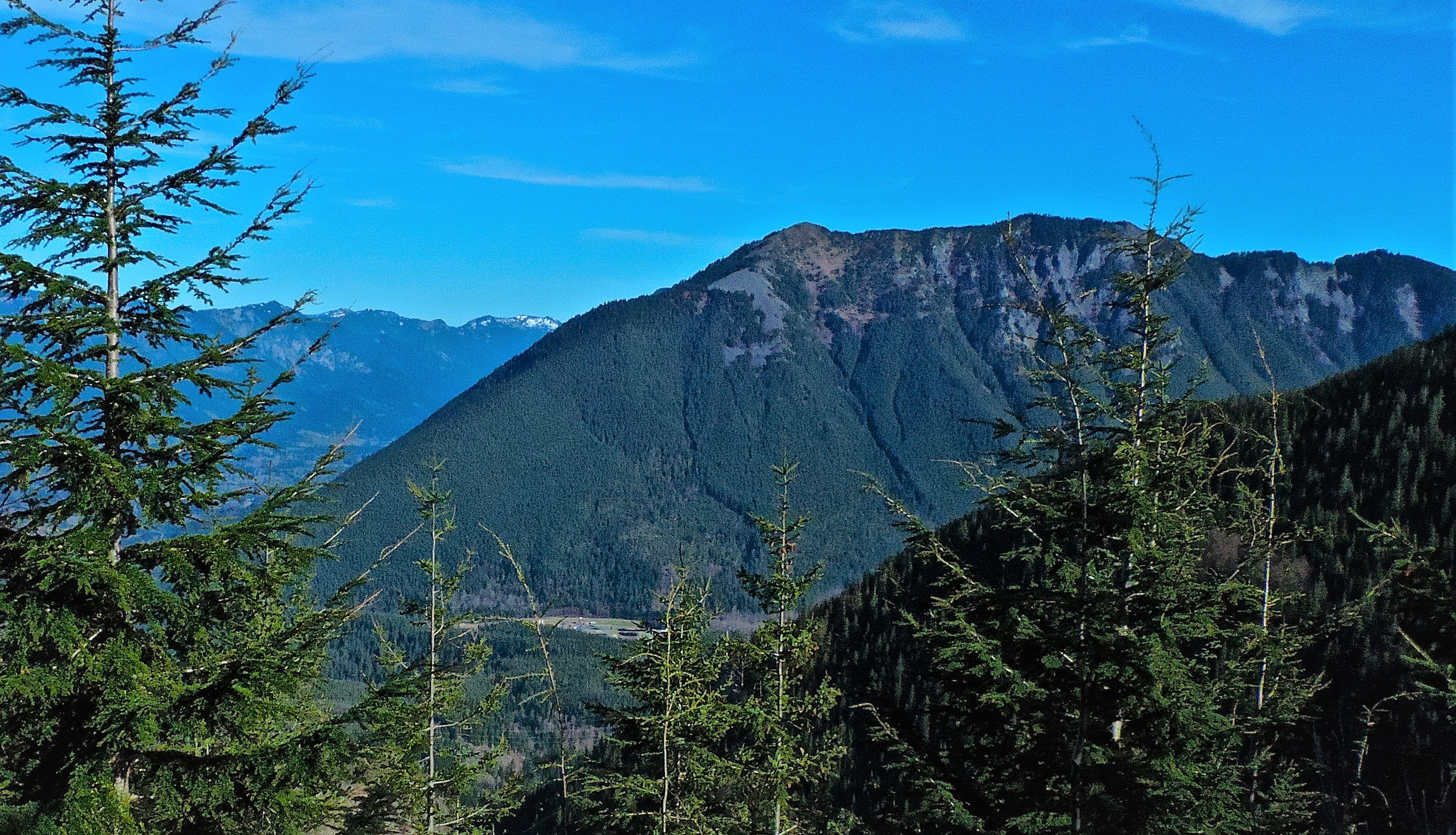
Southwest aspect of Mailbox and Dirty Harry's Peak, from Mt. Washington

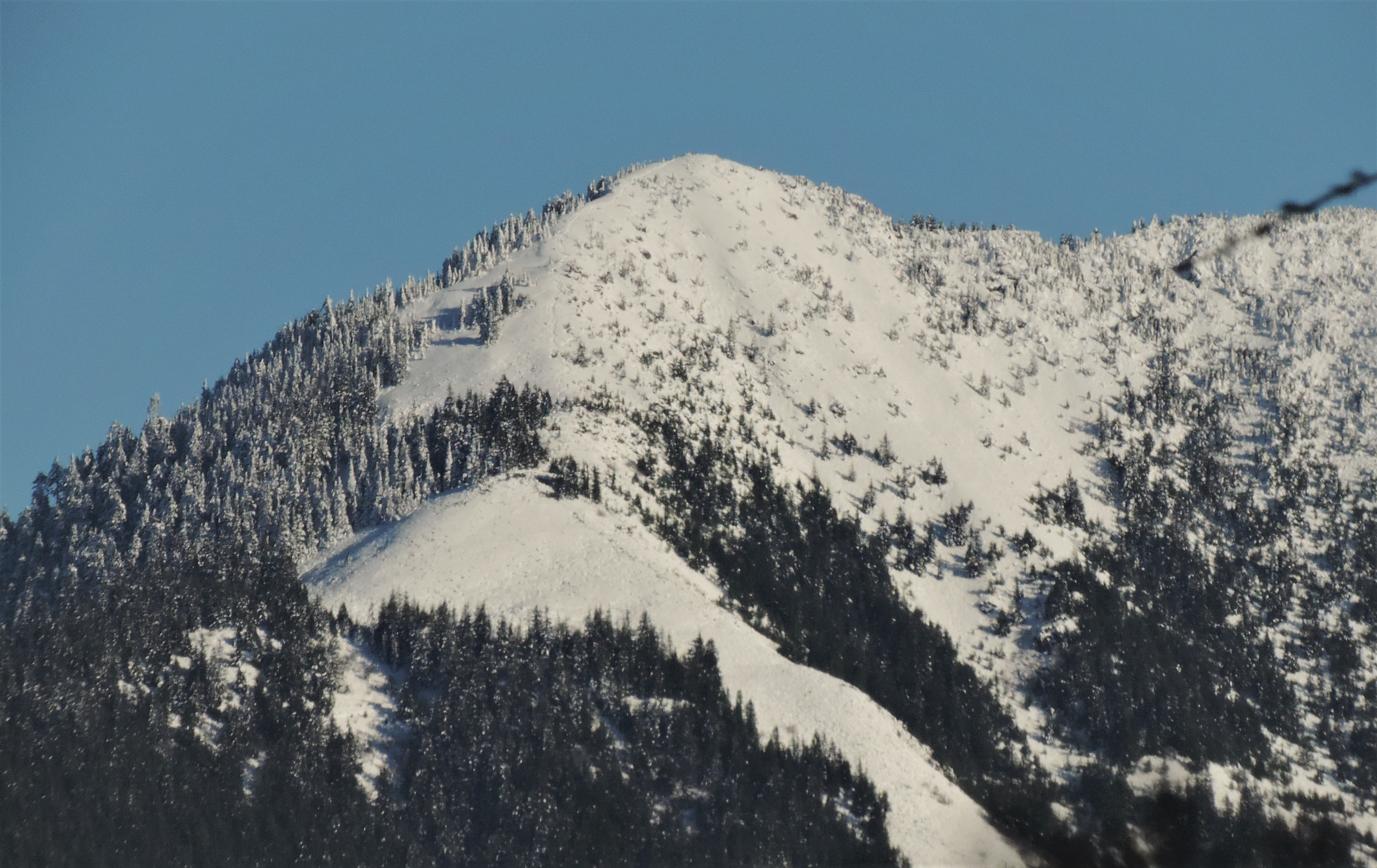
Southwest aspect, from Cedar Butte

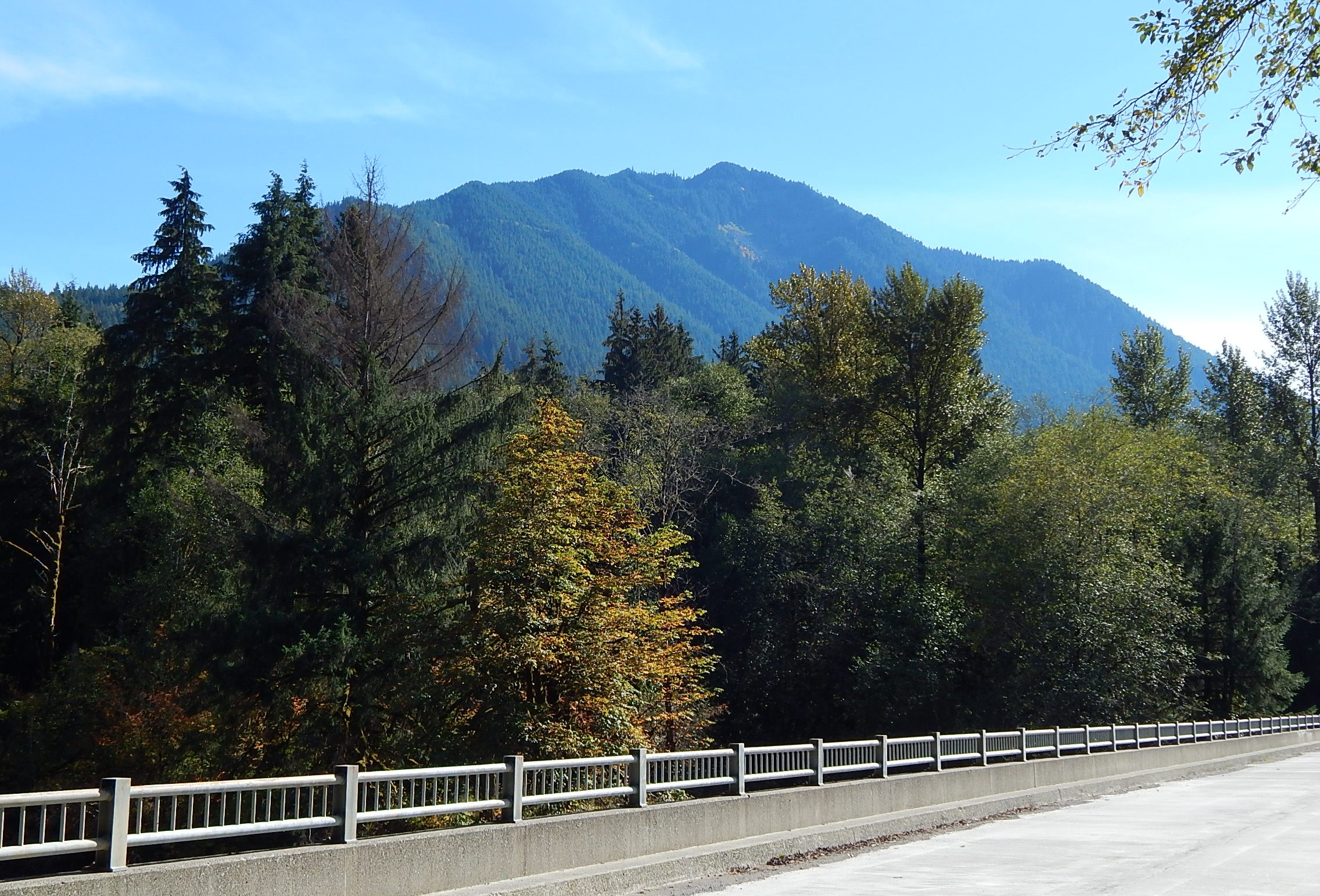
North aspect, from Middle Fork Snoqualmie River Road

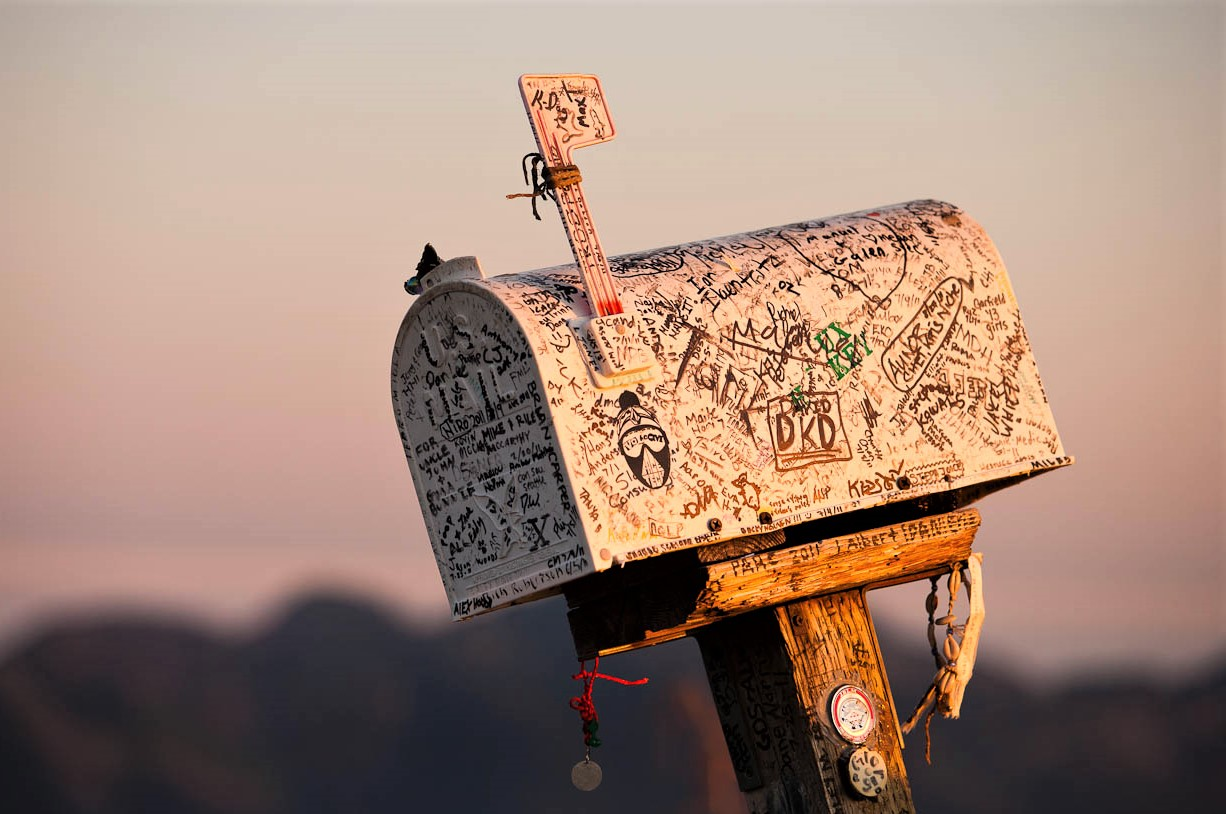
The summit mailbox

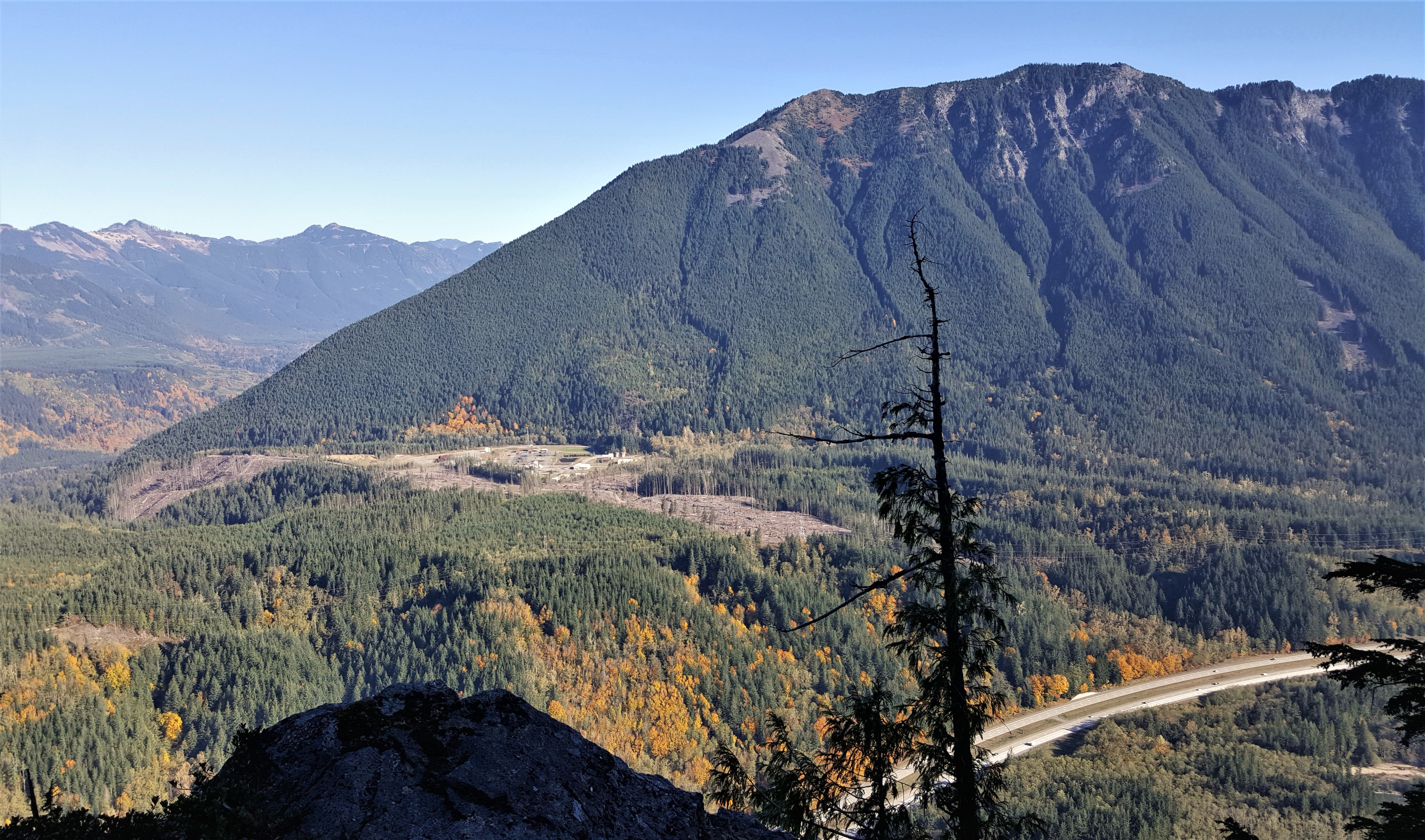
Mailbox Peak, seen from Salal Point. Washington State Fire Training Academy at the foot of the mountain. Interstate 90 in lower right. Moolock Mountain in the distance to left. Dirty Harry's Peak on the right side of the ridge.

== See also ==
- Geology of the Pacific Northwest
- Dirty Harry's Peak
