= Green Mountain (King County, Washington) =

Mountain in America

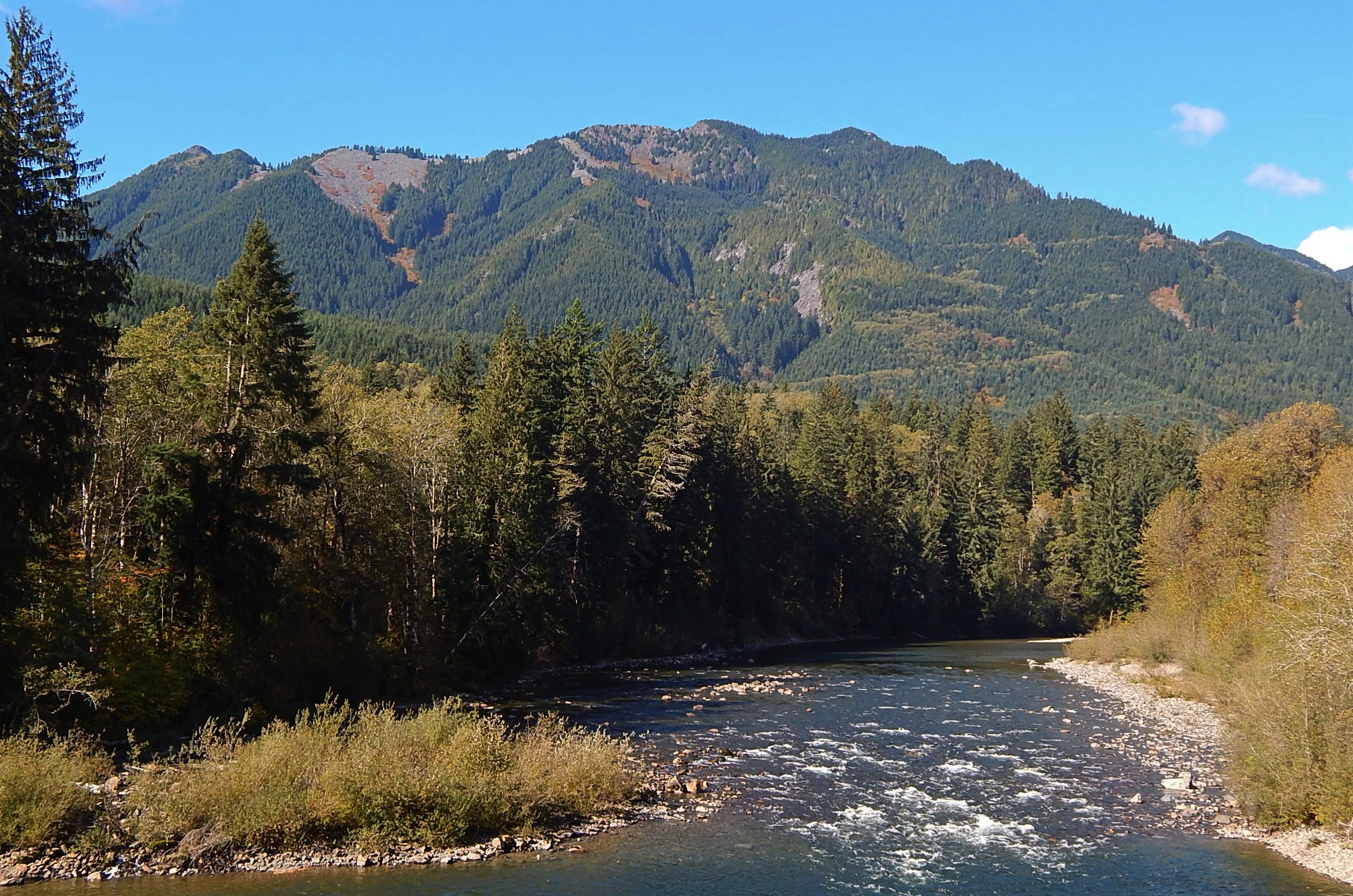
- Green Mountain with Middle Fork Snoqualmie River

Highest point
- Elevation: 4,824 ft (1,470 m)
- Prominence: 464 ft (141 m)
- Parent peak: Moolock Mountain (4,965 ft)
- Isolation: 2.53 mi (4.07 km)
- Coordinates: 47°31′03″N 121°40′25″W

Geography
- Location within Washington (state) Location within the United States
- Location: King County, Washington state, U.S.
- Parent range: Cascade Range
- Topo map: USGS Mount Si

Climbing
- Easiest route: Scrambling

Green Mountain is a 4,824-foot (1,470-metre) mountain summit located in King County of Washington state. It's situated at the western edge of the Cascade Range on land managed by Mount Baker-Snoqualmie National Forest. Green Mountain is more notable for its large, steep rise above local terrain than for its absolute elevation. Its nearest neighbor is Mount Teneriffe, 1.18 miles (1.90 km) to the southwest, and the nearest higher peak is Moolock Mountain, 2.53 miles (4.07 km) to the northeast. Precipitation runoff from Green Mountain drains into tributaries of the Snoqualmie River.

== Climate ==
Green Mountain is located in the marine west coast climate zone of western North America. Most weather fronts originate in the Pacific Ocean, and travel northeast toward the Cascade Mountains. As fronts approach, they are forced upward by the peaks of the Cascade Range, causing them to drop their moisture in the form of rain or snowfall onto the Cascades (Orographic lift). As a result, the west side of the Cascades experiences high precipitation, especially during the winter months in the form of snowfall. During winter months, weather is usually cloudy, but, due to high pressure systems over the Pacific Ocean that intensify during summer months, there is often little or no cloud cover during the summer. Because of maritime influence, snow tends to be wet and heavy, resulting in avalanche danger.

== Geology ==
The history of the formation of the Cascade Mountains dates back millions of years ago to the late Eocene Epoch. During the Pleistocene period dating back over two million years ago, glaciation advancing and retreating repeatedly scoured the landscape leaving deposits of rock debris. The last glacial retreat in the area began about 14,000 years ago and was north of the Canada–US border by 10,000 years ago. The U-shaped cross section of the river valleys is a result of that recent glaciation. Uplift and faulting in combination with glaciation have been the dominant processes which have created the tall peaks and deep valleys of the Cascade Range.

== See also ==
- Geology of the Pacific Northwest
- Geography of Washington (state)
