= Bessemer Mountain =

Mountain in Washington (state), United States

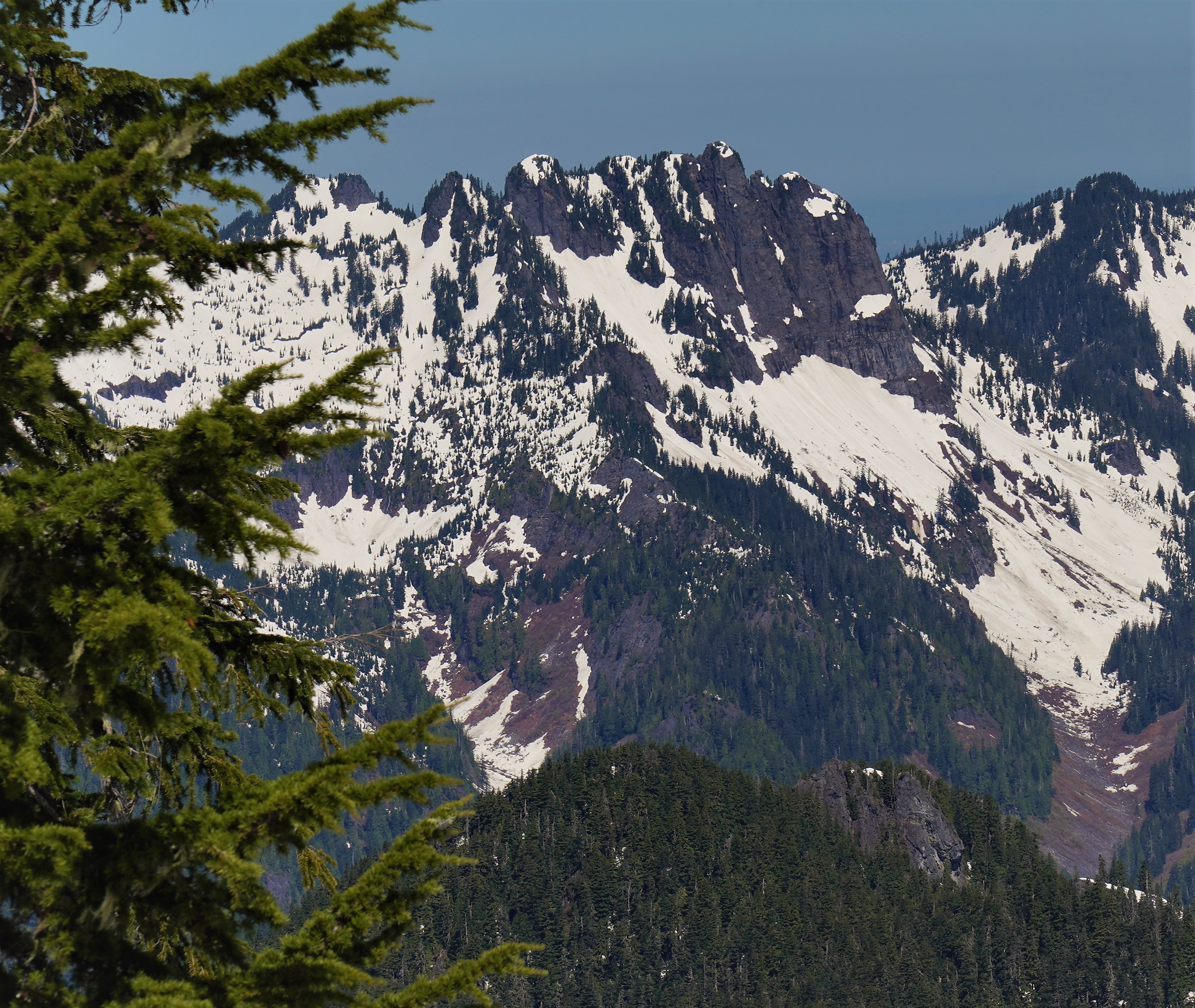
- Southeast aspect, from Preacher Mountain

Highest point
- Elevation: 5,166 ft (1,575 m)
- Prominence: 1,446 ft (441 m)
- Parent peak: Boomerang Peak (5,185 ft)
- Isolation: 2.57 mi (4.14 km)
- Coordinates: 47°33′31″N 121°36′35″W

Geography
- Location within Washington (state) Location within the United States
- Country: United States
- State: Washington
- County: King
- Parent range: Cascade Range
- Topo map: USGS Lake Philippa

Bessemer Mountain is a 5,166-foot-elevation (1,575-meter) mountain summit located in King County of Washington state. It is situated at the western edge of the Cascade Range, on land managed by Mount Baker-Snoqualmie National Forest. Bessemer Mountain is more notable for its large, steep rise above local terrain than for its absolute elevation. Topographic relief is significant as the south aspect rises over 4,200 feet (1,300 meters) above Middle Fork Snoqualmie River in two miles. Precipitation runoff from this mountain drains into tributaries of the Snoqualmie River.

== Climate ==
Bessemer Mountain is located in the marine west coast climate zone of western North America. Weather fronts originating in the Pacific Ocean travel northeast toward the Cascade Mountains. As fronts approach, they are forced upward by the peaks of the Cascade Range, causing them to drop their moisture in the form of rain or snow onto the Cascades (Orographic lift). As a result, the west side of the Cascades experiences high precipitation, especially during the winter months in the form of snowfall. Because of maritime influence, snow tends to be wet and heavy, resulting in avalanche danger. During winter months, weather is usually cloudy, but due to high pressure systems over the Pacific Ocean that intensify during summer months, there is often little or no cloud cover during the summer.

== Geology ==
The history of the formation of the Cascade Mountains dates back millions of years ago to the late Eocene Epoch. During the Pleistocene period dating back over two million years ago, glaciation advancing and retreating repeatedly scoured the landscape leaving deposits of rock debris. The last glacial retreat in the area began about 14,000 years ago and was north of the Canada–US border by 10,000 years ago. The U-shaped cross section of the river valleys is a result of that recent glaciation. Uplift and faulting in combination with glaciation have been the dominant processes which have created the tall peaks and deep valleys of the Cascade Range.

== Gallery ==
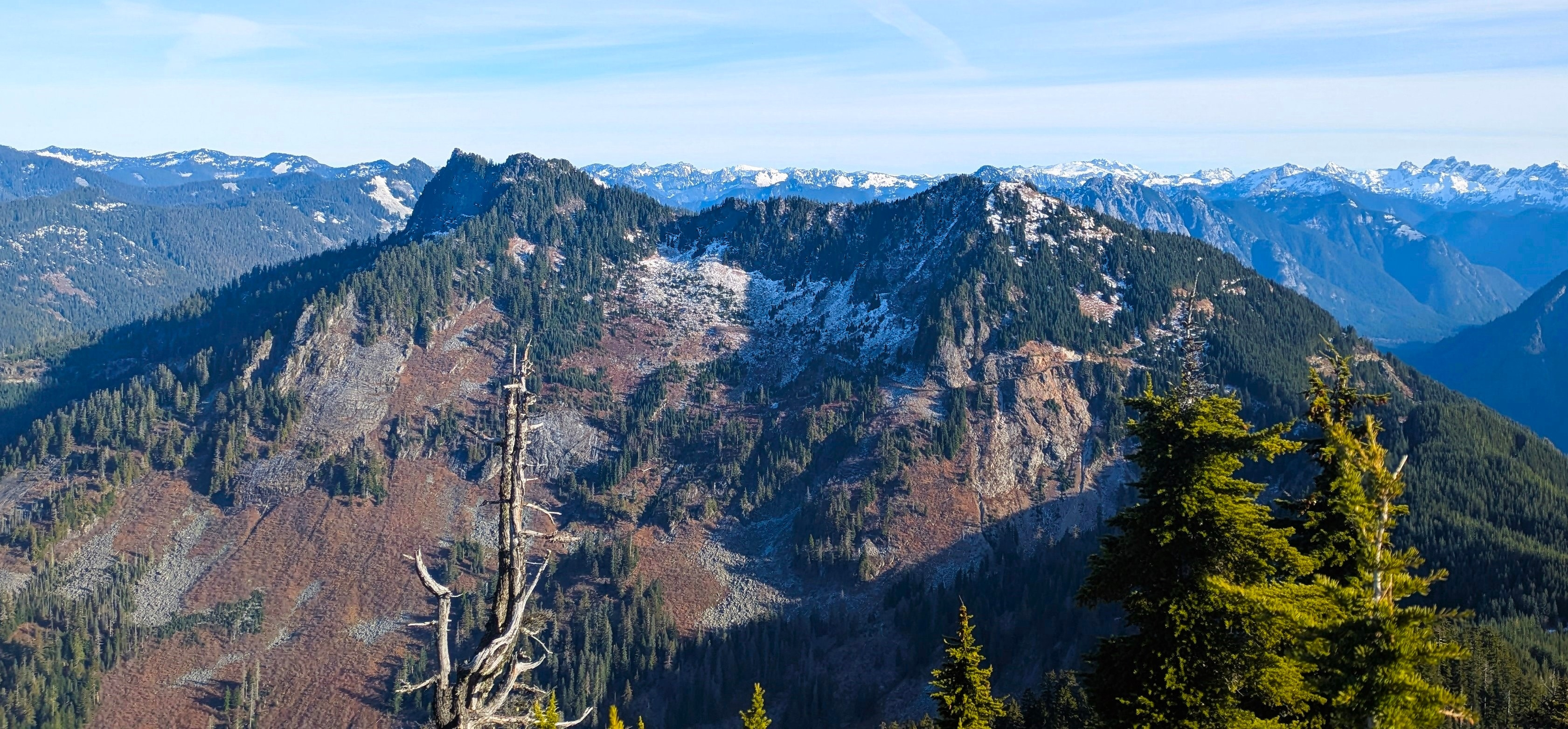
West aspect, viewed from Moolock Mountain

== See also ==
- Geology of the Pacific Northwest
- Moolock Mountain
