= Montes Recti =

Mountain range on the Moon

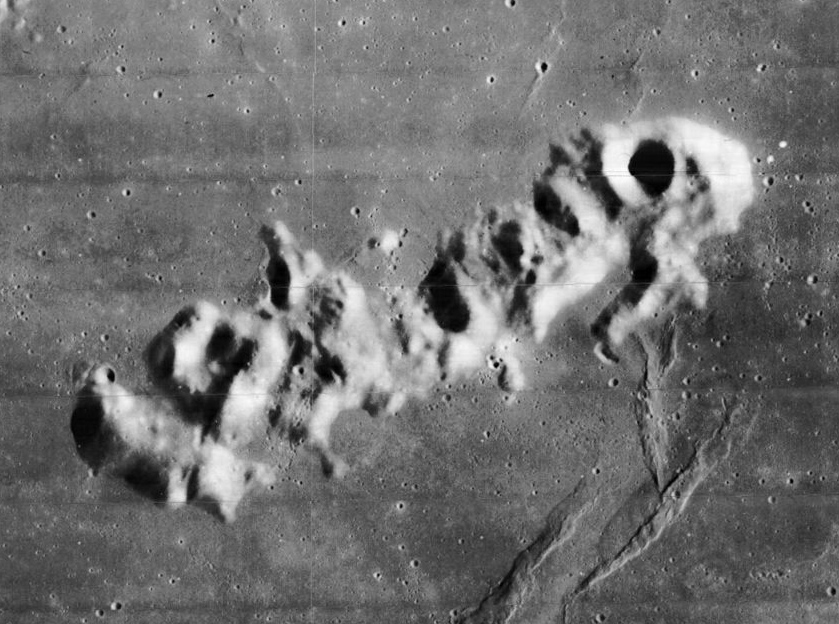
- Lunar Orbiter 4 image

Highest point
- Elevation: 1.8 km
- Listing: Lunar mountains
- Coordinates: 48.0°N 20.0°W

Naming
- English translation: Straight Range
- Language of name: Latin

Geography
- Location: the Moon

Montes Recti is a mountain range on the northern part of the Moon's near side. It was given the Latin name for "Straight Range". The name was approved in 1961 by the International Astronomical Union (IAU).

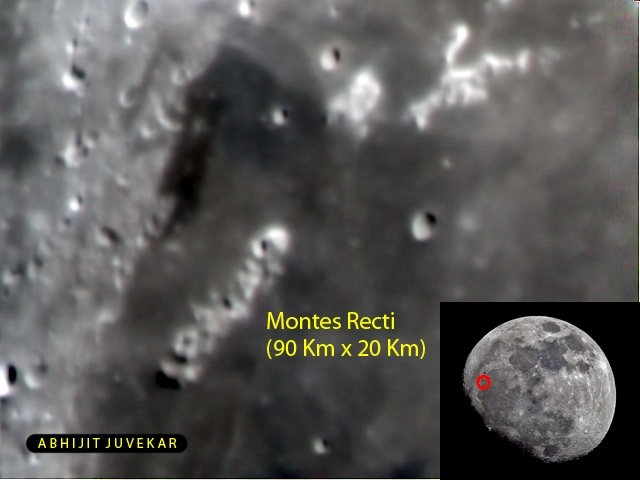
Montes Recti

This is a small range of irregular ridges that is located in the northern part of the Mare Imbrium. Montes Recti is an unusually linear formation that forms a line from east to west. It is about 90 km in length, and only 20 km wide. The peaks rise to heights of up to 1.8 km.

The small crater Montes Recti B lies in the eastern part of the range. To the west are the Montes Jura and to the east are the Montes Teneriffe.
