= Moolock Mountain =

Mountain in Washington (state), United States

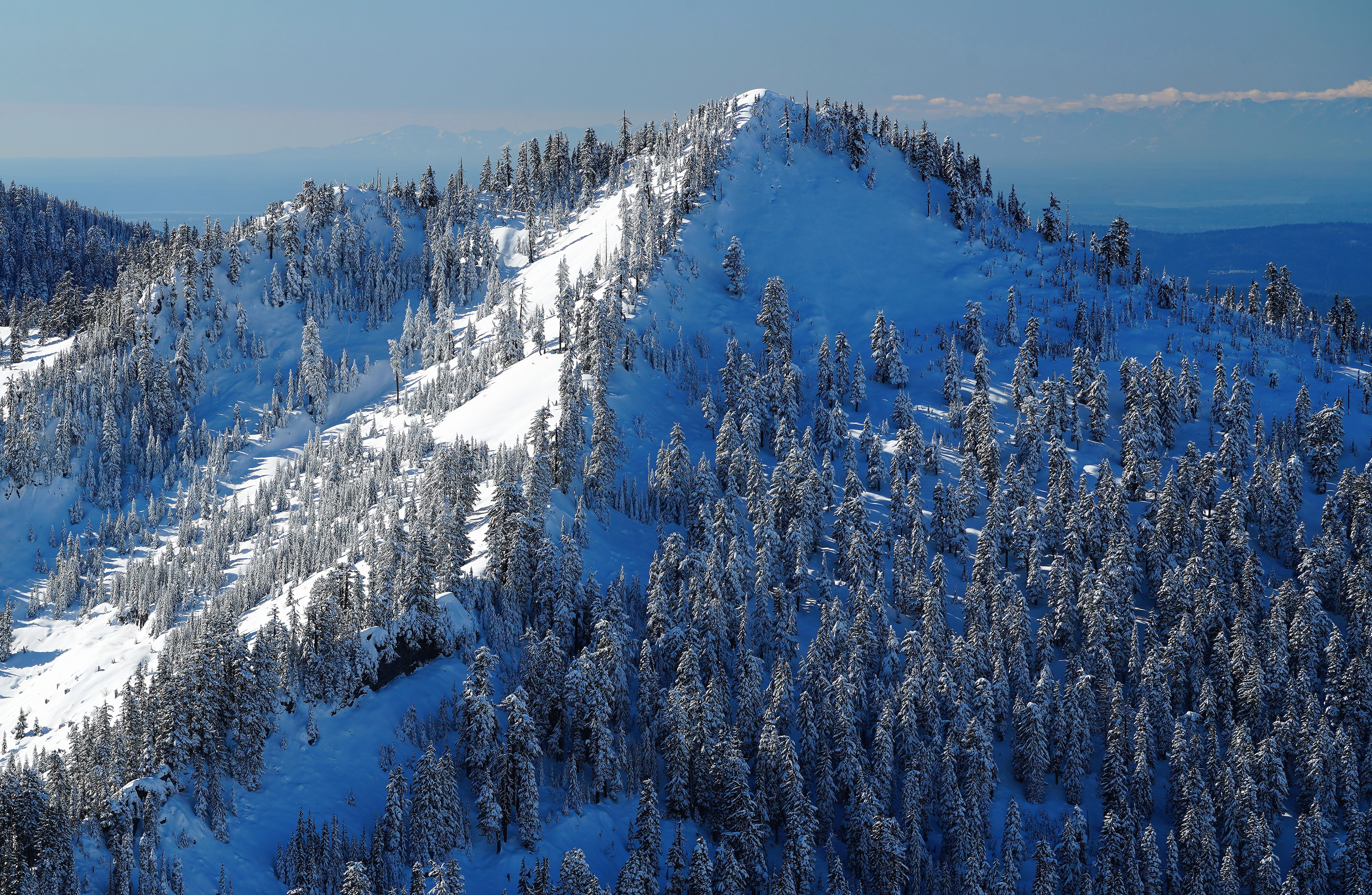
- East aspect, seen from South Bessemer Mountain

Highest point
- Elevation: 4,965 ft (1,513 m)
- Prominence: 925 ft (282 m)
- Parent peak: Bessemer Mountain (5,166 ft)
- Isolation: 1.81 mi (2.91 km)
- Coordinates: 47°32′51″N 121°38′31″W

Geography
- Location within Washington (state) Location within the United States
- Country: United States
- State: Washington
- County: King
- Parent range: Cascade Range
- Topo map: USGS Mount Si

Climbing
- Easiest route: hiking

Moolock Mountain is a 4,965-foot-elevation (1,513-meter) summit located in King County of Washington state. It is situated at the western edge of the Cascade Range, on land managed by Mount Baker-Snoqualmie National Forest. Moolock Mountain is more notable for its large, steep rise above local terrain than for its absolute elevation. The nearest higher neighbor is line parent Bessemer Mountain, 1.8 mi (2.9 km) to the northeast, and Green Mountain is 2.5 miles to the southwest. Precipitation runoff from this mountain drains into tributaries of the North and Middle Forks of the Snoqualmie River. This unofficially named peak rises immediately southeast above Lake Moolock, which is officially named. Moolock, or moolack, is a Chinook Jargon word meaning "elk."

== Climate ==
Moolock Mountain is located in the marine west coast climate zone of western North America. Most weather fronts originate in the Pacific Ocean, and travel east toward the Cascade Mountains. As fronts approach, they are forced upward by the peaks of the Cascade Range, causing them to drop their moisture in the form of rain or snowfall onto the Cascades (Orographic lift). As a result, the west side of the Cascades experiences high precipitation, especially during the winter months in the form of snowfall. Because of maritime influence, snow tends to be wet and heavy, resulting in avalanche danger. During winter months, weather is usually cloudy, but due to high pressure systems over the Pacific Ocean that intensify during summer months, there is often little or no cloud cover during the summer.

== Geology ==
The history of the formation of the Cascade Mountains dates back millions of years ago to the late Eocene Epoch. During the Pleistocene period dating back over two million years ago, glaciation advancing and retreating repeatedly scoured the landscape leaving deposits of rock debris. The last glacial retreat in the area began about 14,000 years ago and was north of the Canada–US border by 10,000 years ago. The U-shaped cross section of the river valleys is a result of that recent glaciation. Uplift and faulting in combination with glaciation have been the dominant processes which have created the tall peaks and deep valleys of the Cascade Range.

== Gallery ==
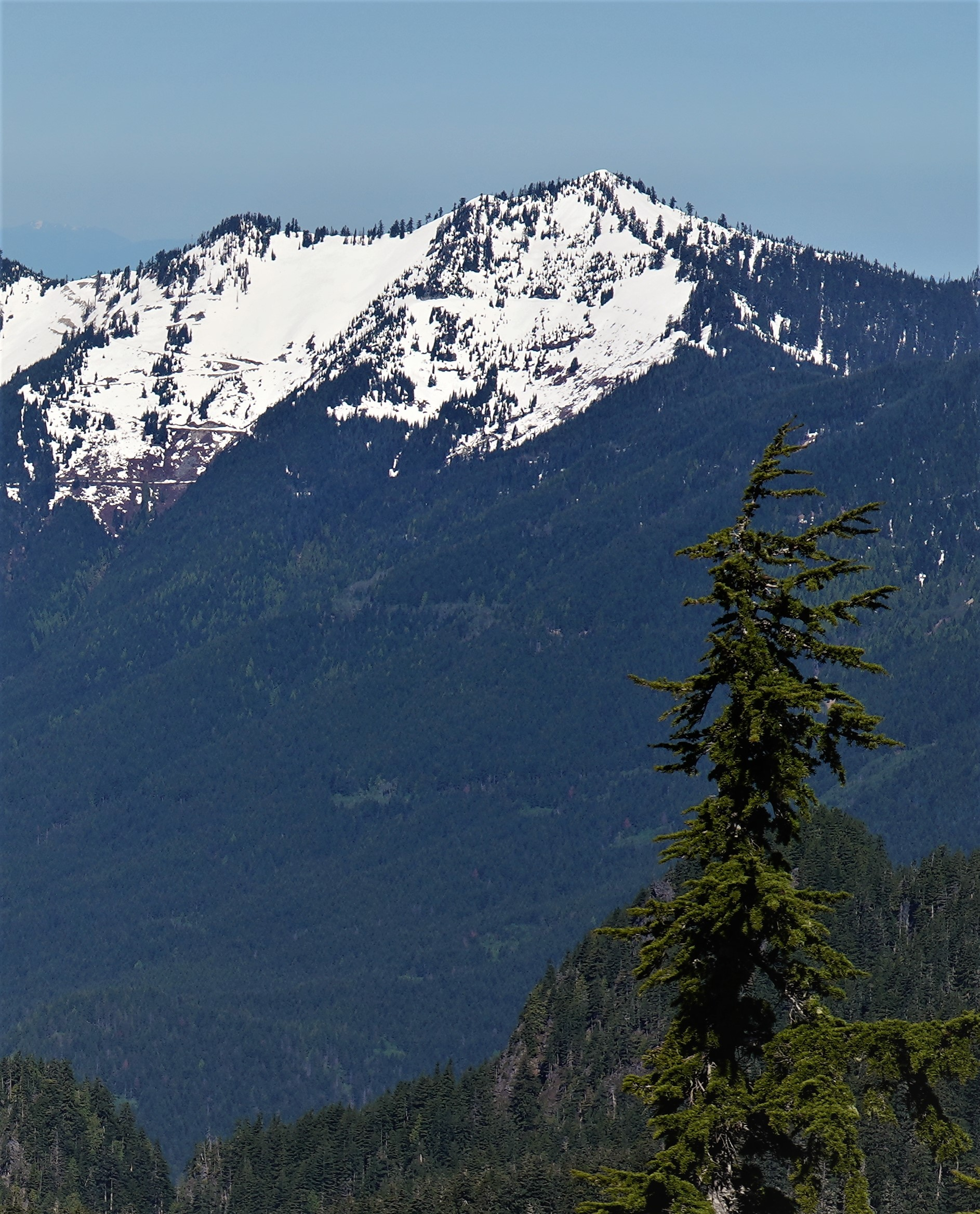
Southeast aspect, seen from Preacher Mountain

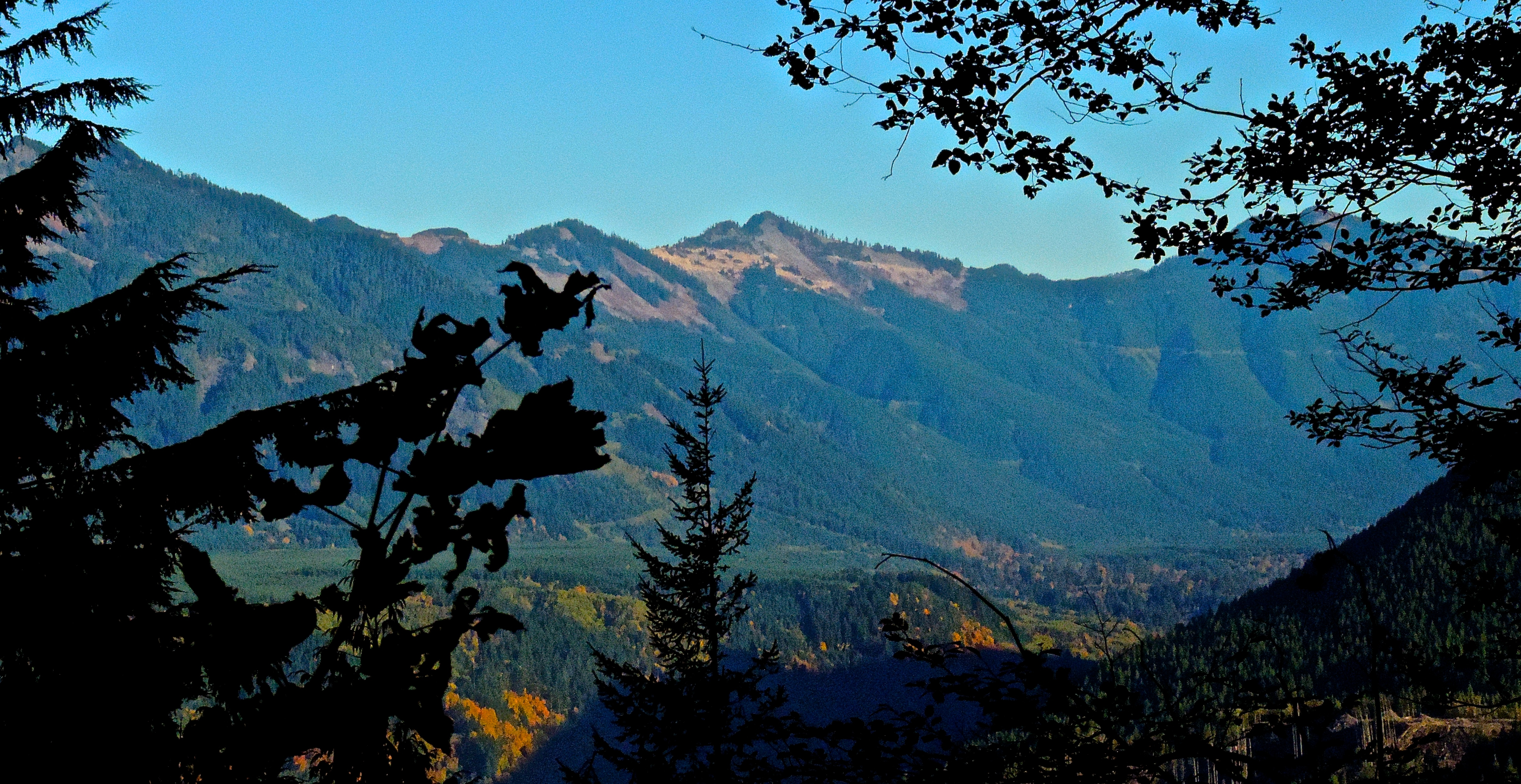
Moolock centered

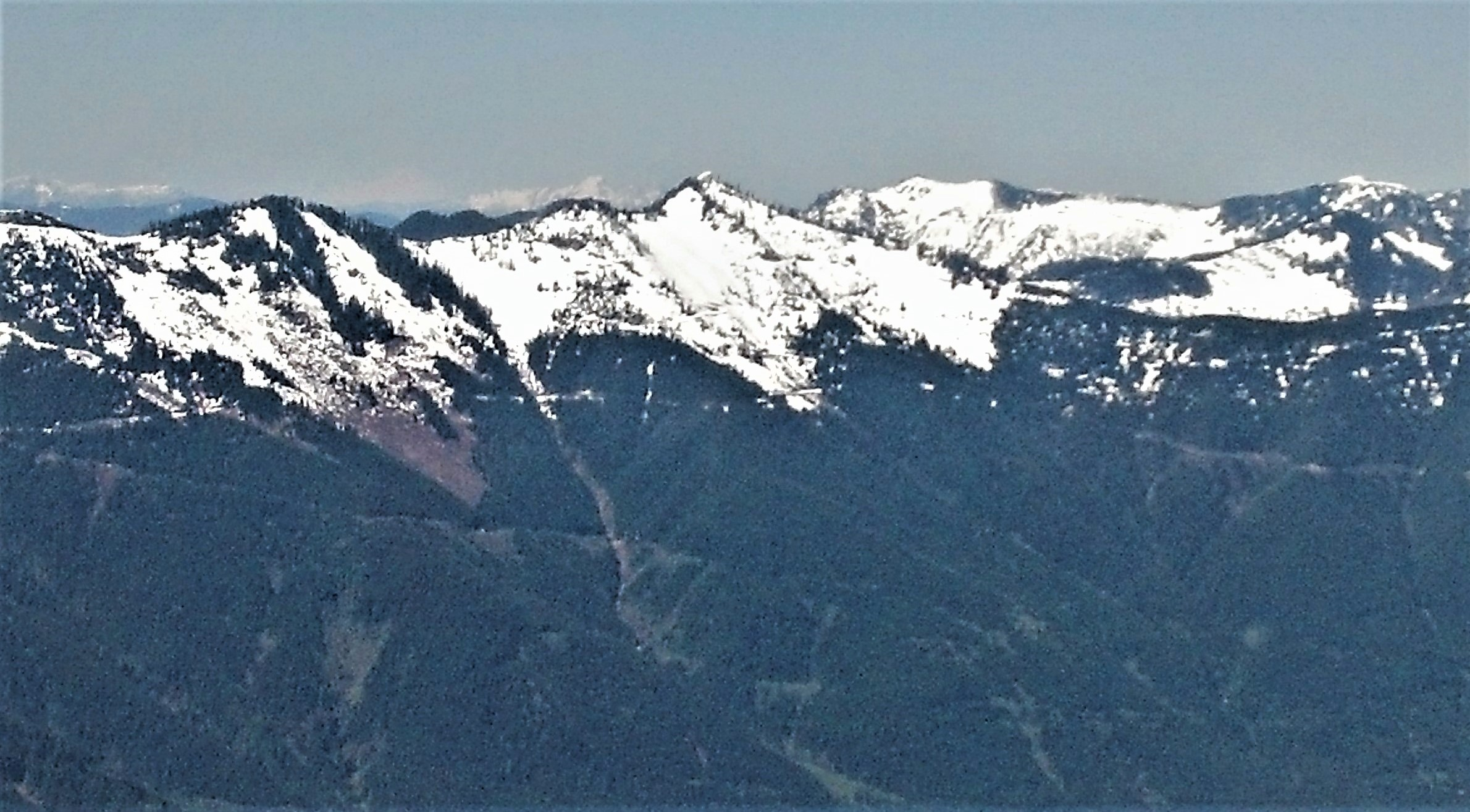
South aspect of Moolock Mountain (centered), seen from Mailbox Peak.

== See also ==
- Geology of the Pacific Northwest
