= Mobile field force =

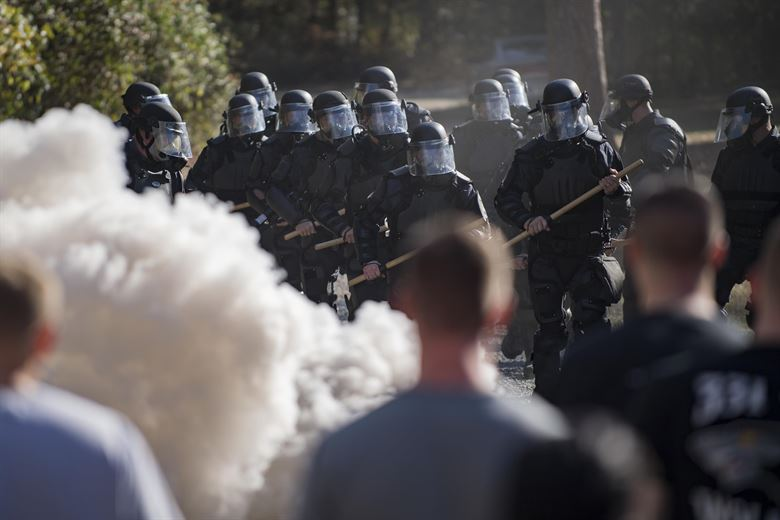
An element of the Georgia State Patrol Mobile Field Force pictured in 2016

A mobile field force (MFF), within the context of United States law enforcement, is a large element of police officers specially organized to support anti-riot operations through the use of maneuver tactics aimed at dispersing crowds during their embryonic phase or extracting agitators and leaders from larger groups. The mobile field force concept was created by the Miami-Dade Police Department in the 1980s.

== History ==
The mobile field force concept originated with the Miami-Dade Police Department in the 1980s.

Use of the mobile field force concept gained popularity among police departments due to the realization that traditional riot control tactics involving large echelons of police recapturing entire streets from protesters only served to move the unrest from one area to the next. By contrast, the mobile field force is a smaller group of police which identifies agitators and leaders of the crowd and targets them for extraction from the main group, or confronts and disperses a crowd during its embryonic phase.

== Role and organization ==
The mobile field force is either a dedicated group of law enforcement officers, or a group of law enforcement officers with non-MFF duties who can be rapidly mobilized into the mobile field force in anticipation of an exigent event. Its primary responsibility is to operate in support of an agency's regular police during periods of civil unrest by disrupting and dispersing crowds that are in the process of forming, or identifying and arresting leaders of crowds that have already formed. In addition, the mobile field force can be used for protection of large crime scenes, saturation patrols in high-crime neighborhoods, or to provide security at critical infrastructure during periods of heightened threat; for instance, in Illinois, the Illinois Law Enforcement Alarm System (ILEAS) Mobile Field Forces prepare to defend Strategic National Stockpile distribution sites during a pandemic.

Mobile field forces typically have between 27 and 57 personnel. U.S. Department of Homeland Security standards expect mobile field forces to be self-sufficient for periods of up to 72 hours.

A sample 33-officer mobile field force is organized as a platoon, consisting of four 8-officer squads. An MFF squad includes one grenadier who is responsible for deploying riot control agents and other less-lethal munitions using a riot gun. An 8-officer squad uses two marked patrol vehicles for mobility. A platoon is usually accompanied by multiple prisoner transport vehicles.

== See also ==
- Bereitschaftspolizei
- Territorial Support Group
- Units for the Reinstatement of Order
