= Washington State Fire Training Academy =

Firefighting training academy in North Bend, Washington, United States

- Type: Firefighting academy
- Established: 1984
- Parent institution: Washington State Patrol
- Commander: Kelly Merz
- Location: 50810 Southeast Grouse Ridge Road; North Bend, Washington, U.S. 47°27′14″N 121°39′41″W
- Campus: Rural, 51 acres (21 ha)
- Website: wsp.wa.gov

The Washington State Fire Training Academy is a firefighting training center near North Bend, Washington, United States. It is operated by the Washington State Patrol and includes classrooms, dormitories, and several simulation centers. The facility opened in 1984.

== History ==
The King County government began planning for a centralized fire training academy in 1961, citing a need for standardized simulation for the city-level and rural fire departments in the region. Prior to establishing a centralized academy, Washington firefighters took specialized courses at community colleges or those run by the Washington State Board for Vocational Education of Firemen with part-time instructors. State funding for the fire training academy was authorized in 1978 by Governor Dixy Lee Ray under the direction of the Washington State Commission for Vocational Education, with $4.3 million in bonds allocated for the first two of three phases.

A county-owned gravel pit on 35 acres (14 ha) near Enumclaw and Flaming Geyser State Park was proposed as the site of the fire training academy in 1979, beating ten other sites. It had been abandoned since 1963 and used as a dirtbike course and unauthorized landfill by local residents, who voiced their opposition to the project and its potential impact on air quality. In December 1979, the King County government denied a conditional-use construction permit for the project after a series of public hearings that attracted hundreds of protesting Enumclaw residents. The denied permit was appealed by the state government, but the ruling was upheld by the county zoning examiner; the state government announced in March 1980 that it would seek another site.

In June 1980, the Washington State Commission for Vocational Education announced its choice of a gravel pit on 100 acres (40 ha) approximately 8 miles (13 km) east of North Bend as its preferred location for the academy. The gravel pit was abandoned after its use in the construction of Interstate 90 and its ownership was divided between the state government and Weyerhaeuser. The North Bend site, later reduced to 50 acres (20 ha), was deemed ideal because of its isolation from nearby residents and accessibility via Interstate 90. The King County Council approved construction of the fire training academy in North Bend in January 1982 and work began in April 1983. An official groundbreaking ceremony was held on July 20, 1983, with county and local officials joined by Governor John Spellman.

The fire training center was opened with a dedication ceremony on August 11, 1984, with Governor Spellman and other state officials in attendance to watch demonstrations of the simulator facilities. The center cost $7 million to construct and was expanded to include additional facilities, including a mock-up of a small ship named the "SS Unsinkable". The remainder of the state-owned land on the North Bend site was proposed for a state prison that would house inmates trained for wildfire response, in the late 1980s. The proposal was later withdrawn after protests from North Bend residents.

A year after opening, the training academy was stripped of its federal funding due to cuts in vocational funding approved by President Ronald Reagan in October 1984. The academy's operating funds were temporarily backfilled by the state general fund, but it was reduced to half their original amount. As a result, higher tuition fees were instituted and caused enrollment to decline by 40 to 50 percent, and the academy grounds were turned over for partial commercial use. An airport firefighting center was built adjacent to the original fire training academy, opening in November 1998 after it was relocated from Seattle–Tacoma International Airport.

On February 5, 2020, the fire training center was designated by the state government as a quarantine site for asymptomatic travelers from Hubei Province, China, during the COVID-19 pandemic. It is set to be the only quarantine site in Washington, joining four military bases in other states. The Washington State Public Health Laboratory in Shoreline was also chosen as a quarantine site for most travelers while the fire training center will house those needing accessible accommodation. The academy remained open for lessons, with students relocated to a motel in North Bend. A few weeks after the initial announcement, the Washington State Department of Health announced that the fire training academy would no longer be used as a quarantine site and allowed firefighters to return to their dormitories.

== Facilities ==
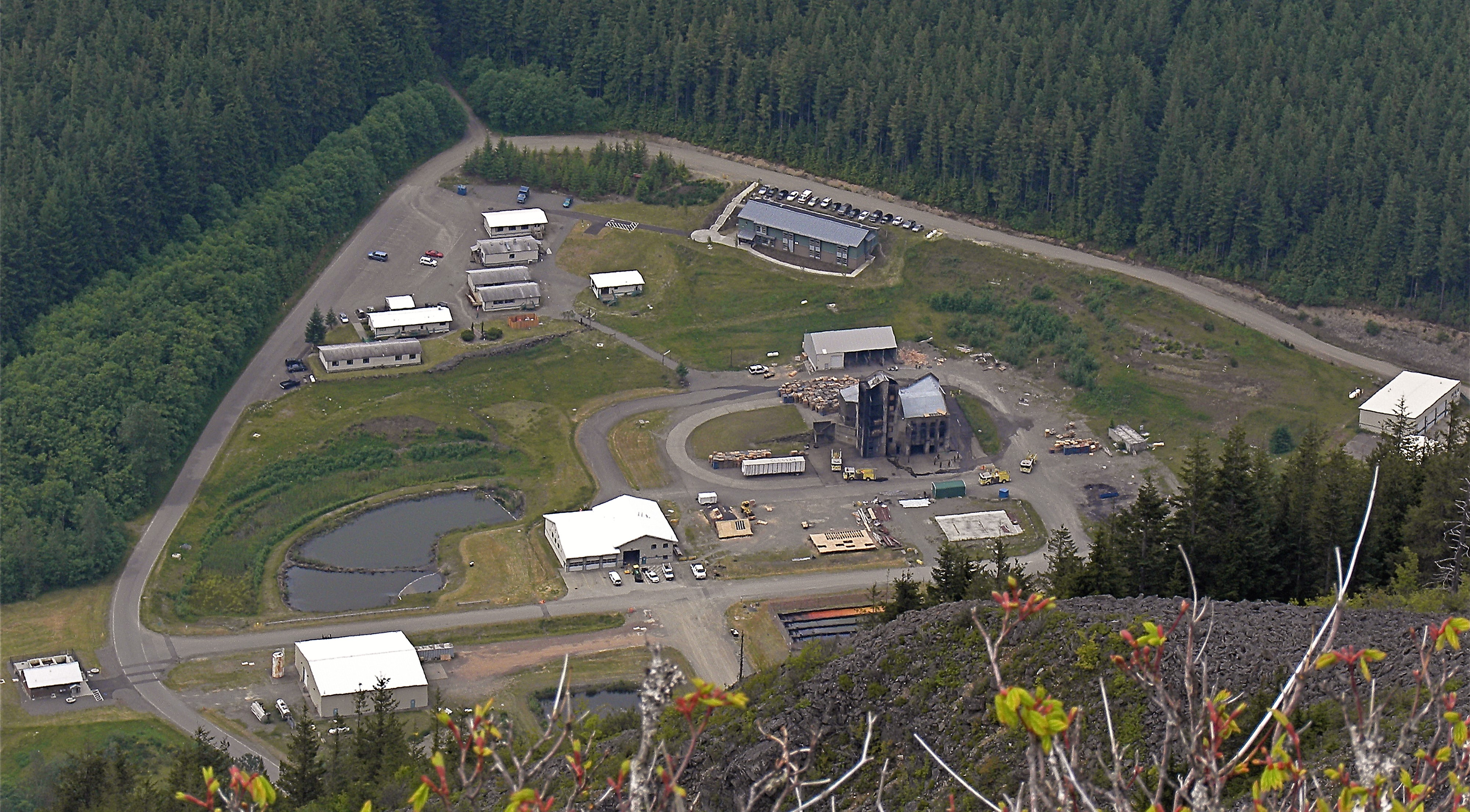
Washington State Fire Training Academy seen from slopes of Mailbox Peak

The fire training academy is on a 51-acre (21 ha) campus that consists of four classrooms, a two-story dormitory with 20 rooms, and training areas. The largest training area is a six-story "burn building", which was originally used for live fire training, later being converted for use in search and rescue training after a new live fire training structure was added. The center has seven concrete burn pads that use flammable liquids to ignite and intensify fires around objects to simulate fires involving gas tankers, airplanes, ships, and other vehicles. The facility is certified to use jet fuel, diesel fuel, and gasoline in exercises on the burn pads, which are collected for treatment and reuse. The state Fallen Firefighter Memorial is located at the academy and is marked with a bronze Maltese cross on a granite cairn.

The training academy has three courses per year, each running for 12 weeks, that include a military-style boot camp and coursework for certifications. The course requires tuition and other fees, which are the main revenue source for the academy. Since 2001, the training academy has also hosted "Camp Blaze", a week-long firefighting course for teenage girls who are instructed by female professional firefighters.
