= Pico de Tenerife =

- Location within Canary Islands

Highest point
- Elevation: 1,253 m (4,111 ft)
- Prominence: 1,253 m (4,111 ft)

Geography
- Location: El Hierro, Spain

The Pico de Tenerife is 1,253 meters, the second highest altitude of the island of El Hierro, Canary Islands, Spain, after the Pico de Malpaso with 1,501 meters in height.

== See also ==
- El Hierro
