= Tokyo Chemical Industry =

Chemical manufacturer

- Logo
- Type: Private
- Industry: Research chemicals, bulk chemicals, custom synthesis
- Headquarters: Tokyo, Japan
- Website: https://www.tcichemicals.com/

Tokyo Chemical Industry Co., Ltd. (TCI) is a Japanese manufacturer of research chemicals, headquartered in Tokyo, Japan. Established in 1894, the company specializes in chemical reagents and also provides custom synthesis and bulk chemical production services. TCI operates internationally, with subsidiaries and manufacturing facilities across Asia, Europe, and North America.

Its products are used in a range of scientific disciplines, including academic research, pharmaceuticals, materials science, and life sciences.

== History ==
Tokyo Chemical Industry was originally founded as Asakawa Shoten in 1894 by Kobei Asakawa, a pharmaceutical wholesaler based in Tokyo. In 1946, the company was renamed Tokyo Kasei Kogyo Co., Ltd. and began specializing in the manufacture of organic research chemicals.

In 1966, a production facility was opened in Fukaya, Japan. The company expanded internationally in 1985 with the establishment of American Tokyo Kasei Inc. (now TCI America) in Portland, Oregon. TCI Europe N.V. was established in Antwerp, Belgium, in 1999.

In 2002, a distribution center in Kawaguchi, Japan was opened. TCI (Shanghai) Co., Ltd. in Shanghai, China was established in the same year. In 2005, TCI (Shanghai) Development Co., Ltd. was formed.

The company changed its English name to Tokyo Chemical Industry Co., Ltd. in 2006. That year, TCI Deutschland GmbH was established in Frankfurt, Germany. In 2007, TCI United Kingdom Ltd. was established in Oxford.

In 2008, TCI Chemicals (India) Pvt. Ltd. was established in Chennai. A branch office was opened in Beijing in 2011. That year, new offices were also opened in Pudong and Tianjin, China.

In 2013, the company opened a warehouse in the MEPZ-SEZ zone in Chennai. A sales office was added in Cambridge, Massachusetts, in 2014. In 2017, a distribution center was opened in Amagasaki, Japan, and a GMP facility for custom synthesis began operations at the Fukaya site.

A new distribution center in Hyderabad, India, was opened in 2019. In 2023, the company's head office was relocated to Nihonbashi-Kodemmacho, Tokyo. Indian warehousing operations were shifted from Chennai to Hyderabad, and a new corporate office was opened in Chennai.

== Locations and subsidiaries ==
Tokyo Chemical Industry operates in the United States, Belgium, Germany, the United Kingdom, China, and India, with research and manufacturing facilities located in Japan, the United States, and China.

In Japan, the company maintains its worldwide headquarters in Tokyo. Other domestic operations include sales offices in Osaka; manufacturing and R&D facilities in Fukaya and Kumagaya; a repackaging center in Tsukuba; distribution centers in Kawaguchi and Amagasaki; and additional research sites in Oji and Toda.

In the United States, TCI's corporate head office, along with its manufacturing, research, distribution, and sales functions, is located in Portland, Oregon. Their facilities in Portland can perform custom synthesis following good manufacturing practices. An additional distribution center operates in Montgomeryville, Pennsylvania.

The company's Chinese operations are based in Shanghai, which serves as the corporate head office and includes manufacturing, research, distribution, and sales. Distribution and sales offices are also located in Tianjin, Beijing, and Pudong.

European operations include a corporate office, distribution center, and sales functions in Belgium; a sales head office in Germany; and sales operations in the United Kingdom.

In India, TCI maintains a registered office, along with R&D, quality control, distribution, and sales operations in Hyderabad. The corporate office is located in Chennai.

== Product lines and services ==
Tokyo Chemical Industry manufactures a wide range of research chemicals used in scientific research. Its catalog includes reagents for synthetic organic chemistry, such as catalysts, fluorinating agents, chiral building blocks, and protecting groups. In the field of bioscience, the company's compounds are used in pharmaceutical research and include enzymes, enzyme inhibitors, nucleotides, and amino acids.

Its materials science portfolio includes chemicals used in research on perovskite solar cells, battery technologies, liquid crystals, organic semiconductors, and polymer synthesis. The company has developed a synthetic process for electrochromic polymer materials alongside the National Institute for Materials Science, aiming to produce a commercially viable material for use in self-dimming windows.

The company also conducts custom synthesis and bulk manufacturing of chemical compounds, including those that are not commercially available or require specialized synthetic processes. TCI was noted for its production of (-)-sparteine, a common reagent that became difficult to source around 2010 highlighting its ability to create new synthetic methods for production.

== See also ==
- Chemical reagent
- Research chemical
- Fine chemical
- Specialty chemicals
- Chemical industry
- Organic synthesis
