= Pico Teneriffe (Barbados) =

- Location within Barbados

Highest point
- Elevation: 100 m (330 ft)
- Coordinates: 13°17′40″N 59°34′22″W

Geography
- Location: Saint Andrew, Barbados

Pico Teneriffe, is a rocky cape on the North-East coast of the island of Barbados, between the parishes of Saint Peter and Saint Andrew.

It is a coral cliff in the shape of a pinnacle that reaches 100 meters in height, named after the fact that the island of Tenerife in Spain is the first land east of Barbados, according to the inhabitants of the place. The presence in the place of people arrived from the Canary Islands in the time of the colonization of Barbados is not ruled out, but unlikely.

== See also ==
- Geography of Barbados
