= Tenerife Airport =

Tenerife Airport may refer to several airports on the Spanish island of Tenerife, in the Canary Islands:

- Tenerife North Airport (1978–present), formerly known as Los Rodeos Airport
- Tenerife South Airport (1978–present), also known as Reina Sofia Airport
