= Mount Teneriffe (Australia) =

Mountain in Victoria, Australia

- Location within Shire of Strathbogie

Highest point
- Elevation: 444 m (1,457 ft)AHD
- Coordinates: 36°50′50″S 145°23′16″E

Geography
- Location: Victoria, Australia
- Parent range: Strathbogie Ranges

Geology
- Rock age: Late Devonian 362 million years
- Mountain type: Strathbogie Granodiorite

Mount Teneriffe in central Victoria, Australia, is a distinctive granite formation, 444 m (1,457 ft) above sea level (200m above plain level). It takes its name from the island of Tenerife in Spain.

Most of the area is within a nature conservation reserve with impressive granite outcrops at the foot of the mountain. Mount Teneriffe is one of the outliers of the Strathbogie Ranges formed from uplifted Devonian granite, the erosion of which has filled in the once deep valleys and basins of the Upper Goulburn, the Murray Valley and the Victorian Riverina with sediment. The hill is lightly timbered with scattered small trees on the summit. The site is accessed from Alexanderson Rd and then Jefferies Rd and Oak Valley Rd.

Some rock-climbing crags are present on the north west face, including Sparrow Slabs, Castle Rock, Eagle Rock, and Vertigo Block. Mt. Teneriffe was the site of the 1983 Australian Rogaining Championships.

== See also ==
- List of mountains in Australia § Victoria
- Great Dividing Range
