= Montes Teneriffe =

Mountain range on the Moon

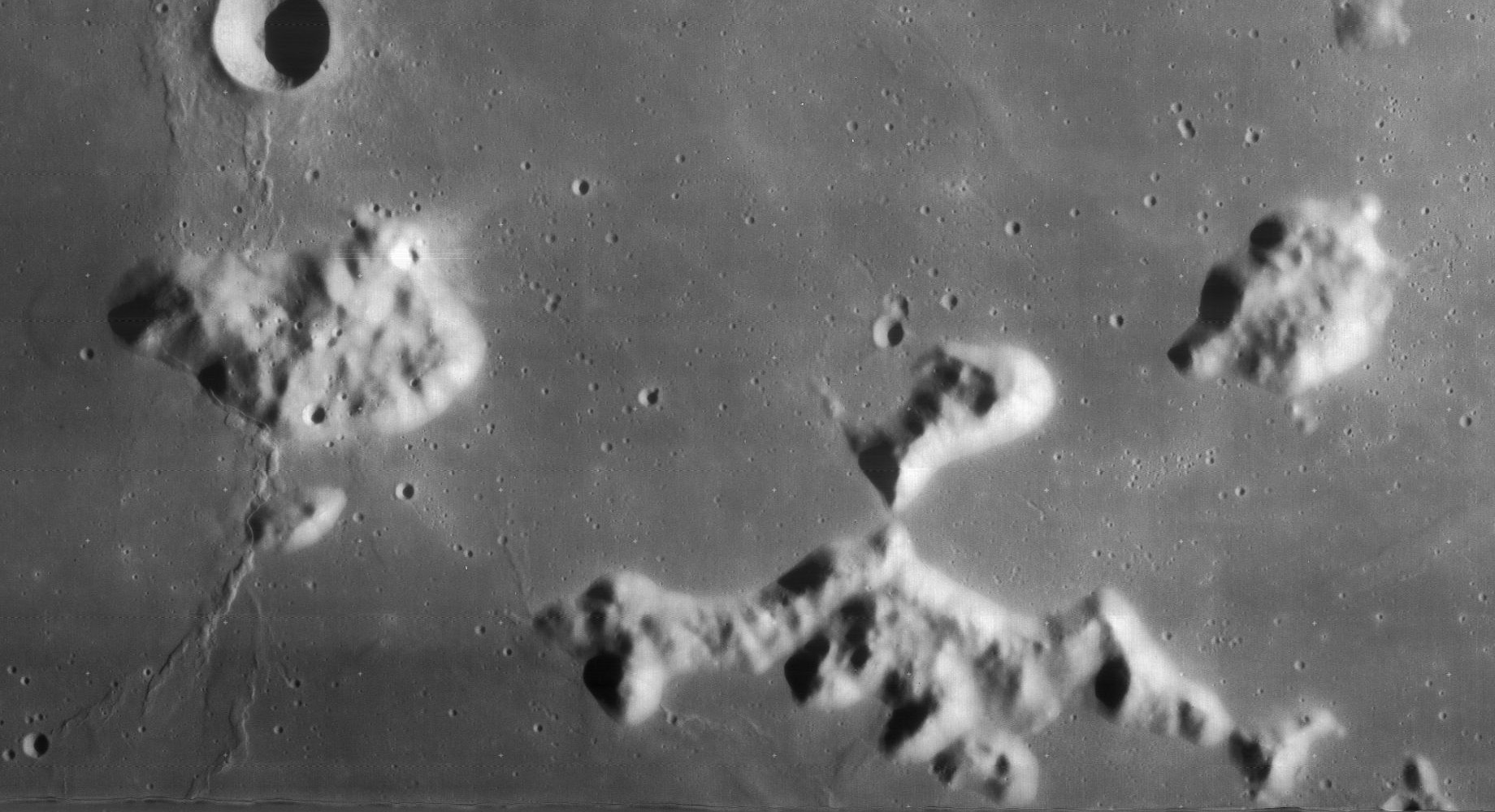
- Lunar Orbiter 4 image

Highest point
- Elevation: 2.4 km
- Listing: Lunar mountains
- Coordinates: 47.89°N 13.19°W

Geography
- Location: the Moon

Montes Teneriffe is a range on the northern part of the Moon's near side. It was named after Tenerife, one of the Canary Islands by William Radcliffe Birt.

This range is located in the northern part of the Mare Imbrium, to the southwest of the crater Plato. The Montes Teneriffe lie within a diameter of 112 kilometers, although the peaks only occupy a small part of that region. The formation consists of a few scattered ridges surrounded by the lunar mare. Individual peaks rise to heights of up to 2.4 km.

To the southeast of the range is the solitary Mons Pico. To the west of the range lies Montes Recti.

The feature consists of four main island like parts; on the west a large feature Montes Teneriffe ϵ with a small elevation just south Montes Teneriffe ω. In the centre a large mountain ridge running from east to west. The main western part is Montes Teneriffe δ, the easternmost peninsula carries the name MontesTeneriffe γ connecting both is Montes Teneriffe κ. North of the large massif are two island like features Montes Teneriffe α and Montes Teneriffe ι running in north eastern direction.

The exact locations of which can also be found on LAC 12, 24 and 25 from 1966 and 1967.
