= Mount Teneriffe (Washington) =

Mountain in Washington (state), United States

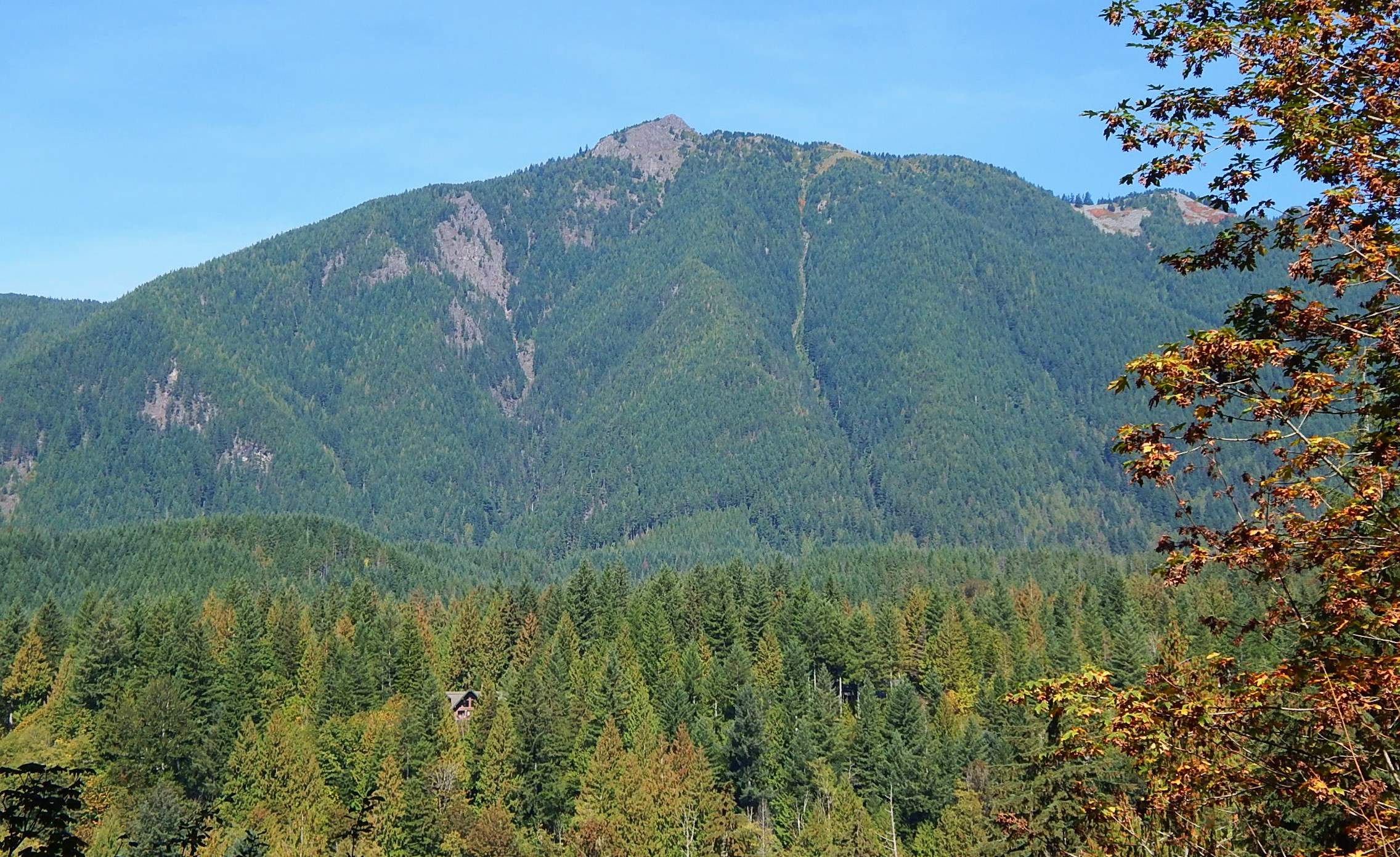

Highest point
- Elevation: 4,788 ft (1,459 m)
- Prominence: 628 ft (191 m)
- Coordinates: 47°30′32″N 121°41′43″W

Geography
- Location within Washington (state) Location within the United States
- Location: Washington, United States
- Parent range: Cascade Range
- Topo map: USGS Mount Si

Mount Teneriffe is a mountain located in King County of Washington state. The mountain is 1,459 meters high and is located at the western edge of the Cascade Range on land managed by Mount Baker-Snoqualmie National Forest. Its nearest higher peak is Green Mountain, 1.18 miles (1.90 km) to the northeast. The mountain takes its name from the island of Tenerife in Spain.

== Climate ==
Mount Teneriffe is located in the marine west coast climate zone of western North America. Most weather fronts originate in the Pacific Ocean, and travel northeast toward the Cascade Mountains. As fronts approach, they are forced upward by the peaks of the Cascade Range, causing them to drop their moisture in the form of rain or snowfall onto the Cascades (orographic lift). As a result, the west side of the Cascades experiences high precipitation, especially during the winter months in the form of snowfall. During winter months, weather is usually cloudy, but, due to high pressure systems over the Pacific Ocean that intensify during summer months, there is often little or no cloud cover during the summer. Precipitation runoff from Mount Teneriffe drains into tributaries of the Snoqualmie River.

== Geology ==
The history of the formation of the Cascade Mountains dates back millions of years ago to the late Eocene Epoch. During the Pleistocene period dating back over two million years ago, glaciation advancing and retreating repeatedly scoured the landscape leaving deposits of rock debris. The last glacial retreat in the area began about 14,000 years ago and was north of the Canada–US border by 10,000 years ago. The U-shaped cross section of the river valleys is a result of that recent glaciation. Uplift and faulting in combination with glaciation have been the dominant processes which have created the tall peaks and deep valleys of the Cascade Range.

== See also ==
- Geography of Washington (state)
