= North Fork Snoqualmie River =

Location
- Country: United States
- State: Washington
- County: King County

Physical characteristics
- Source: Lake Kanim
- Mouth: Snoqualmie River
  - location: Three Forks Natural Area, North Bend, Washington
  - coordinates: 47°31′13″N 121°46′32″W
  - elevation: 410 ft (120 m)
- Length: 26 mi (42 km)
- Basin size: 103.5 sq mi (268 km^{2})

The North Fork Snoqualmie River flows through a roughly 26-mile (42 km) course through the Cascade Range of Western Washington, United States. It originates as an alpine stream draining Lake Kanim, flowing northwest and then southwest through many rapids. It turns west again before arcing southward through a valley, as the river channel widens and becomes braided. It enters another set of rapids as it passes through Black Canyon further southwest. It converges with the Middle Fork and then the South Fork near the town of North Bend, Washington, forming the mainstem Snoqualmie River, which ultimately forms the Snohomish River and empties into Puget Sound.

The valley of the North Fork Snoqualmie was scoured by glacial ice during the Last Glacial Maximum, which forced embankments which altered its course. The river hosts salmonids such as cutthroat trout, rainbow trout, and brook trout, but access by migratory fish is blocked by the presence of Snoqualmie Falls on the mainstem. The water quality of the North Fork is high, although portions can reach high temperatures in the summer.

The Snoqualmie watershed is within the traditional territory of the Snoqualmie people, who used the upland portions of the North Fork watershed to hunt mountain goats. Euro-American settlement in the region began in the 1850s, and by the end of the century a logging industry had emerged in North Bend, which used timberland in the North Fork watershed. After an environmental dispute around a proposed dam on the Middle Fork during the 1970s, the North Fork was put forward as an alternative site, before the city of Bellevue's proposal to build the dam were rejected in the 1980s. Most of the basin consists of timberland, with much of the upper watershed within the Mount Baker–Snoqualmie National Forest. Rural residential areas occupy parts of the lower watershed.

== Course ==
The North Fork Snoqualmie River originates from Lake Kanim and flows generally southwest for 26 miles (42 km) through the Cascade Range, meeting the Middle Fork Snoqualmie near the town of North Bend, Washington. After flowing northwest and then southwest from Lake Kanim, the river meets Lennox Creek about 6 miles (9.7 km) from its source as it turns west. It later receives Sunday Creek from the south and arcs southward through a widening valley. About 16.8 miles (27.0 km) from its source, the North Fork enters Black Canyon, a stretch of intense rapids. After receiving Hancock Creek, it begins to turn southwest again, meeting the Middle Fork Snoqualmie River as it enters a broad floodplain, where it receives Tate Creek as a tributary. Shortly after this, the rivers converge with the South Fork Snoqualmie River to form the mainstem Snoqualmie River. The Snoqualmie River continues northwest for about 45 miles (72 km), eventually forming the Snohomish River and emptying into Puget Sound.

== Hydrology ==
The North Fork Snoqualmie drainage basin measures 103.5 square miles (268 km^{2}) in area, larger than that of the South Fork, but smaller than that of the Middle Fork. The highest elevation in the basin is the summit of Lennox Mountain, at 5,894 feet (1,796 m), while the lowest point is the river's confluence with the Middle Fork, at 410 feet (120 m).

The upper 5 miles (8.0 km) of the North Fork's course consists of a typical alpine stream, with many rapids and small waterfalls, but few riffles or pools. The substrate is mostly formed from rubble and boulders in this section. In the 7 miles (11 km), the substrate begins to include gravel and silt in slower-flowing areas, with a frequently braided channel widening to between 12 to 36 ft (3.7 to 11.0 m). The slope of the river decreases, with pools and gentle descents more common. Another set of rapids and cascades follows this, before the river's descent becomes moderate, as it flows over boulder and rubble substrate through various pools and riffles across the lowest few miles of its course. The river averages 73 ft (22 m) in width in the lower section of its course.

The main tributary streams of the river include Hancock Creek, Philippa Creek, Deep Creek, Sunday Creek, Lennox Creek, and Illinois Creek. Most of the river's tributaries are steeply descending creeks with many cascades and waterfalls, and typically rocky bottoms. Deep Creek and Sunday Creek are the longest tributary streams, featuring gravelly substrate and relatively moderate steepness.

=== Water flow and quality ===
The mean daily flow rate of the North Fork Snoqualmie across an average five-year period is 6,400 cubic feet (180 m^{3}) per second. The highest flow ever measured by the North Fork Snoqualmie stream gauge was 17,100 cubic feet (480 m^{3}) per second, recorded in 2009, while that of the river's 100-year flood (the largest expected flood in a 100-year period) is estimated at 18,700 cubic feet (530 m^{3}).

As of 2009, the water quality of the North Fork Snoqualmie is very good, although sampling had been limited to only the lower portions of the river. The North Fork is cooler than the Middle Fork by several degrees, and the small tributary streams in the lower watershed provide a source of cool water throughout the year, aiding fish. The river was not found to violate state standards of nutrient levels, pH, or dissolved oxygen. Levels of fecal coliform (fecal bacteria) are also very low, owing to the relative lack of human activity in the watershed.

Although the North Fork is cooled by its high forestation, the water has been recorded to reach as high as 66.2 °F (19.0 °C) during the summer. These higher temperatures in the watershed are likely due to a combination of forestry activity and the presence of a broad east–west valley in the upper course of the river, which allows for sunlight to warm the river across a slow and meandering stretch of its course.

== Geology ==
During the Last Glacial Period, the Puget Sound and its surrounding lowlands west of the Cascade Range were periodically covered by the glacial ice of the Puget Lobe, part of the much larger Cordilleran ice sheet. As the ice lobe advanced, the rivers of the range were redirected to flow south through eastern valleys. When the glaciers permanently retreated after the Last Glacial Maximum, many of these rivers continued to flow through these new courses. Like with many other of the region's streams, ice contact deposits formed a large embankment which partially blocks the valley of the North Fork Snoqualmie. These embankments date to the Vashon Stade of the Last Glacial Period, about 15,000 years ago. Slightly before this, alpine glaciers advanced and retreated, leaving the river valleys uncovered by the time of the last advance of the Puget Lobe.

A formation of slightly metamorphosed sedimentary rocks extends from North Bend past the North Fork Snoqualmie, containing greywacke in beds of varying size alongside smaller amounts of shale, breccia, and argillite. This formation has been tentatively dated to around the Cretaceous or Paleogene, between about 120 and 23 million years ago. Large outcroppings of volcanic rock are also found in the region. Mount Si, on the southern edge of the watershed, consists of the metamorphic rocks greenstone and greenschist. Around Lennox Creek is an igneous formation of andesite and tuff.

== Biology ==
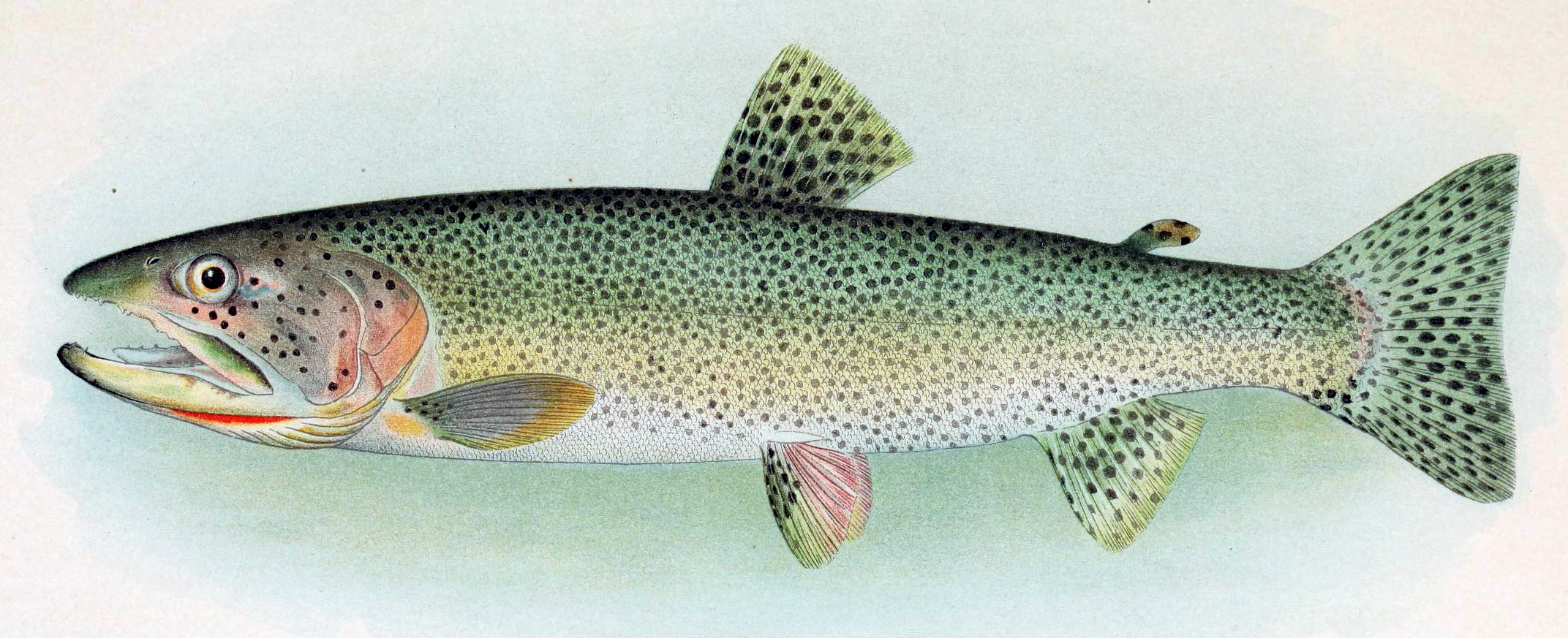
Cutthroat trout are common in the upper reaches of the river.

Cutthroat trout, rainbow trout, and brook trout were stocked in all three Snoqualmie forks during the mid-20th century. Two species of char, the Dolly Varden trout and the bull trout, have been listed by fishing guides as present in the North Fork, but these have not been independently verified in surveys. The presence of cutthroat, rainbow trout, and brook trout has been verified across the North Fork. Rainbow trout are most prevalent in the river near the mouth, while cutthroat trout become more common upriver.

The Washington Department of Fisheries planted coho salmon in the North Fork Snoqualmie several times during the late 1970s. Brook lamprey and small numbers of mountain whitefish have been observed in the lower portion of the river. Shorthead sculpin and cottids are common in the river, as are largescale suckers.

== Human history ==
The watershed of the Snoqualmie River and its tributaries is the traditional territory of the Snoqualmie people, a Lushootseed-speaking Coast Salish people who hunted, fished, and foraged in the upland valleys of the region, gathering berries and hunting game such as elk, deer, beavers, and grouse. Snoqualmie men traveled to the upper watershed of the North Fork to hunt mountain goats.

The Snoqualmie watershed was explored by Euro-American explorers during the early 1850s. The United States Army briefly operated a series of forts in the region in the mid-1850s during the Yakima War, while settlers began to arrive over the following decades. The nearby town of North Bend (initially named Snoqualmie) was platted in 1889 and incorporated in 1909. The logging industry in the watershed emerged during the 1870s, while logging and shingle milling expanded into North Bend by the 1890s and 1900s. During the early 20th century, the Snoqualmie Falls Lumber Company consolidated ownership over timberland in the North Fork Snoqualmie watershed. By the 1980s, these holdings were held by the Weyerhaeuser company.

=== Hydroelectric projects ===
In 1959, the Snohomish basin experienced severe floods, damaging homes and infrastructure. The Washington state government petitioned the United States Congress to provide funds for flood relief in the area. The King County government produced a series of studies and reports investigating the basin, and in 1970 the Army Corps of Engineers proposed the construction of a flood control dam and reservoir on the Middle Fork Snoqualmie. Although the county approved the construction, it met widespread opposition from environmentalist organizations, fearing environmental damage and commercial development in the watershed. Governor Daniel J. Evans vetoed the proposal in 1973. The state appointed the Ford Foundation to mediate between environmentalists and a group of local landowners who sought flood protection. The environmentalists were unwilling to agree to any modifications to the Middle Fork, but agreed in 1974 to a compromise proposal to instead build a dam on the North Fork Snoqualmie, which would reduce damage to local recreational areas, at the cost of reduced flood protection capabilities.

The King County government pursued the creation of a regional council of local governments to manage the project, but received skepticism from the adjacent Snohomish County government. A Corps of Engineers reconnaissance study in 1976 noted significant political and economic difficulties in constructing the dam. The federal government did not offer funds to compensate local landowners. The city of Bellevue to the west spent US$2,000,000 (equivalent to $5,987,000 in 2025) studying the proposed dam for its potential as a municipal water source. This would allow Bellevue to export large amounts of surplus water; the Bellevue city government likely pursued the study to allow the city to gain negotiating leverage over its larger neighbor Seattle. The Federal Energy Regulatory Commission rejected the city's request to build the dam, as well as an appeal in 1988.

Around the 1980s, Weyerhaeuser applied for a license to construct a hydroelectric facility in the North Fork basin. After the project was transferred between several different organizations, the Snohomish County Public Utility District constructed the Calligan Creek Hydroelectric Project and the Hancock Creek Hydroelectric Project in 2017, two run-of-the-river power stations located on tributary streams of the lower North Fork.

=== Modern land use ===
The upper watershed lies within the Mount Baker–Snoqualmie National Forest. About 10% of the river basin (consisting of two portions of the upper watershed) is located within the Alpine Lakes Wilderness, a wilderness area of the National Wilderness Preservation System. State protected areas include the 1,111-acre (450 ha) Snoqualmie Bog Natural Area Preserve, which protects a bog of sphagnum moss, and the 9,552-acre (3,866 ha) Mount Si Natural Resource Conservation Area, split between the basins of the North Fork and the Middle Fork.

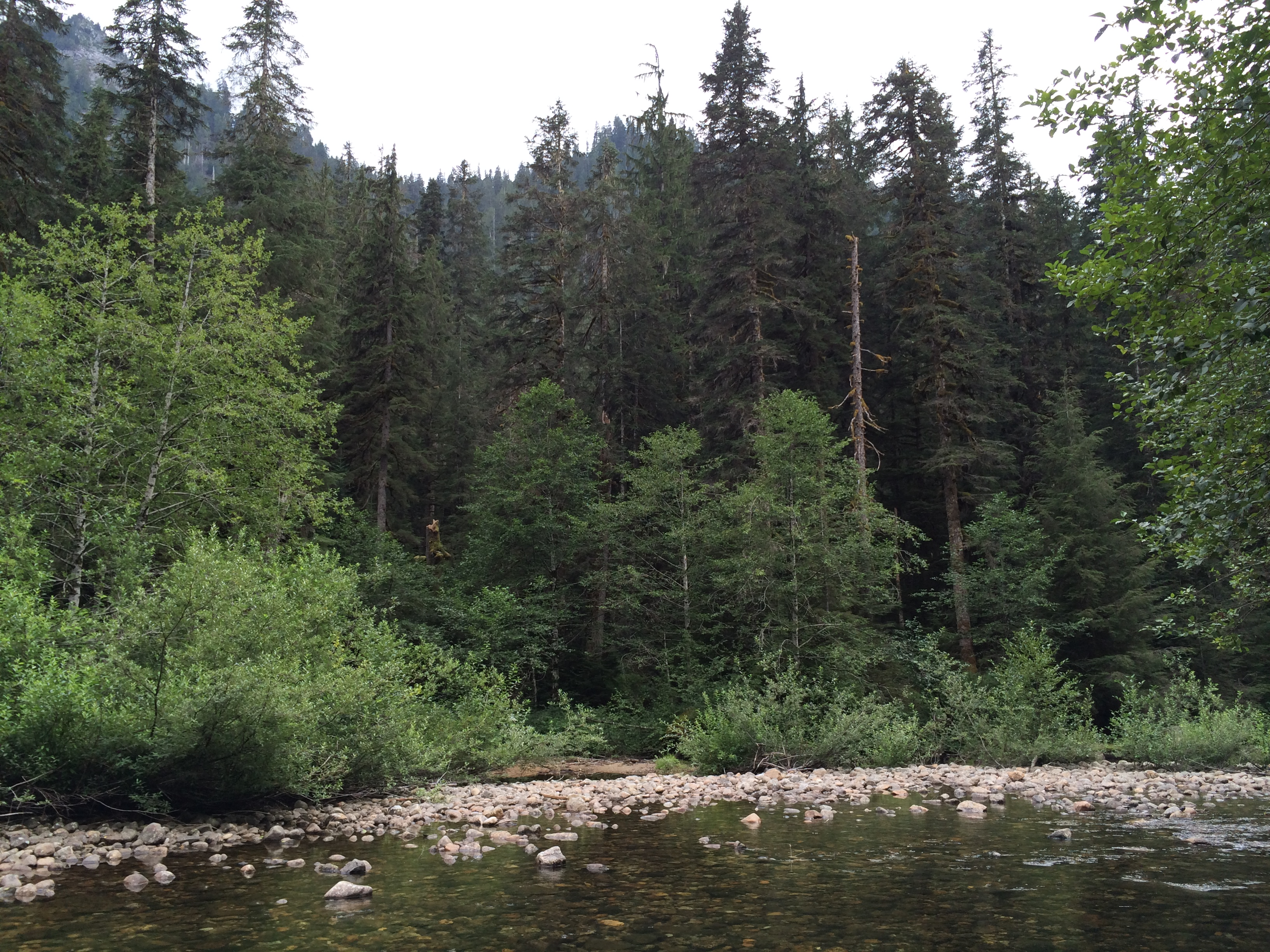
Forested terrain in Three Forks Natural Area, near the North Fork's mouth

The 418-acre (169 ha) Three Forks Natural Area covers the confluence of the three Snoqualmie forks, with connection to several major hiking trails, including the Snoqualmie Valley Regional Trail. Adjacent to the natural area, the North Fork Bridge was constructed over the river in 1951. As of 2026, the King County government is designing a replacement bridge, as the roads leading to the current structure commonly flood during storms. The park previously contained a revetment along the river, constructed in 1960 to protect what was then a livestock pasture from riverbank erosion. This was removed by the county in 2025.

As of 2009, 78% of the North Fork's watershed was covered in forest. Much of the rest of the basin consists of natural terrain such as rock, snow, and ice. A total of 97.4% of the basin was used for forestry, while about 2.0% of the lower portion of the watershed is zoned for rural residential occupancy, alongside small scale farming and livestock-rearing operations. Land ownership is divided between federal, state, and private owners. Mineral prospecting has identified deposits of copper, gold, silver, and molybdenite, but no extensive mining has been recorded in the watershed.
