= Paradise Lakes =

Lakes in Washington, United States

- Location within Washington (state) Location within the United States
- Location: King County, Washington, United States
- Coordinates: 47.65408°N 121.49959°W
- Primary outflows: Unnamed, tributary of North Fork of Snoqualmie River
- Basin countries: United States
- Surface elevation: 4,078 ft (1,243 m)

Paradise Lakes are a set of three small freshwater lakes located on a clif of the north skirt of Bare Mountain, in King County, Washington. Paradise Lakes sit in a bowl formed by a ridge that connects to the south ridge of Lennox Mountain. Paradise Lakes have an outflow that is a tributary of the North Fork of the Snoqualmie River from its source, Lake Kanim.

== Waterfalls ==
After the outflow of Paradise Lakes, halfway to the North Fork, the river plunges down a granite sluice into 200 feet (61 m) tall Paradise Lakes Falls, one of the biggest waterfalls of the North Fork Snoqualmie River as is neighboring Kanim Falls. On the opposite end, to the west of Paradise lakes is the origin of Illinois Creek which produces two waterfalls, 140 feet (43 m) tall Beaverdale Falls, and 120 feet (37 m) tall Illinois Creek Falls.

== See also ==
- List of lakes of the Alpine Lakes Wilderness
