= Patkanim =

Native American chief (1815–1860)

- paƛ̕adib
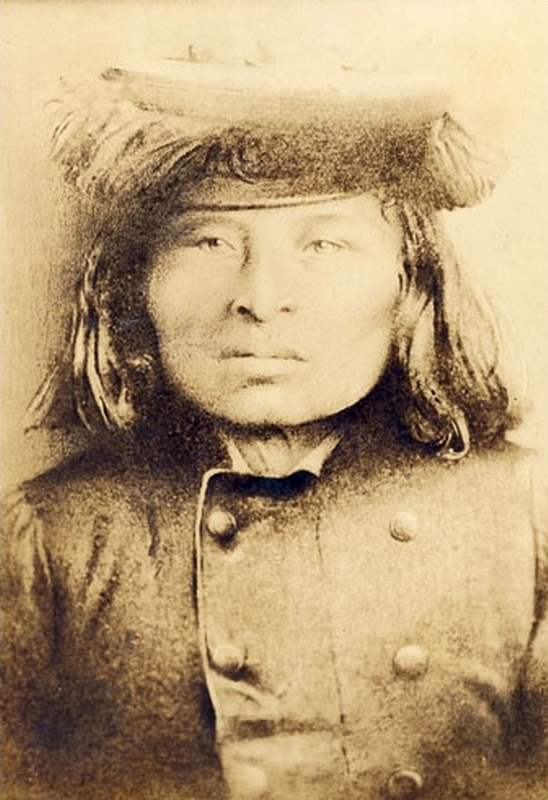
- Patkanim (c.~1855)

Snoqualmie leader

Chief Patkanim (Lushootseed: paƛ̕adib; variously spelled Patkanam or Pat Kanim) was chief of the Snoqualmoo (Snoqualmie) and Snohomish tribe in what is now modern Washington state.

During the 1850s, he lived at the largest Snoqualmie village, which was located at modern Fall City and had eighteen longhouses. He was the dominant power from Whidbey Island to Snoqualmie Pass, between what is today British Columbia and King County, Washington According to historian Bill Speidel, his was the major Indian power on Puget Sound, in no small part due to control of Snoqualmie Pass and therefore the profitable trade between the tribes on either side.

== Whidbey Island ==
Patkanim first gained notoriety among American settlers by arranging a meeting on Whidbey Island in 1848, of 8,000 Puget Sound Indians to discuss the rising threat of white colonists. As Hubert Howe Bancroft recounted:

Patkanim then opened the conference by a speech, in which he urged that if the Americans were allowed to settle among them they would soon become numerous, and would carry off their people in large fire-ships to a distant country on which the sun never shone, where they would be left to perish. He argued that the few now present could easily be exterminated, which would discourage others from coming...

A Steilacoom band leader, Chew-see-a-kit, rejected the considered attack. The white settlers residing in his land were seen as deterrent to raids by Northern Puget Sound tribes, such as the Snoqualmies.

== Raid on Fort Nisqually ==
On 1 May 1849 Patkanim led 100 Snoqualmies to Fort Nisqually, a farming and trade post ran by the Hudson's Bay Company's subsidiary Puget Sound Agricultural Company. Rumors stated a daughter of one of their prominent leaders was being abused by her Nisqually husband, Lahalet, father of Leschi. The band also declaimed any intentions of attacking white inhabitants in the area. Despite Patkanim being allowed in to Fort Nisqually, relations became tense and a skirmish began. As the fort gate was closing, several Americans unaffiliated with the PSAC remained outside. Fellow American settler Michael Simmons beseeched them to enter the secure station, but they refused to enter. During the ensueing fighting, one American was killed and two wounded. The officer in charge of Fort Nisqually, Chief Factor William Tolmie, stated that the visiting Snoqualimies likely had the intention to "kick a row with the Fort Indians" and hold a slave raid. Thereafter, he found it more profitable to co-operate with the settlers, reportedly turning over his own brothers to be hanged for the raid in exchange for $500.

== Later relations with Americans ==
In 1854, Patkanim assisted U.S. Army Captain George McClellan (later a Civil War major general) in exploring Snoqualmie Pass as part of the Pacific Railroad Surveys. On January 22, 1855, he signed the Treaty of Point Elliott, trading away several modern counties in exchange for a reservation near Tulalip, Washington.

Patkanim maintained excellent relations with the founders of Seattle, such as Doc Maynard and Arthur Denny. With the approach of the Puget Sound War, they persuaded him to ally himself, for a fee, with the forces of the United States. He assisted in constructing forts and encamped at Fort Tilton with 100 of his troops to block Snoqualmie Pass. After the Battle of Seattle in 1856, Governor Isaac Stevens put a bounty on the head of raiders, $20 for ordinary Indians and $80 for a "chief". Patkanim obligingly provided a great many heads, until the Territorial Auditor put a stop to the practice. According to Speidel, there was a suspicious number of "chiefs" among the heads and many of them were probably nothing more than Patkanim's slaves from raids on other tribes.

== Legacy ==
Chief Kanim public middle school in Fall City Washington is named after one of his nephews, Chief Jerry Kanim. Kanim Falls and Lake Kanim in the heart of the Alpine Lakes Wilderness are also named after the same nephew.

Reportedly, Patkanim had three daughters, Julia, Susie and Elizabeth (Lizzie).

A marker was raised to his memory, near Tulalip, but appears not to include a date of birth or death.

The descendants of Patkanim and the tribe he led are divided today between the Snoqualmie and the smaller Snoqaulmoo bands.
