= Bear Lakes =

Lakes in Washington, United States

- Location within Washington (state) Location within the United States
- Location: King County, Washington, United States
- Coordinates: 47.64798°N 121.485943°W
- Primary outflows: Bear Creek
- Basin countries: United States
- Surface area: 2.5 acres (1.0 ha)
- Surface elevation: 4,678 ft (1,426 m)

Bear Lakes is a set of small freshwater lakes located on the southwest skirt of Canoe Peak, in King County, Washington. Several mines are located in the vicinity of Bear Lakes. Access is from Bear Creek Trail which continues along abandoned and mostly overgrown mine routes. Cable reels and other mining artifacts are frequent along the trail and in the surrounding areas of the lake. Lake Kanim is a short distance north over Canoe Peak towards Lennox Mountain, and Paradise Lakes are west of Bear Lakes.

== Mining ==
Bear Lake is located in a prominent mining location. North of the lake, East of Canoe Peak is the Brooklyn claims. The mine is just above other mines along Bear Creek and south of Canoe Peak Ridge towards Lennox Lake.

== See also ==
- List of lakes of the Alpine Lakes Wilderness
