= South Fork Snoqualmie River =

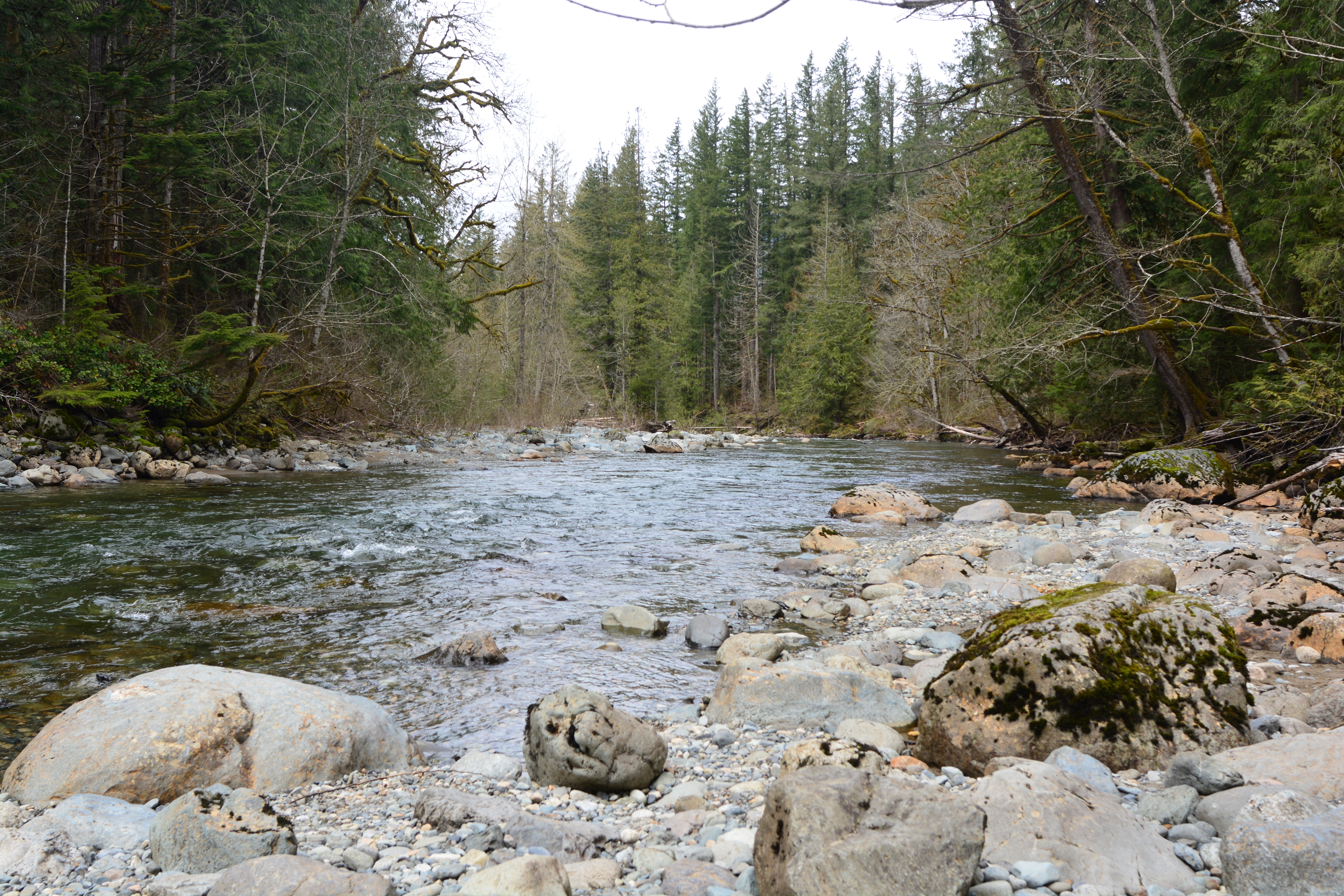

Location
- Country: United States
- State: Washington
- County: King County

Physical characteristics
- Source: Source Lake
  - coordinates: 47°27′20″N 121°27′7″W
- Mouth: Confluence with Snoqualmie River
  - coordinates: 47°31′29″N 121°47′11″W
  - elevation: 410 ft (120 m)
- Length: 30.8 mi (49.6 km)
- Basin size: 85.40 sq mi (221.2 km^{2})

Basin features
- River system: Snohomish River
- Cities: North Bend
- Waterfalls: Franklin Falls, Weeks Falls, Twin Falls

The South Fork Snoqualmie River runs for 30.8 miles (49.6 km) through a portion of the Cascade Mountains in western Washington, United States. Originating at Source Lake in the Alpine Lakes Wilderness of the Mount Baker–Snoqualmie National Forest, it flows through the mountains to Snoqualmie Pass, before descending westward, passing through numerous waterfalls and rapids. It meets the other forks of the Snoqualmie River after running north through the town of North Bend. The upper course of the river is a hanging valley, overlying bedrock and glacial deposits, while the lower course is braided and meandering, except for its levee-reinforced course through North Bend. The river runs through a large igneous intrusion and a valley shaped by the advance of ice sheets during the Last Glacial Maximum, around 14,000 years ago.

The South Fork Snoqualmie hosts salmonids such as cutthroat trout and rainbow trout, although the river's waterfalls and the presence of Snoqualmie Falls further downstream prevents the use of the river by anadromous (migratory) fish. The region was traditionally inhabited by the Snoqualmie people to the west and the Yakama to the east. Euro-American settlement in the region began during the 1840s and 1850s. The town of North Bend, platted in 1889, hosted logging operations and became a rest stop for travel over Snoqualmie Pass. The town grew after the construction of the Milwaukee Railroad in 1909 and the Sunset Highway in 1915, both of which passed through the South Fork valley. Interstate 90 now runs along the South Fork as it crosses the pass.

== Course ==
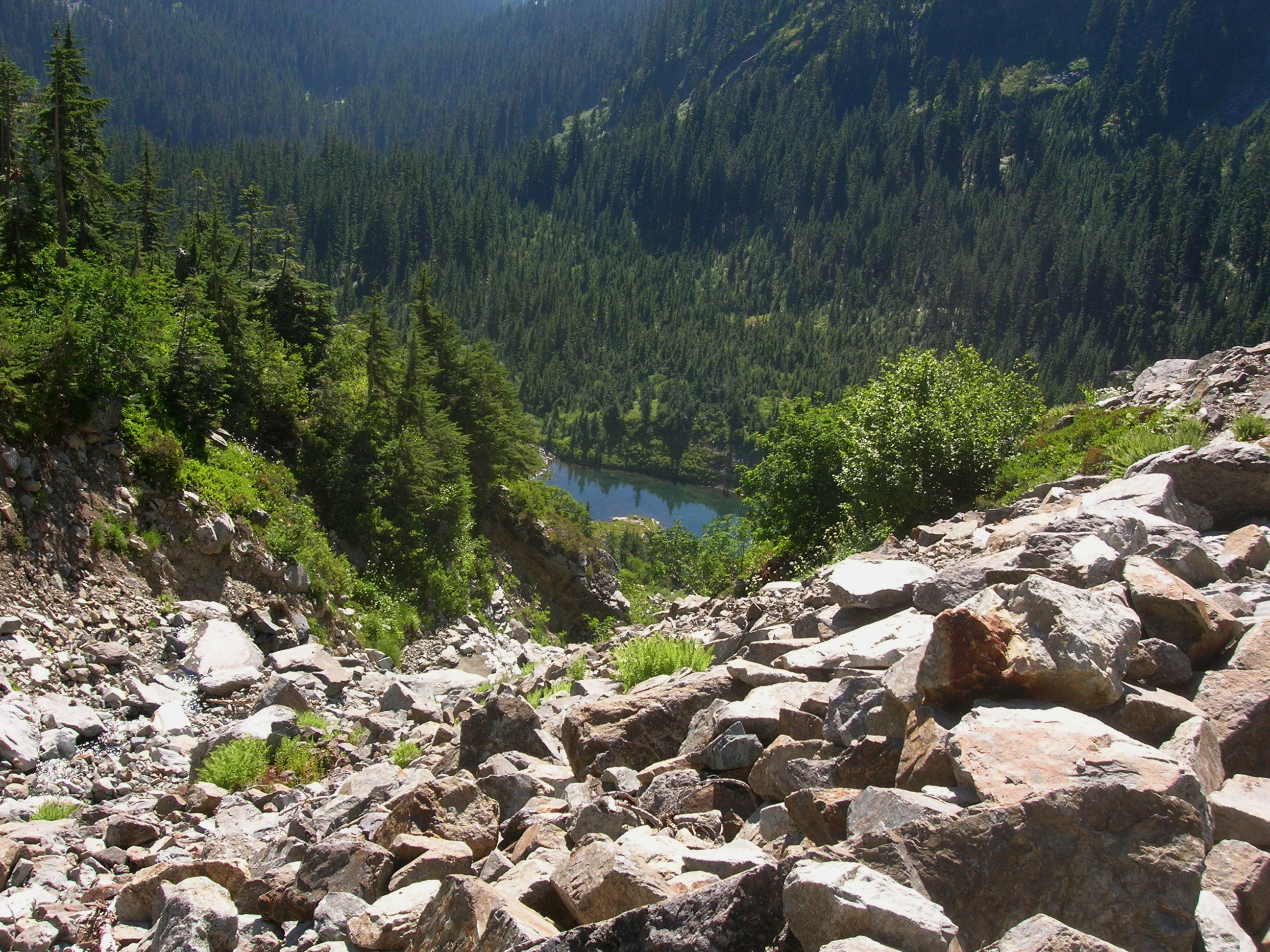
Source Lake, the source of the South Fork Snoqualmie, near Alpental ski area

The South Fork Snoqualmie River originates from Source Lake in the Alpine Lakes Wilderness of the Mount Baker–Snoqualmie National Forest, flowing a total of 30.8 miles (49.6 km) before meeting the Snoqualmie River. It flows southeast for 3 miles (4.8 km) before reaching Snoqualmie Pass near the crest of the Cascade Mountains, taking in Commonwealth Creek as a tributary. It turns southwest, takes in small mountain streams as tributaries, and passes down a number of waterfalls and rapids. These include Franklin Falls, a series of several bedrock waterfalls which descend a total of 134 ft (41 metres). About 3.7 miles (6.0 km) from its turn, it takes in Rockdale Creek, and its river valley begins to alternate between wider and narrower sections. After flowing to the southwest and west for another 3.7 miles (6.0 km), it turns to the northwest, a direction it maintains for the next 20 miles (32 km) of its course, as its descent becomes less steep.

At about 17.9 miles (28.8 km) from its source the South Fork Snoqualmie begins a steeper descent, entering a narrow channel that ranges between 7 to 12 yards (6.4 to 11.0 m) in width, in which are located various rapids and cascades. There are two major waterfalls, Weeks Falls and the particularly large Twin Falls. The river descends a total of 600 ft (180 m) in this section. After the falls, the river's descent becomes shallower and its valley becomes wider. It turns north and passes through the town of North Bend, Washington. It meets the mainstem Snoqualmie River (formed by the nearby confluence of the North Fork and Middle Fork) about 2 miles (3.2 km) north of North Bend. The Snoqualmie River continues northwest, eventually forming the Snohomish River and emptying into Puget Sound.

== Hydrology ==
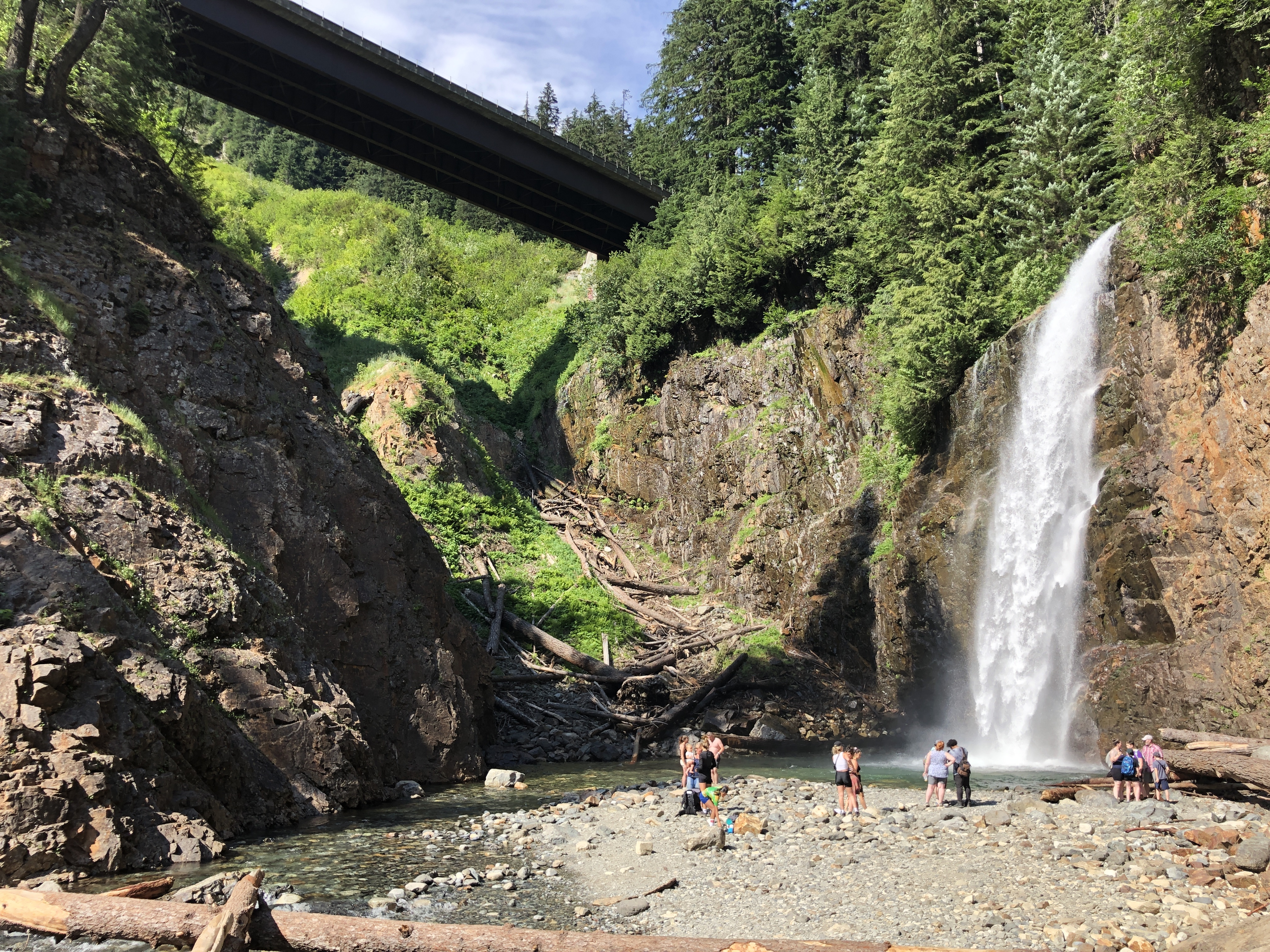
Franklin Falls on the upper South Fork Snoqualmie River

The South Fork Snoqualmie's drainage basin measures 85.40 square miles (221.2 km^{2}) in area, making it the smallest of the three Snoqualmie forks. The watershed ranges in elevation from 6,278 feet (1,914 m) above sea level at the summit of Snoqualmie Mountain to 410 feet (120 m) at its mouth. It receives many small tributary streams, most steeply descending from the mountains.

The river's shallower grade in the lower portions of its course reduce its capacity to transport sediment, causing it to braid and meander across a large floodplain due to deposited sediment. The reach of the river passing through North Bend is almost entirely confined by artificial levees, preventing braiding and channel migration. Two small hydroelectric run-of-the-river dams are located on South Fork at Twin Falls and Weeks Falls.

The main daily flow of the river measures about 3,700 cubic feet (100 m^{3}) per second. The flow rate of a 100-year flood (the maximum flow rate expected for a 100 year period) for the South Fork Snoqualmie at North Bend is estimated at around 15,150 cubic feet (429 m^{3}) per second, while a 20-year flood is estimated at 11,302 cubic feet (320.0 m^{3}) per second. The highest flow rate ever recorded by the river gage in North Bend was 13,500 cubic feet (380 m^{3}) per second, achieved during a flood in November 2006.

== Geology ==
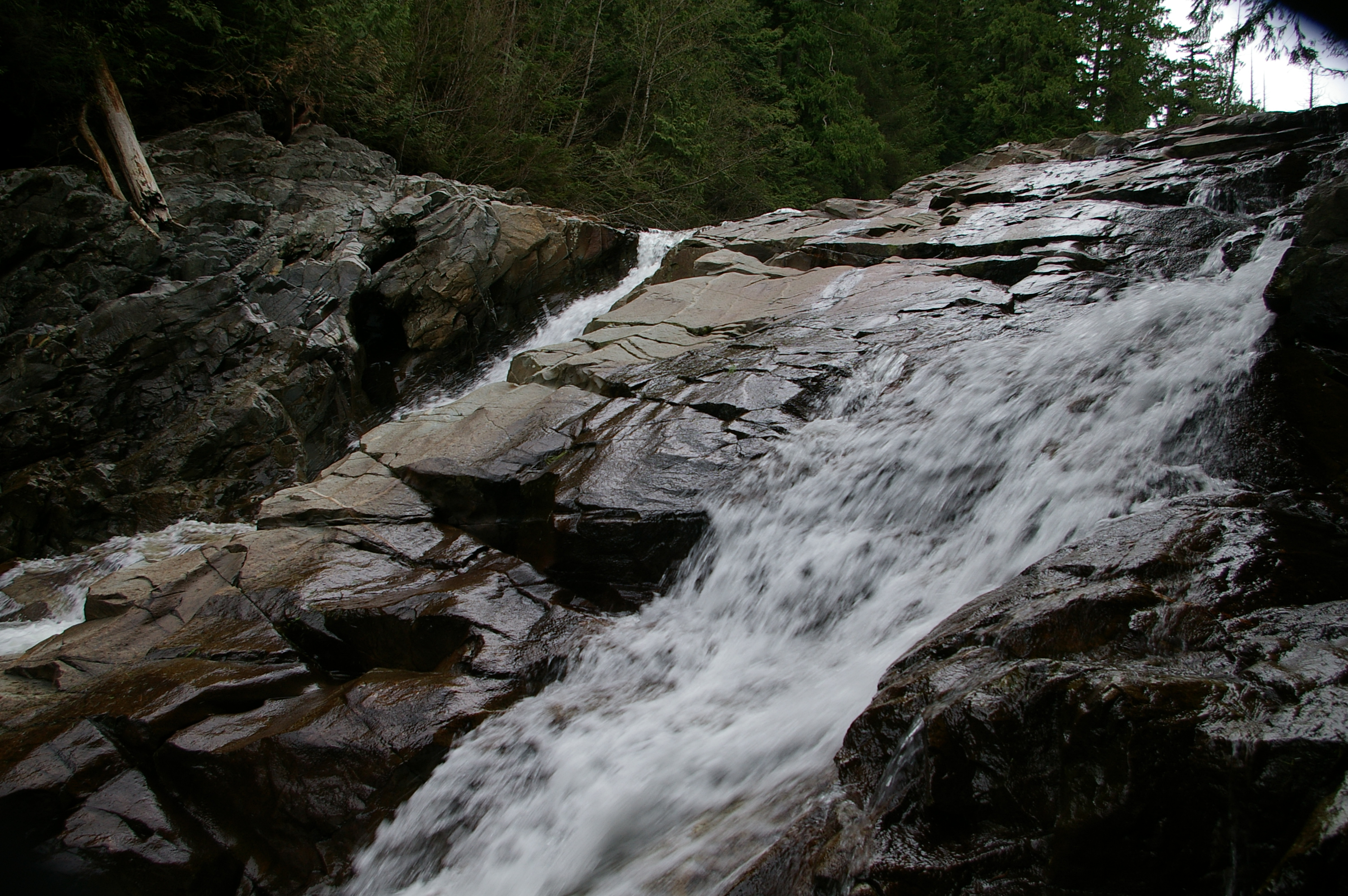
The river descending through Weeks Falls

The South Fork Snoqualmie passes through a valley of the Cascade Range. It cuts through a portion of the Snoqualmie batholith, a large igneous intrusion found on either side of the river. Most of the batholith dates between 17 and 20 million years ago, during the Miocene, although some of its northern portions may date to the Oligocene, about 25 million years ago. A large belt of mélange (a breccia composed of distorted and heterogeneous fragment) stretches across the western portion of the Cascades, dating to the Late Cretaceous and early Eocene (100–40 million years ago). As the belt was located on what was then the western coast of North America, it contains both igneous and sedimentary marine rocks.

The upper course of the river is a hanging valley, ending with the rapid vertical drops around Twin Falls. Bedrock underlies much of this area, with both glacial deposits and alluvium at the valley floor. The topography of the upper valley is mainly shaped by the activity of alpine glaciers, while the area below Twin Falls was shaped by the advance and retreat of the Puget Lobe, part of the massive Cordilleran ice sheet which covered much of North America during the Last Glacial Maximum. The last of several advances of the Puget Lobe occurred about 14,000 years ago. Glacial outwash created a system of moraines about 9.3 miles (15 km) long, blocking the mouth of the South Fork and Middle Fork Snoqualmie valleys and preventing a connection with the Cedar River watershed.

The lower course of the Middle Fork and South Fork flow through an alluvial fan. Many smaller relict channels of unknown age cross over this surface. Many likely formed from erosion during floods, while others may have originally been distributary streams or historic courses of the Middle Fork.

== Biology ==
Salmonids such as cutthroat trout, rainbow trout, brook trout, and mountain whitefish are found in the South Fork Snoqualmie. Due to the presence of Snoqualmie Falls on the mainstem Snoqualmie 3 miles (4.8 km) downstream from the confluence with the South Fork, anadromous (migratory) fish cannot access the South Fork basin. As such, all salmonids in the Snoqualmie forks are non-migratory. Cascades such as Twin Falls and the steep grade in the upper portions of the river also serve as barriers to salmonoids on the South Fork. Whitefish in the river are not found above Twin Falls, and 2001 surveys of the upper river near the Alpental ski area found cutthroat trout as the only resident salmonoid.

Species of the sculpin genus Cottus have been found in the river. By the 1970s, fish hatcheries had begun to occasionally plant juvenile Chinook and coho salmon in the river, as it forms a highly suitable habitat for the fish.

== Human history ==
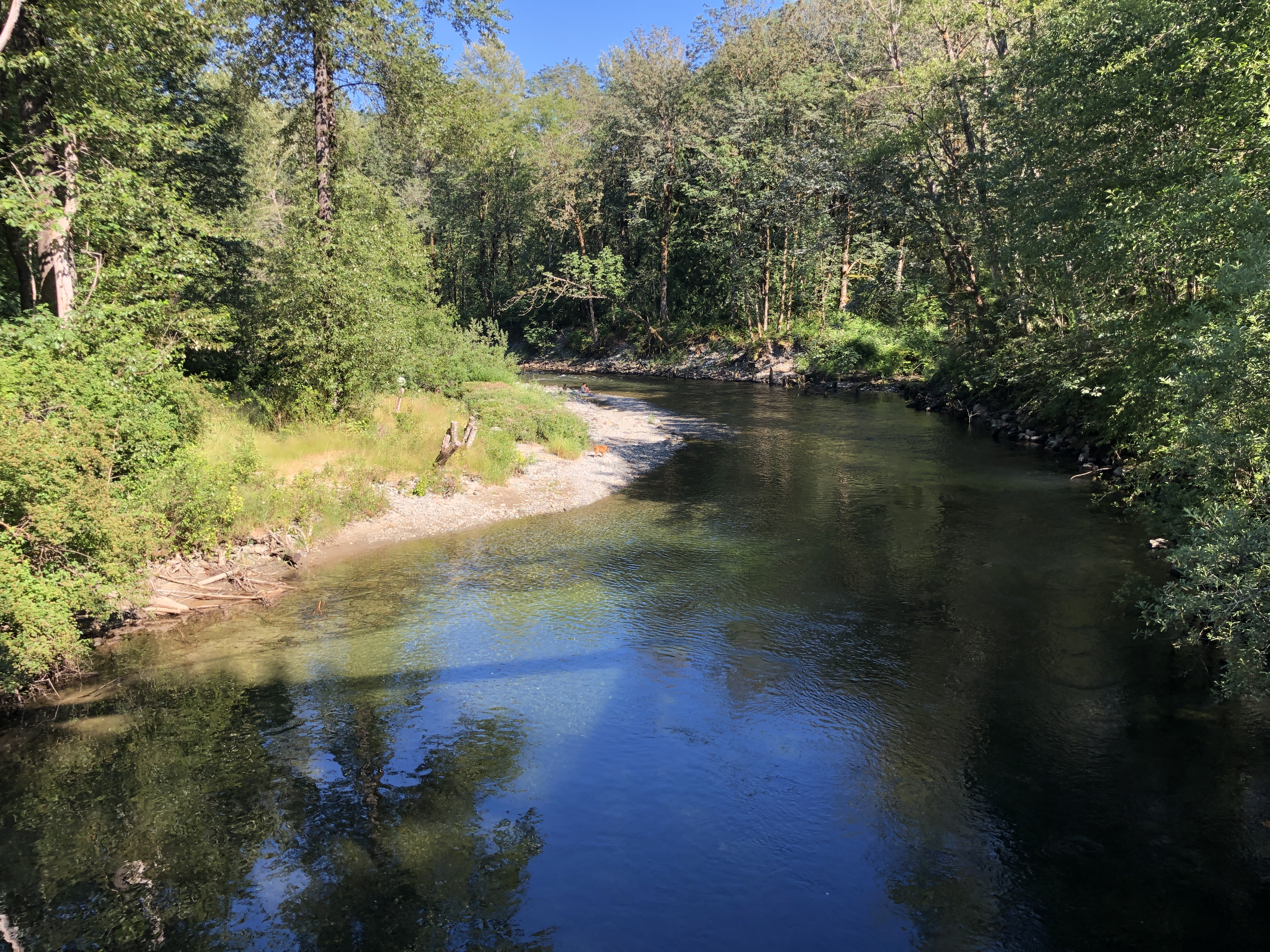
The river southeast of North Bend

The region around Snoqualmie Pass is traditionally inhabited by the Snoqualmie (a Coast Salish-speaking people) to the west and the Yakama (a Sahaptian-speaking people) to the east. The Snoqualmie village of səxʷq̓ʷuʔq̓ʷuʔ (anglicized Sotsoks) was located on the western bank of the river near what is now North Bend. This village emerged as a center for potlatches and other ceremonies. At the time of Euro-American contact, Snoqualmie Pass hosted one of the two main trails used to pass between the Cascades in the region, alongside the nearby Yakima Pass between the Yakama and Cedar River basins.

American settlers arrived in the region during the 1840s and 1850s, by which point local native nations had had intermittent contact with explorers and Hudson's Bay Company fur traders for several decades. Military officer and surveyor George B. McClellan described the pass along the South Fork Snoqualmie as a particularly difficult journey, noting that natives used it infrequently. In 1856, during the Yakima War, the United States Army built Fort Smalley along the lower South Fork Snoqualmie near North Bend. It was part of a series of fortifications the army constructed in the Snoqualmie Valley, fearing an alliance between the Yakima and the native nations west of the Cascades, such as the Duwamish and Puyallup. However, conflict in the area had mostly ceased by the time the forts were finished, and they were soon abandoned. A homesteader named Jeremiah Borst became the first Euro-American settler in the valley around 1858, using the buildings of the abandoned Fort Smalley and the nearby Fort Alden as his base for farm and trading post.

Snoqualmie Pass was transited by American settlers during the mid-19th century. The trail passed through the meandering floodplain of the South Fork, which frequently blocked it. One settler, William H. Taylor, recalled that travelers needed to cross the river 17 times to travel between Snoqualmie Pass and the future site of North Bend between the Middle and South Forks. In 1865, the Danish-American settler Matts Peterson became among the first to live in this area, but later sold the site. Taylor moved into the old Patterson cabin in 1880, establishing a farm and trading post. Profiting off hop farming and anticipating railway expansion into the pass, Taylor platted the town of Snoqualmie in 1889, renaming it to North Bend several years later. The town was incorporated in 1909. A toll bridge was constructed over the South Fork Snoqualmie by the late 1890s.

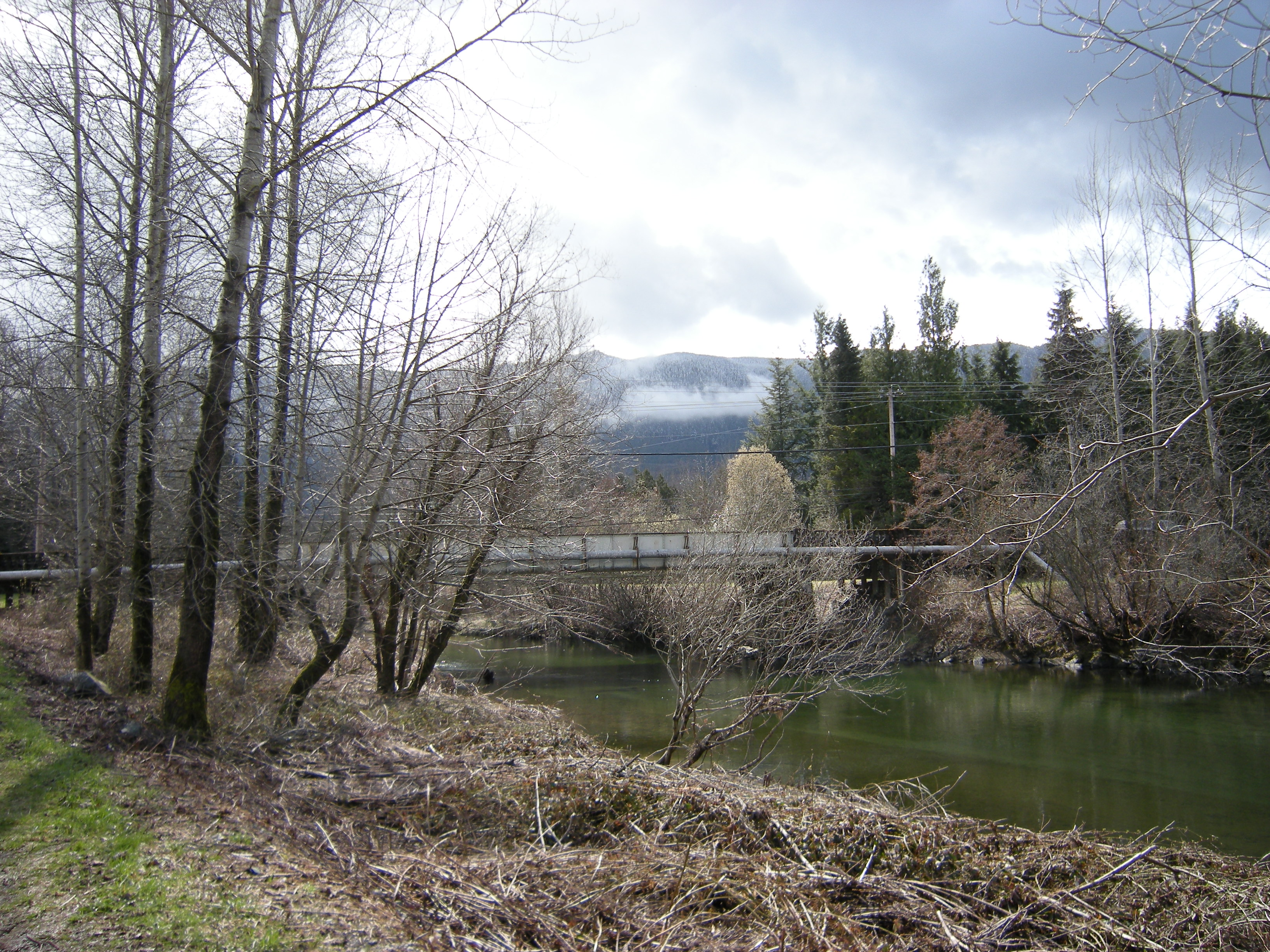
State Route 202 crossing over the river in North Bend, as seen from the levee

The 1890s and 1900s saw the expansion of logging in the Snoqualmie Valley. In 1906, the North Bend Lumber Company constructed a logging mill on Boxley Creek, a tributary of the South Fork Snoqualmie. Adjacent to the watershed, the Chester Morse Lake (draining into the Cedar River) was dammed in the mid-1910s, causing water levels to rise dramatically. Seepage into a glacial moraine allowed the lake and the Cedar watershed to indirectly feed the nearby Rattlesnake Lake and Boxley Creek, tributaries of the South Fork Snoqualmie. In December 1918, a heavy storm caused the lake to burst through the moraine and flood Boxley Creek (an event dubbed the Boxley Burst), destroying the logging community of Edgewick and causing hundreds of thousands of gallons of water and sediment to drain into the South Fork Snoqualmie.

A portion of the Milwaukee Road and an accompanying postal telegraph line was constructed through the Snoqualmie Pass in 1909, following the South Fork for part of its route. Over the path of an old wagon road through Snoqualmie Pass and the South Fork valley, the Sunset Highway was constructed in 1915, allowing automobiles to pass through the Cascades. The road was paved by 1936, and the area became a popular rest stop for motorists crossing through the mountains. Logging activity greatly expanded in the region, boosted by the establishment of a Civilian Conservation Corps lumber camp in the South Fork valley east of North Bend in 1935. Interstate 90, a freeway, now follows the South Fork across 24 miles (39 km) of its course, from North Bend to Snoqualmie Pass.
