= Eanus hatchi =

Conservation status
- Critically Imperiled (NatureServe)

Scientific classification
- Kingdom: Animalia
- Phylum: Arthropoda
- Clade: Pancrustacea
- Class: Insecta
- Order: Coleoptera
- Suborder: Polyphaga
- Infraorder: Elateriformia
- Family: Elateridae
- Genus: Eanus
- Species: E. hatchi

Binomial name
- Eanus hatchi Lane, 1938

Eanus hatchi, commonly known as Hatch's click beetle, is a critically imperiled species of click beetle known only from the Puget Sound of Washington, named in honor of notable entomologist Melville H. Hatch. It's the only species in its genus, Eanus, that inhabits Sphagnum bogs at low elevation.

== Description ==
Eanus hatchi can be distinguished from E. striatipennis by being smaller, more elongated, shinier, having more distinct head impressions, the antennal segments 2 and 3 combined being shorter than 4 in males, intermediate segments being longer than wide and being less serrated, the pronotum being smaller and more square, with finer and more scattered punctuation and the carina of the backwards angles being lacking, the elytra being wider than the pronotum and over twice as wide as long, with deeper striae that have convex and less roughly pointed intervals, the underside being more evenly, finely, and sparsely pointed, and having a shorter and stouter aedeagus that is curved on both edges and arced on the outer angle of the tips.

They range in size from 7 to 9.3 mm in length and 2.3 to 3.3 mm in width, with females being broader and more robust proportionally to length than males. They are a shiny dark metallic color ranging from green to purple, except on the antennae and tibiae which are brownish black, and the tarsi which are light brown. Body covering (either hairs or scales) on top are short and non-distinct, whilst those on the bottom are still short and fine but more distinctive and a gray color.

== Habitat & ecology ==
Eanus hatchi is endemic to low to mid elevation, mostly below 305 meters or 1000 feet, eutrophic Sphagnum bogs within forests in King and Snohomish counties, having been found at King's Lake Bog, Snoqualmie Bogs, Lake Marie, Chase Lake, and Carkeek Park, as well as undisclosed areas in southern King County. It is expected to occur more widely, but searches have thus far failed to confirm this, with its known range covering an area of 250-1000 square kilometers or 100-400 square miles.

Adults are often found on low floating mats of Sphagnum, also spending some of their time on shrubs and trees, namely flowering shrubs like bog Labrador tea (Rhododendron groenlandicum), and on the leaves of hemlock (Tsuga) species. The adults are most active in early spring, usually in April and May and occasionally June, and are hypothesized to feed on flowers, including honey dew, pollen, nectar, and the parts of the flower. The larvae live around the bog margins above the water line, likely preying on small insects and inhabiting sphagnum moss mats and decaying wood.

== Conservation ==
It is currently considered critically imperiled by NatureServe and as moderate-high vulnerability to climate change by Washington Department of Fish & Wildlife. It may have been extirpated from Snohomish County, as the two sites there, Chase Lake and Carkeek Park, have been heavily altered by urban development. In fact, attempts to locate it at Carkeek Park found neither the beetle nor even Sphagnum. As a species capable of flight, it's thought to occur more widely than King County, with even more extensive searches throughout the Puget Trough being recommended, as the adults are only active in early spring, when few entomologists are doing fieldwork. Their habitat, which makes up only 3 percent of wetlands in Western Washington, is threatened by urban development, logging, insecticides, trampling by humans and livestock, and climate change. These factors can alter the hydrology and water quality and directly damage the beetles and the habitats they rely on. Over-collecting may also threaten them.
