= Calligan Creek Hydroelectric Project =

Power station in Western Washington, US

Coordinates: 47.6065°N 121.7104°W

The Calligan Creek Hydroelectric Project is a 6 MWe Pelton wheel run-of-the-river hydroelectric power station in Western Washington. It is operated by the Snohomish County Public Utility District on a tributary of the Snoqualmie River in King County, Washington, approximately 30 miles (48 km) east of Seattle. The power station has been operational since February 2018. As of year-end 2024, the project produces 17,156 MWh of power per year.

Construction involved building a 45-foot (14 m) wide, 8-foot (2.4 m) tall weir for the water not diverted through the turbine to flow over; a fish ladder; a 1.2-mile (1.9 km) penstock; a powerhouse; and 2.5 miles (4.0 km) of transmission line to interconnect with the grid.

== See also ==
- Snoqualmie Falls Hydroelectric Plant
