= Middle Fork Snoqualmie River =

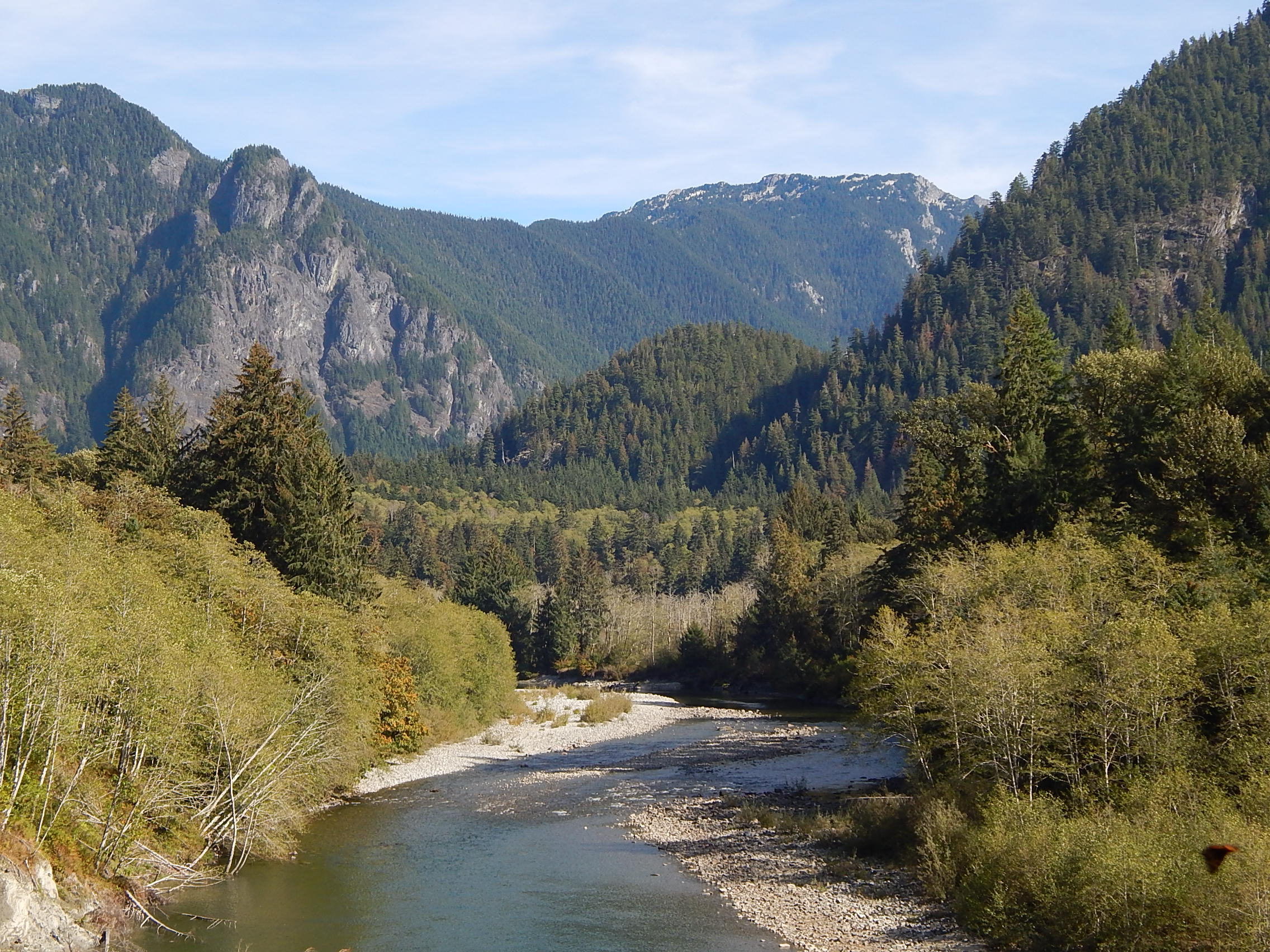
- Overlooking Preacher Mountain from the Middle Fork Snoqualmie

Location
- Country: United States
- State: Washington
- County: King County

Physical characteristics
- Source
  - location: La Bohn Gap
  - coordinates: 47°33′33″N 121°14′16″W
- Mouth: Snoqualmie River
  - location: Three Forks, North Bend, Washington
  - coordinates: 47°31′11″N 121°46′30″W
  - elevation: 400 ft (120 m)
- Length: 35 mi (56 km)
- Basin size: 170.5 sq mi (442 km^{2})

Basin features
- Tributaries
  - left: Pratt River
  - right: Taylor River

National Wild and Scenic River
- Official name: Middle Fork Snoqualmie
- Type: Wild, Scenic
- Designated: December 19, 2014

The Middle Fork Snoqualmie River runs through a roughly 35 miles (56 km) portion of the Cascade Range in western Washington, United States. It is the largest of the three forks of the Snoqualmie River, exceeding that of the North Fork and South Fork. Originating at the crest of the range near La Bohn Peak, it flows west through an initially narrow river channel, which widens into a broad river valley with a substrate of earth and rock banks. It meets the North and South Forks near the town of North Bend, forming the mainstem Snoqualmie, which itself later forms the Snohomish River and drains into Puget Sound. The river basin is home to various animal species, including beavers, black bears, cutthroat trout, and mountain whitefish.

The valley was heavily shaped by glacier movement during the Quaternary glaciation, when the present of a glacial dam created a large proglacial lake in its valley. Indigenous peoples have lived in the region for many millennia, and a Snoqualmie village was located near its confluence with the South Fork in precolonial times. Euro-American settlement and intensive logging in the region began in the late 19th century, with logging activity peaking in the 1940s and then gradually declining. Much of the basin is now part of the Mount Baker–Snoqualmie National Forest and its Alpine Lakes Wilderness. It is used for various recreational purposes, alongside some quartz mining. A portion of the river was declared part of the National Wild and Scenic Rivers System in 2014.

== Course ==
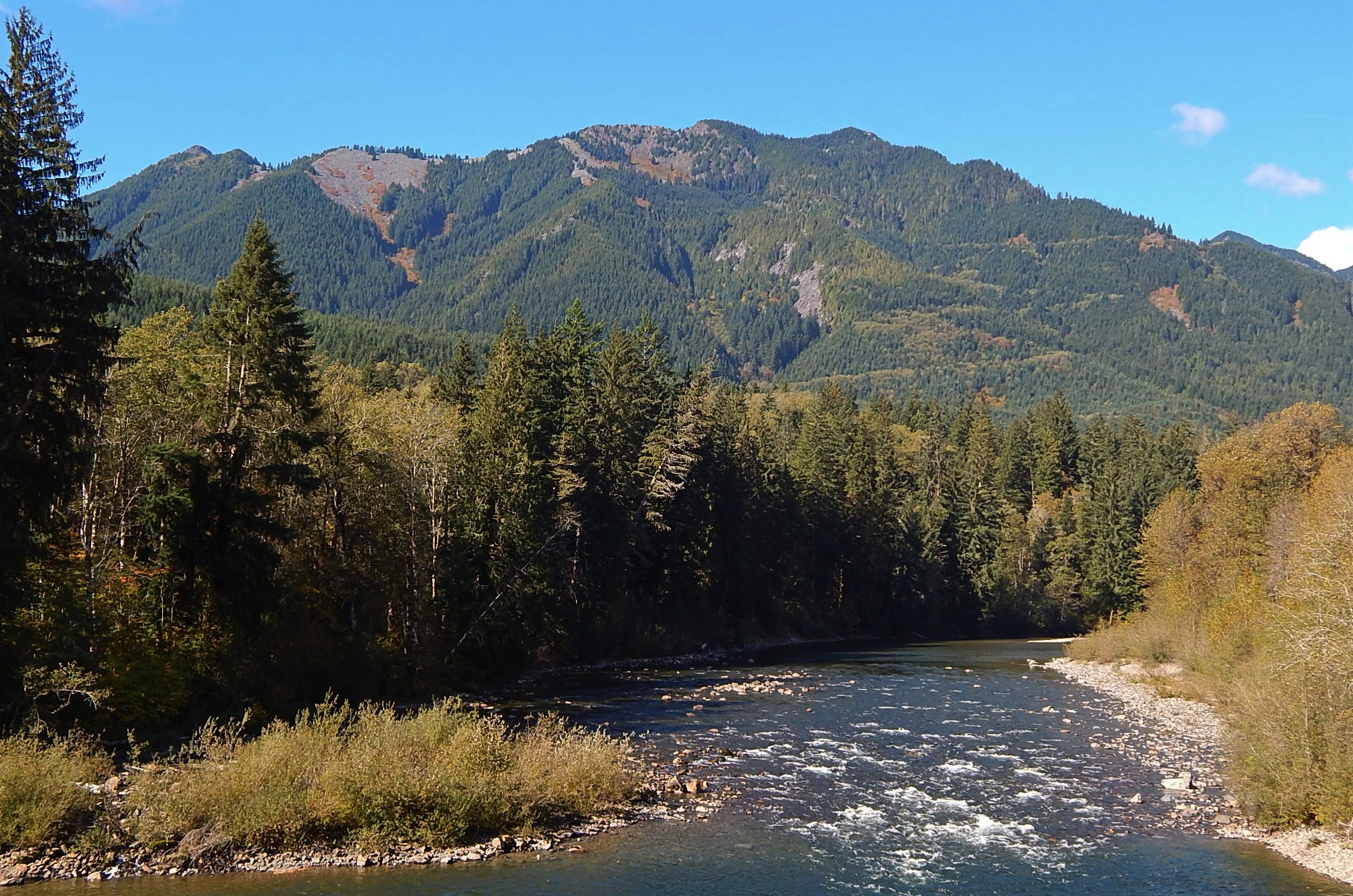
Green Mountain as seen across the Middle Fork Snoqualmie

The Middle Fork Snoqualmie River flows through about 35 miles (56 km) of the Cascade Range of western Washington, in the Pacific Northwest of the United States. Its headwaters are at the crest of the Cascade Range near La Bohn Gap, a mountain pass adjacent to La Bohn Peak, about 50 miles (80 km) east of Seattle. For the first 15 miles (24 km) of its course, it flows west through a narrow channel with bedrock on either side. It runs through a relatively straight course but has some braided channels, likely from sediment deposited by various fast-flowing tributary streams running down from the mountains. At it passes north of Snoqualmie Mountain, it receives Burnt Boot Creek as a tributary on its left bank.

About 15 miles (24 km) downstream from its source, the river's descent becomes much less steep and the valley widens, with channels ranging from 18 to 90 ft (5.5 to 27.4 m) in width. The Middle Fork Snoqualmie meanders to the southwest through the broadened valley with a relatively unconfined channel, featuring many riffles and pools. After it takes in the Taylor River, it turns to the southwest and receives its second major tributary, the Pratt River.

For the final 5.5 miles (8.9 km) of its course, it meanders through a large floodplain created by the confluences of the three forks of the Snoqualmie—the Middle Fork, the South Fork, and the North Fork. Various old, relict river channels are found across the area, increasing in frequency as the river gets closer to the confluence. This is the only section of the river with significant human modification, due to the presence of levees and other flood control structures. It meets the North Fork and the South Fork of the Snoqualmie near the town of North Bend, Washington, forming the mainstem Snoqualmie River. The Snoqualmie flows northwest over Snoqualmie Falls and eventually meets the Skykomish River north of the town of Duvall, Washington, forming the Snohomish River, which eventually discharges into the Puget Sound.

== Hydrology ==
The Middle Fork is the largest of the three forks of the Snoqualmie River. Its drainage basin covers 170.5 square miles (442 km^{2}) in area. Elevations in the basin range from 7,492 feet (2,284 m) above sea level at the summit of Mount Hinman to about 400 feet (120 m) at the Middle Forks' confluence with the South Fork Snoqualmie.

The river's substrate mainly consists of boulders, rubble, and bedrock in its upper reaches. As it descends, this transitions to banks of earth and rock with gravel and rubble between them. The final 4 miles (6.4 km) of its course contain various pools and riffles with a gravel and rubble substrate. The water quality of the river is generally quite high, although it exceeds temperature standards for portions of the year.

== Geology ==
The Middle Fork basin was heavily influenced by glacial activity during the Quaternary glaciation, with both local alpine glaciers and the Cordilleran ice sheet advancing into the valley during different portions of the Pleistocene. The continental ice sheet reached its greatest extent in western Washington around 17,000 years ago. It created an ice dam which blocked the Middle Fork and other Cascade rivers from flowing out to sea, resulting in the formation of a series of proglacial lakes across their river valleys. In the Middle Fork Valley, the glacier created terraces from meltout till, the material deposited at the foot of the ice dam. Other terraces and moraines were created as outwash plains as the ice sheet began to recede.

As the glaciers retreated, the large Glacial Lake Snoqualmie formed. The lake would rapidly decrease in surface elevation whenever the glacial retreat allowed access to a new, lower valley, while staying constant between these events. As the lake level fell, the Middle Fork eroded an incision into an embankment which blocked the outlet of its valley. Another set of terraces were likely created after the opening of the Raging River valley as a spillway.

In the eastern, upland portions of the basin, the rock is generally hard igneous bedrock, with erosion-resistant granitic rocks. Much of the area between the North and South Forks consists of andesite, breccia, and tuff overlying mélange, a jumbled formation of breccia. This mélange stretches in a belt across the western portions of the Middle Fork's watershed to Mount Si.

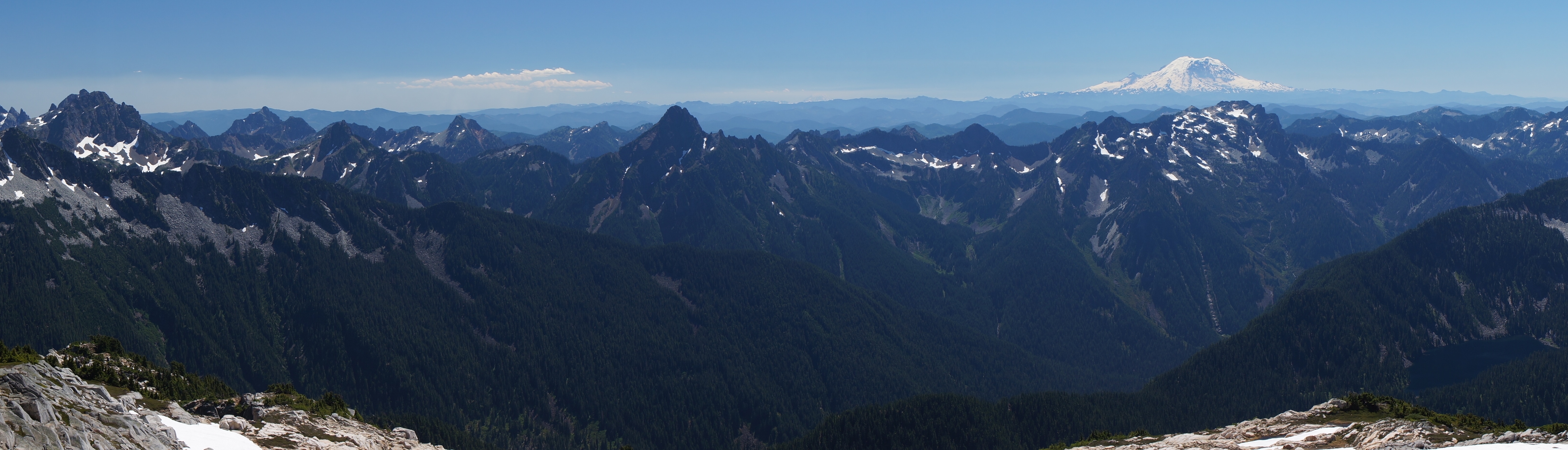
The upper basin of the Middle Fork Snoqualmie as seen from Big Snow Mountain. Mount Rainier is visible in the distance.

== Biology ==
Mammals such as elk, black-tailed deer, mountain goats, black bears, and beavers are found in the Middle Fork watershed. The river is an important habitat for harlequin ducks and spotted owls. During the summer, elk graze in the upland portions of the river basin. Bats likely forage in wetland areas of the river, as well as the upland Williams Lake. The Tulalip Tribes have led an initiative to relocate "nuisance" beavers into the Middle Fork Snoqualmie valley, which may help to restore wetlands in the area.

Trout are frequently found in the Middle Fork, including cutthroat trout, rainbow trout, brook trout, and rainbow trout/cutthroat trout hybrids. Freshwater sculpins are also found in all three Snoqualmie forks, while mountain whitefish are found across the Middle Fork and the lower portions of the other two forks. Fish in the Snoqualmie forks have been cut off from the downstream watershed and ocean since the last glacial period, due to the presence of Snoqualmie Falls. Genetic testing has shown that cutthroat trout in the mainstem of the river and the Middle Fork are genetically distinct groups.

Western hemlock and Sitka spruce are found throughout the river basin, with old-growth western hemlock trees present in small pockets. The upland forests in the basin also contain conifers such as douglas fir, western red cedar, and grand fir, as well as deciduous trees such as red alder, black cottonwood, and big-leaf maple. Other areas contain various grasses, weeds, and wildflowers, as well as shrubs such as hazelnut, Himalayan blackberry, Scotch broom, and snowberry. Platanthera orbiculata, a conservationally-sensitive orchid species, is found across the basin.

In the wetlands around the river basin, red alders, black cottonwood, Sitka spruce, and western red cedar dominate, existing alongside shrubs such as Spiraea and willows, as well as smaller plants such as sedges, rushes, and reed canary grass. Water lilies and smartweeds are found in aquatic beds in the wetlands.

== History ==
Indigenous peoples have been living in the vicinity of the river for thousands of years. Some members of the Muckleshoot, Puyallup, Snoqualmie, Tulalip, and Yakama nations have ancestral links to groups who resided in the area. There are no known archaeological sites or major cultural properties in the river's basin, although groups made use of the basin's resources. Prior to colonization, a Snoqualmie village called Tutswa'dEb was located between the Middle and South Forks. Tribal members continued to hunt in the Middle Fork watershed, as their right to continue hunting and fishing in the area was protected by the 1855 Treaty of Point Elliott. Exercise of treaty rights such as hunting in the area has slowed since the late 20th century, due to habitat degradation and increased recreational use. Native groups in the area made use of fire to maintain open areas for foraging, as well as grazing by wild animals. Larger wildfires occurred periodically in the river valley, with especially large fires estimated to occur in the 12th and 16th centuries AD, as well as a smaller wildfire in the lowland areas in 1701.

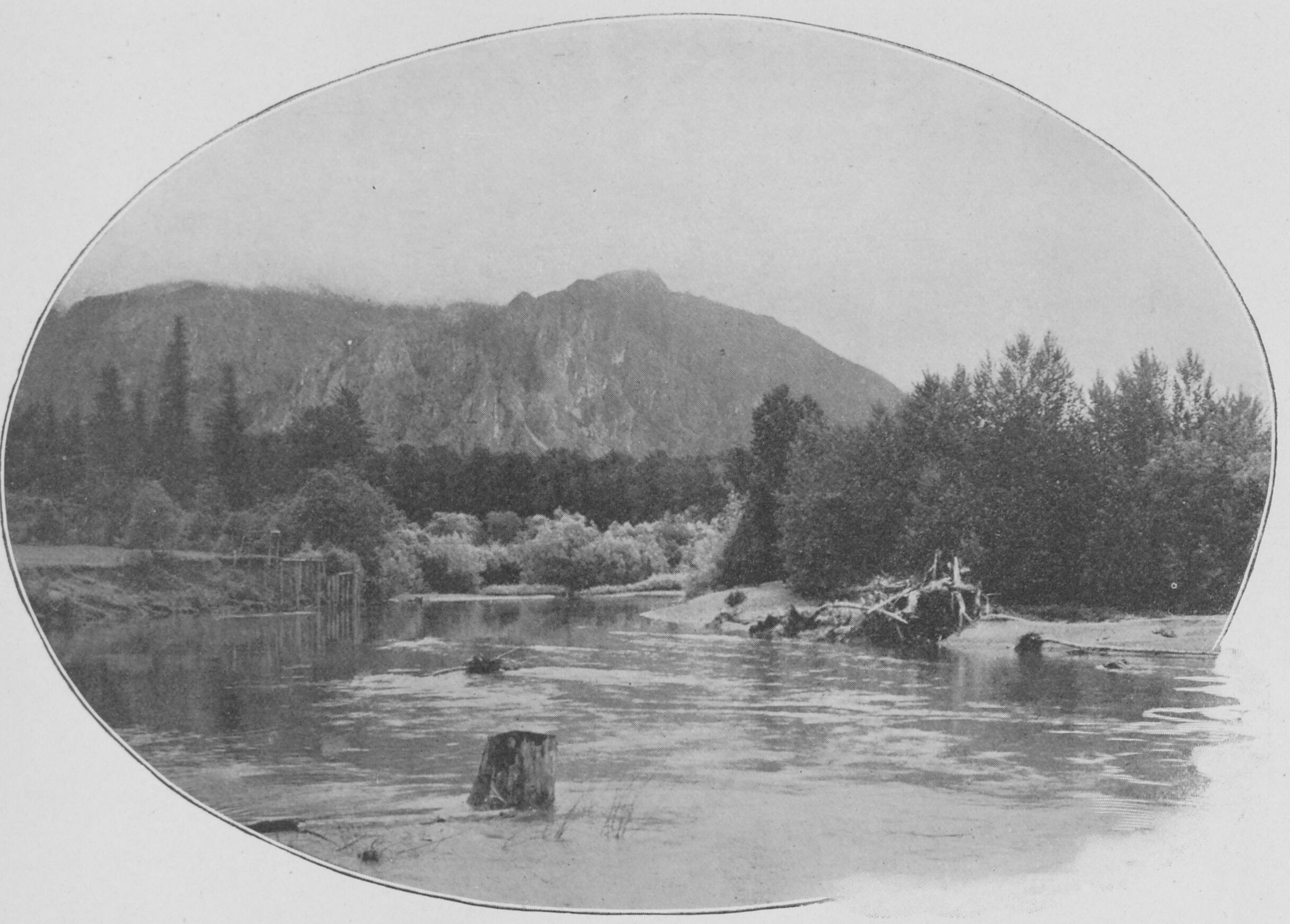
Mount Si as seen from the Middle Fork Snoqualmie, 1904

The first Euro-American settlers arrived in the Snoqualmie Valley in 1858. Near the forks of the Snoqualmie, the townsite of what would become North Bend was platted in 1889, and incorporated as a town twenty years later. Logging began to impact the region in the late 19th century. A wide area of the valley, now part of Mount Baker–Snoqualmie National Forest, was designated as the Pacific Forest Reserve in 1893. It became part of the Mount Rainier Forest Reserve in 1897, which allowed settlement, mining, agriculture, and logging. Logging records are inconsistent and inaccurate, as logging not registered with the United States Forest Service was frequently observed. From 1900 to 1938, about 3,333 acres (5.2 sq mi) of timber was harvested along its course, with another 2,841 acres (4.4 sq mi) harvested along the Pratt River from 1900 to 1948. Between 1923 and 1939, the North Bend Lumber Company and North Bend Timber Company operated railroads and logging camps in the area to harvest and transport timber. The railroad tracks were removed in 1941, and their remains were largely destroyed by road-based logging operations. Logging was mainly limited to lowland areas of the river during the 1920s and 1930s before expanding to higher elevation tributaries. Activity peaked in the 1940s and has declined since.

A smaller area of about 117 acres (0.2 sq mi) was harvested along the Middle Fork Snoqualmie around the 1970s and 1980s. The last lumber mill in North Bend closed in the 1980s. A 2022 Forest Service report notes that the affected areas of forest "will not reach maturity for years and possibly centuries". This reduced forest coverage has led to a greater bankfull width (the greatest width a stream could reach without overflowing its banks), and alongside climate change effects has led to increased temperatures in the basin. The remains of some homesteads and ranger stations are found along the Middle Fork. The Taylor River Ranger Station was found to meet the criteria for inclusion in the National Register of Historic Places, but was last recorded in 1986, and has since been overtaken by the forest.

Following a major flood of the Snohomish River in 1959, the Army Corps of Engineers began to investigate flood control methods across the river's watershed. A 1969 report by the Corps recommended the construction of a major flood control dam on the Middle Fork Snoqualmie, which was met with strong public opposition due to its environmental effects. Governor Daniel J. Evans rejected the proposed dam in 1973. In 2015, the state government funded enhancements to trails across the river valley as part of the Mountains to Sound Greenway program.

=== Modern land use ===
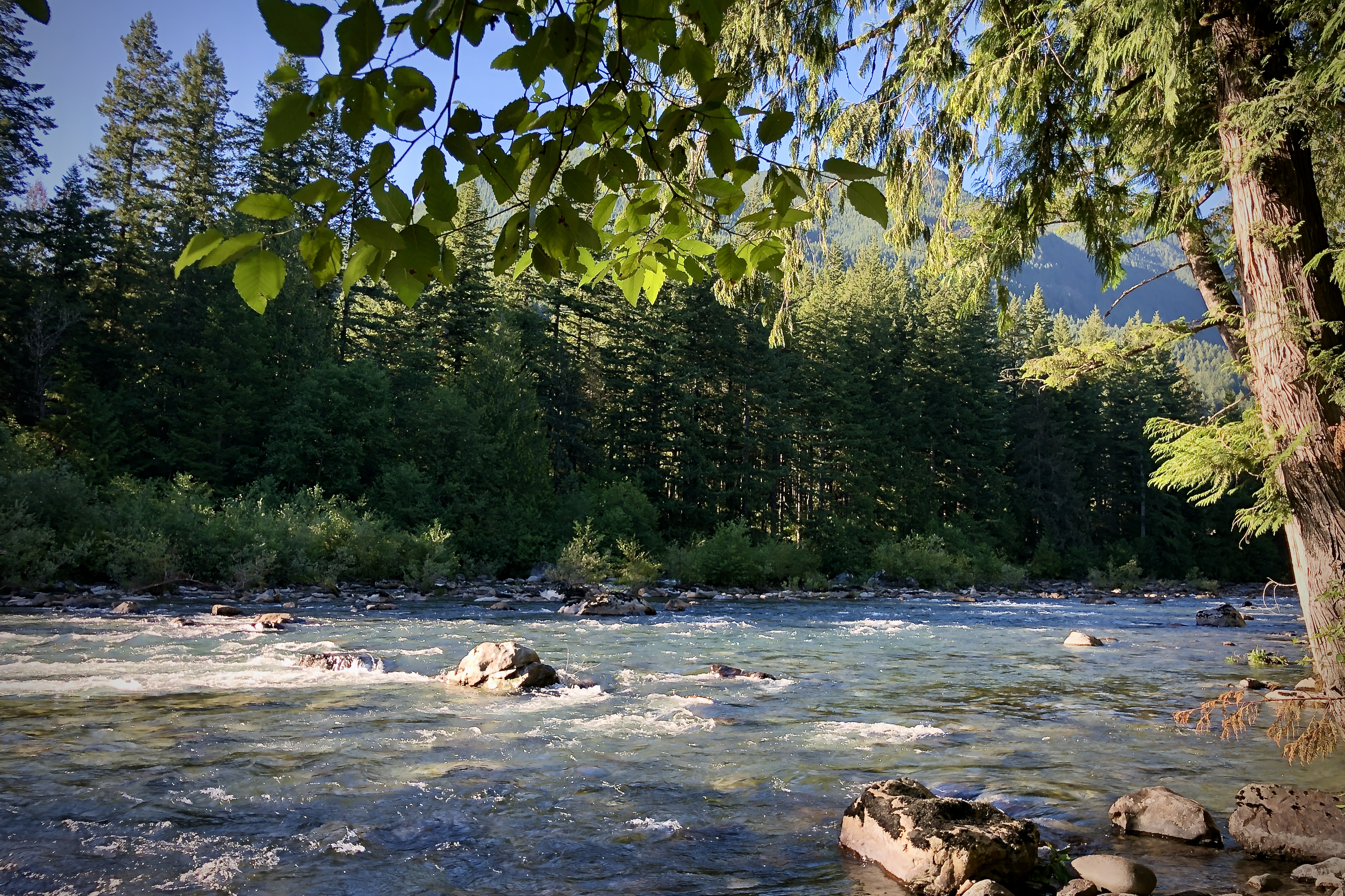
Much of the area around the river is in the Mount Baker–Snoqualmie National Forest.

Large portions of land surrounding the river are within the Mount Baker–Snoqualmie National Forest. The Washington State Department of Natural Resources (WDNR) administers 97 acres (39 ha) of area around to the southeast of the river as part of the Middle Fork Snoqualmie Natural Resources Conservation Area (NRCA), established in 2011 from state trust lands. Most of the upper portions of the watershed, and about 47% of the total watershed, are within the protected Alpine Lakes Wilderness, first established in 1976. Outside of the Wilderness Area, land use is split between timberlands and recreational areas, with a mix of public and private ownership. The lower watershed, outside of the area adjacent to the city of North Bend, is mostly WDNR-owned timberlands, alongside a portion of the Mount Si NRCA.

Twenty-two federal mining claims are extant in the upper valley of the river, generally focused on collecting minerals such as high-quality quartz.

Since the 1990s, land management in the Middle Fork watershed has focused on habitat restoration and recreational use. Various spur forest roads and culverts in the area were decommissioned after a 2005 report, in order to combat illegal dumping and off-road vehicle use. In December 2014, federal legislation designated a portion of the Middle Fork Snoqualmie as part of the National Wild and Scenic Rivers System (NWSRS). Starting at its headwaters, the first 6.4 miles (10.3 km) of its course are classified as "Wild" under the system's criteria, and the following 21 miles (34 km) are classified as "Scenic". The "Wild" section is located entirely within the Alpine Lakes Wilderness. From 2017 to 2019, an estimated 1,128 visitors came to the "Wild" section annually, while different portions of the scenic section saw between 16,104 and 97,968 annual visitors.

The river and its basin are used for various recreational purposes, such as whitewater boating, catch and release fishing (often for cutthroat trout), and horseback riding. A privately-owned hot springs is located on one of its tributaries, Burntboot Creek. The Dutch Miller Gap Trail runs along the river corridor to its headwaters. The popularly-used Middle Fork Trail also runs by the river, fording over several creeks. Many dispersed camping sites are located along two forest service roads which run through the basin, leading to some littering and tree damage. Dispersed campsites on the trails running through the area show relatively little environmental impact.
