= Jerry Kanim =

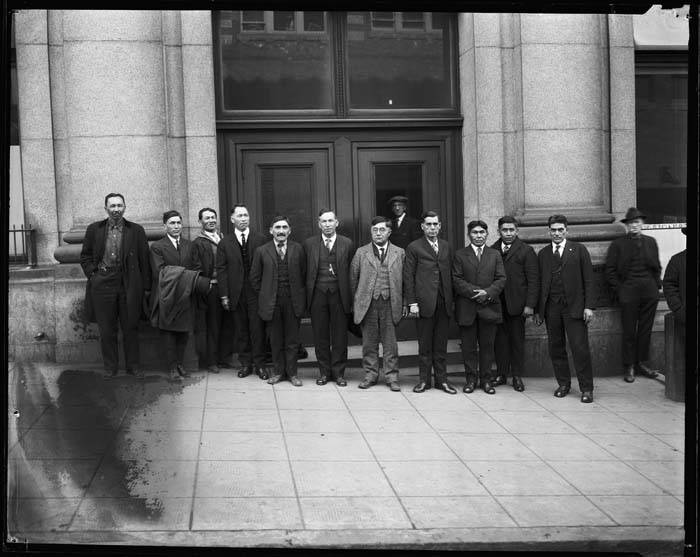
- Chief Jerry Kanim (with arms crossed in front) and a delegation at the Seattle courthouse.
- Born: 1869
- Died: February 1956 (aged 86–87); Fall City, Washington
- Occupation: Native American Chief
- Spouse: Jennie Hern Kanim
- Children: 1

Jerry Kanim was a chief of the Snoqualmie people from 1914 until his death in 1956. Chief Jerry Kanim was the most influential and most recognized political figure of the Snoqualmie in the 20th century. Kanim was appointed chief of his people in 1914 and was not replaced as chief until Earnest Barr was chosen 30 years later, after his death in 1956. Kanim was active in pursuing land claims and fishing rights as well as financial and real estate compensation on behalf of the Snoqualmie. He also was an advocate of information about the history and traditions of his people, frequently providing replicas of folkloric artifacts for anthropologists. Chief Jerry Kanim was the nephew of Chief Patkanim, one of the signers of the Treaty of Point Elliott. He lived with the Sauk-Suiattle Indian Tribe of Washington near the city of Darrington.

== Legacy ==
Chief Kanim public middle school in Fall City, Washington is named after Chief Jerry Kanim. Kanim Falls and Lake Kanim in the heart of the Alpine Lakes Wilderness and Kanim creek, in Sammamish are all named after him.
