= Coney Lake (King County, Washington) =

Lake in King County, Washington, US

- Location within Washington (state) Location within the United States
- Location: King County, Washington, United States
- Coordinates: 47.6669°N 121.4637°W
- Primary outflows: Coney Creek
- Basin countries: United States
- Surface elevation: 5,164 ft (1,574 m)

Coney Lake is a small alpine lake located in the Alpine Lakes Wilderness in King County, Washington. Coney Lake sits in a bowl formed by a rocky double cliff bifurcation of the south ridge of Lennox Mountain that connects to Coney's Cones-South Peak. Coney Lake is the origin of Coney Creek, which is a tributary of the west fork of Miller River. Lake Kanim is situated over the opposite side of the ridge as Lennox Mountain splits towards Canoe Peak.

Coney Creek exits down over 1000 feet to a cirque making a waterfall that hugs a crevice along the cliff face of the south skirt of Lennox Mountain.

== See also ==
- List of lakes of the Alpine Lakes Wilderness
