= Snoqualmie Mountain =

Mountain in Washington (state), United States

Coordinates: 47°27′31″N 121°24′59″W

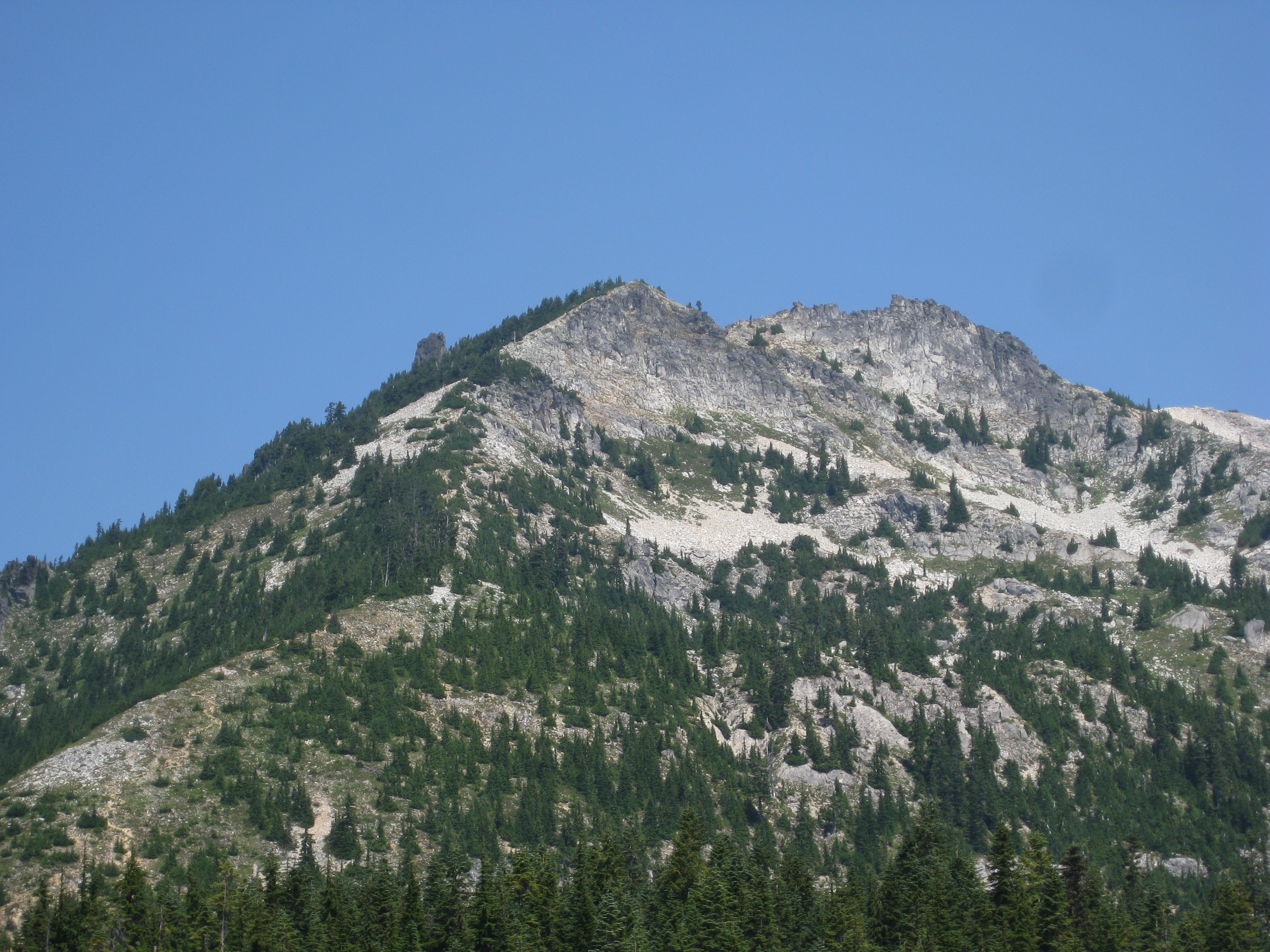

Highest point
- Elevation: 6,270 ft (1,910 m)

Naming
- English translation: People of the moon
- Language of name: Coast Salish
- Pronunciation: /snoʊˈkwɑːlmiː/

Geography
- Location: King County, Washington, U.S.
- Parent range: Cascade Range
- Topo map: USGS Snoqualmie Pass

Climbing
- Easiest route: South ridge via Cave Ridge

Snoqualmie Mountain is the tallest peak in the immediate vicinity of Snoqualmie Pass in the North Cascade Range of Washington state, U.S. Its shape is often described as "amorphous" or "blob-like", although it does display a steep north face dropping down to the Middle Fork of the Snoqualmie River. The boundary of the Alpine Lakes Wilderness crosses the summit of Snoqualmie Mountain.

== Routes ==
The south ridge, ascending from Cave Ridge between Snoqualmie Peak and Guye Peak, is a non-technical hike. To reach Cave Ridge, either ascend from just south of the Snow Lake trailhead near Alpental to the west, or ascend from the Commonwealth Basin to the east. Expect to take 4 hours to reach the summit. The first recorded ascent was by Albert H. Sylvester in 1897 or 1898.
