= Franklin Falls =

Waterfall in Washington (state), United States

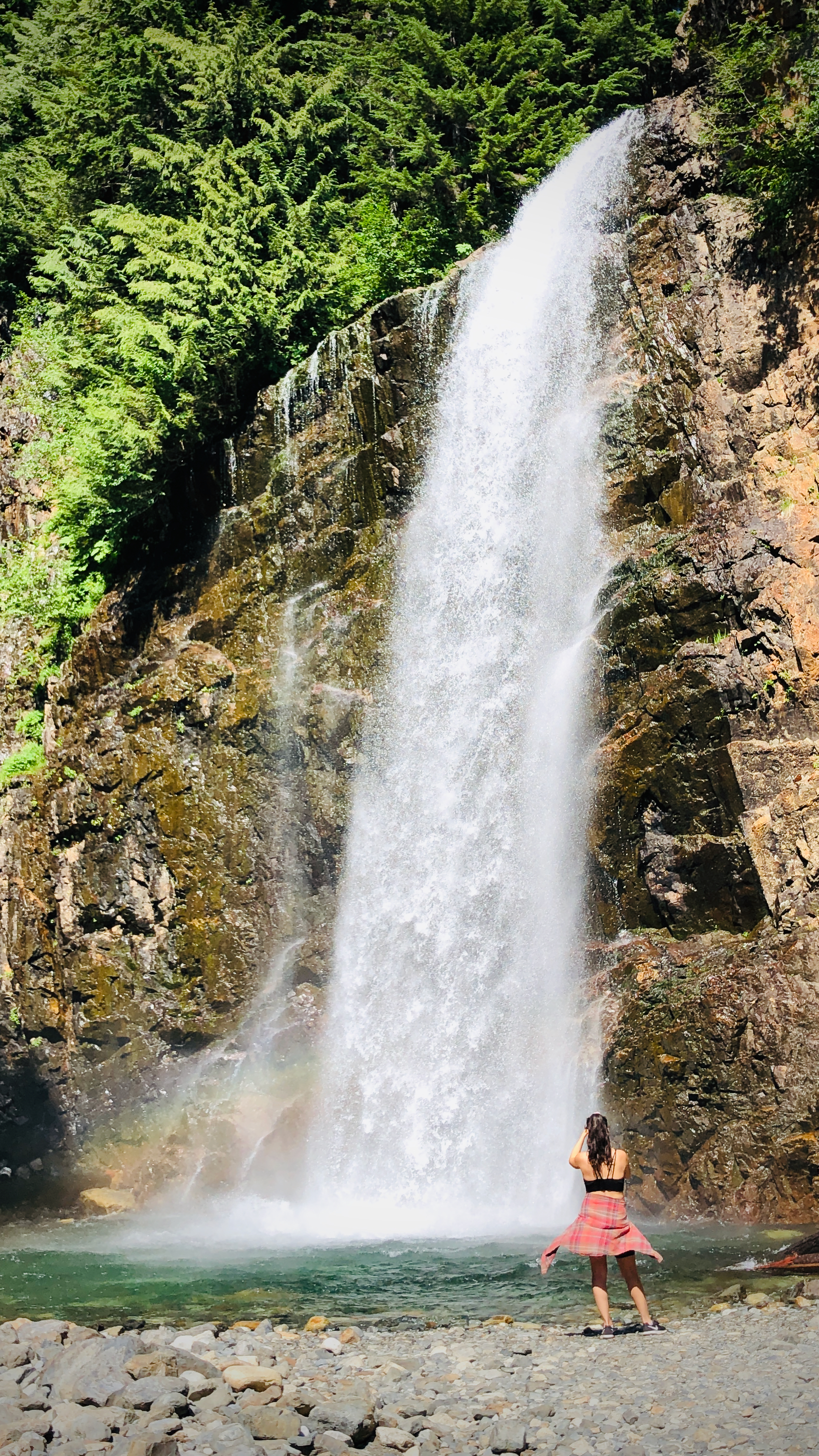
- Franklin Falls
- Interactive map of Franklin Falls
- Location: about 18 miles east of North Bend, Washington
- Coordinates: 47.42497°N 121.43243°W
- Type: Tiered
- Total height: 135 ft (41 m)
- Number of drops: 3
- Average width: 25 ft (7.6 m)
- Watercourse: South Fork Snoqualmie River

Franklin Falls is the first of three major waterfalls on the South Fork Snoqualmie River. The other two downriver falls are Weeks Falls and Twin Falls. Franklin Falls are located near Snoqualmie Pass in King County, Washington, United States, between the north and south lanes of Interstate 90, just east of exit 47. The falls actually consist of three tiers, totaling 135 feet (41 m). The first drop is a very scenic 15-foot (4.6 m) block-shaped fall. The second drop is a 25-foot (7.6 m) fanning cascade. The final drop begins as a 25-foot slide, which bends to the right, then plunges over the final 70-foot (21 m) drop seen from the base of the falls. The falls are popular canyoneering destination. The upper two drops are north of the freeway.

The trails to the falls were closed in 2025 due to budget cuts, but have since reopened.
