= Snoqualmie River =

River in northwest Washington, United States

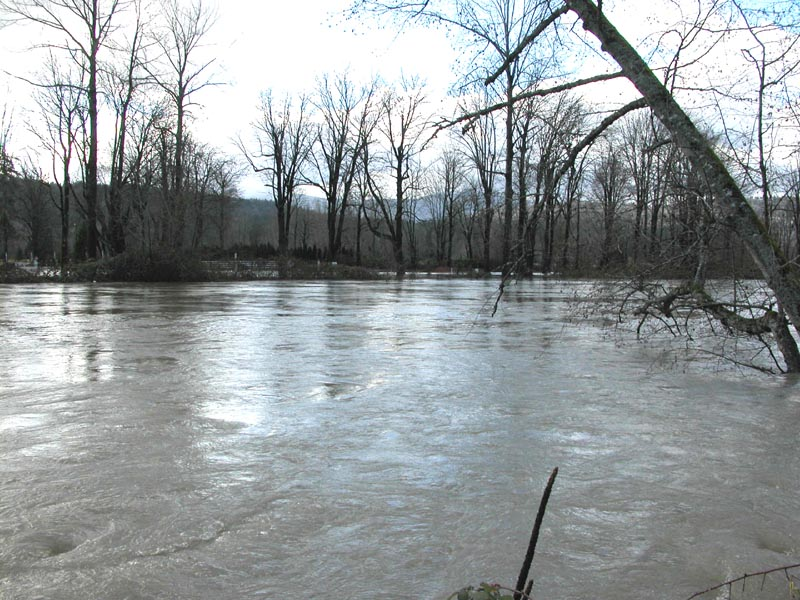
- Snoqualmie River flooding several miles below Snoqualmie Falls in December 2004

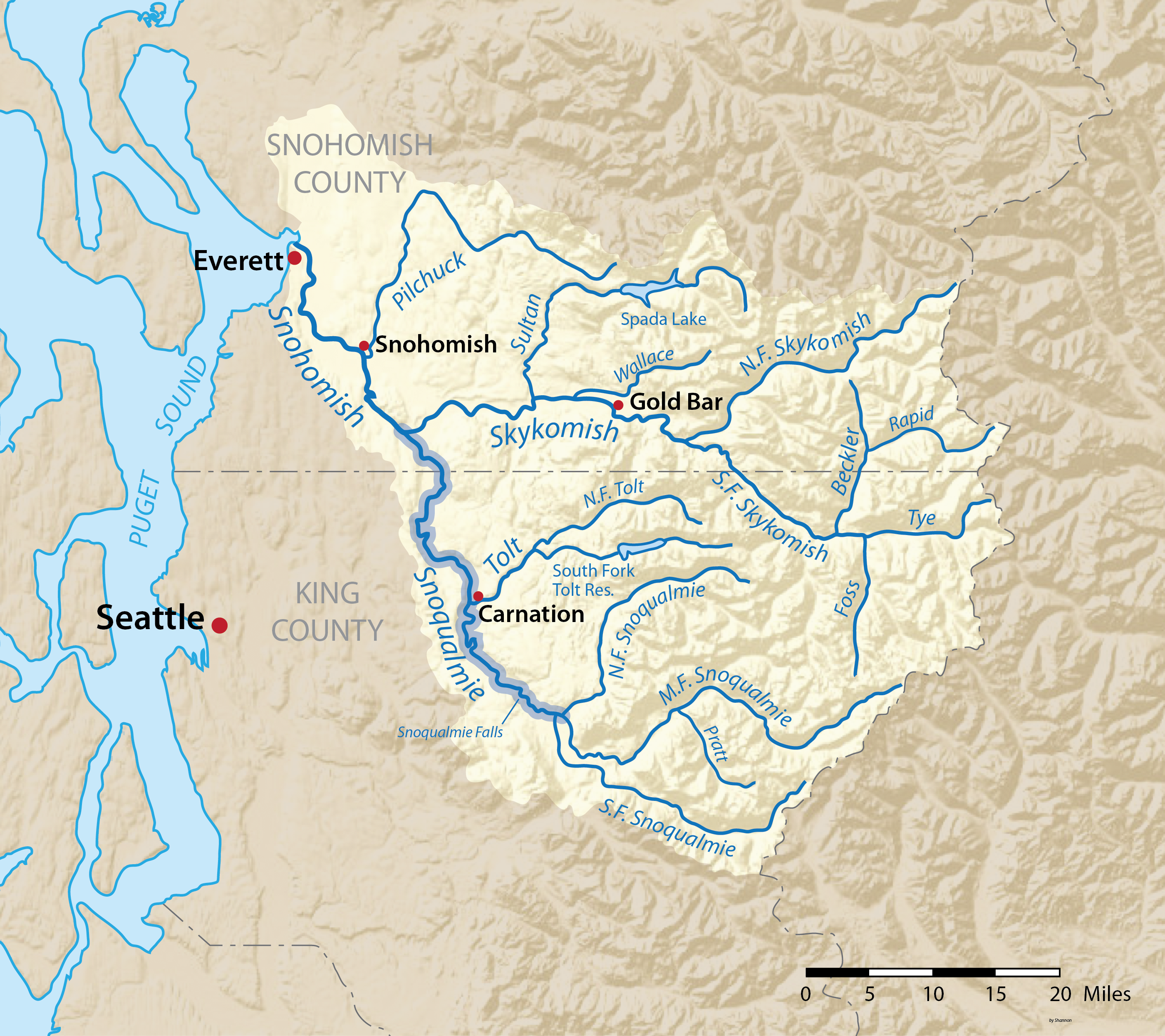
- Map of the Snoqualmie River highlighted in the Snohomish River watershed

- Location of the mouth of the Snoqualmie River in Washington Snoqualmie River (the United States)

Location
- Country: United States
- State: Washington
- Counties: King, Snohomish

Physical characteristics
- Source: Confluence of the Middle and North Forks
  - coordinates: 47°31′15″N 121°46′33″W
- Mouth: Snohomish River
  - coordinates: 47°49′11″N 122°1′45″W
- Length: 45 mi (72 km)
- Discharge
  - location: USGS gage 12149000 near Carnation
  - average: 3,710 cu ft/s (105 m^{3}/s)
  - minimum: 341 cu ft/s (9.7 m^{3}/s)
  - maximum: 54,500 cu ft/s (1,540 m^{3}/s)

Basin features
- Tributaries
  - left: Raging River, South Fork, Middle Fork
  - right: Tolt River, North Fork

National Wild and Scenic River
- Official name: Snoqualmie (Middle Fork)
- Type: Wild, Scenic
- Designated: December 19, 2014

The Snoqualmie River is a 45-mile (72 km) long river in King County and Snohomish County in the U.S. state of Washington. The river's three main tributaries are the North, Middle, and South Forks, which drain the west side of the Cascade Mountains near the town of North Bend and join near the town of Snoqualmie just above the Snoqualmie Falls. After the falls the river flows north through rich farmland and the towns of Fall City, Carnation, and Duvall before meeting the Skykomish River to form the Snohomish River near Monroe. The Snohomish River empties into Puget Sound at Everett. Other tributaries of the Snoqualmie River include the Taylor River and the Pratt River, both of which enter the Middle Fork, the Tolt River, which joins at Carnation, and the Raging River at Fall City.

Many of the Snoqualmie River's headwaters originate as snowmelt within the Alpine Lakes Wilderness. On August 8, 2007, U.S. Representative Dave Reichert (WA-08), King County Executive Ron Sims, and others announced a proposal to expand the Alpine Lakes Wilderness to include the valley of the Pratt River, a tributary of the Middle Fork, near the town of North Bend. The proposal would also give the Pratt River National Wild and Scenic River status.

== South Fork ==
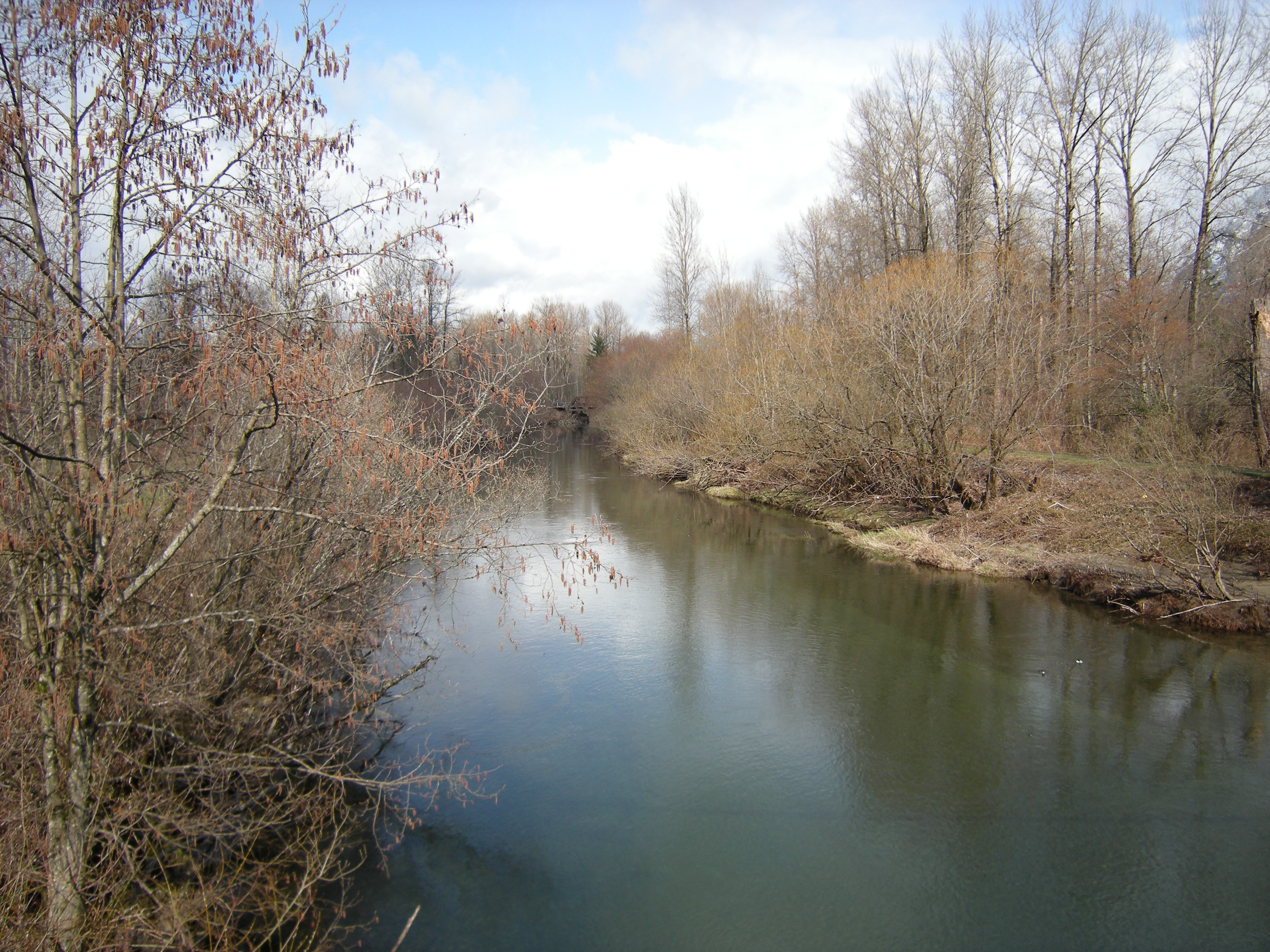
The South Fork Snoqualmie River, looking north from State Route 202 near North Bend

The South Fork, approximately 31 miles (50 km) long, begins at the outlet of tiny Source Lake, 47°27′18″N 121°27′9″W, and flows southeast before soon turning southwest and continuing to flow in that direction until after Denny Creek joins. It then flows west for a bit before turning northwest and continuing in that general direction until it merges with the Snoqualmie River Proper just above Snoqualmie Falls. It drops over a total of 6 waterfalls (many would argue 8 because many people divide the final one into three portions).

== Middle Fork ==
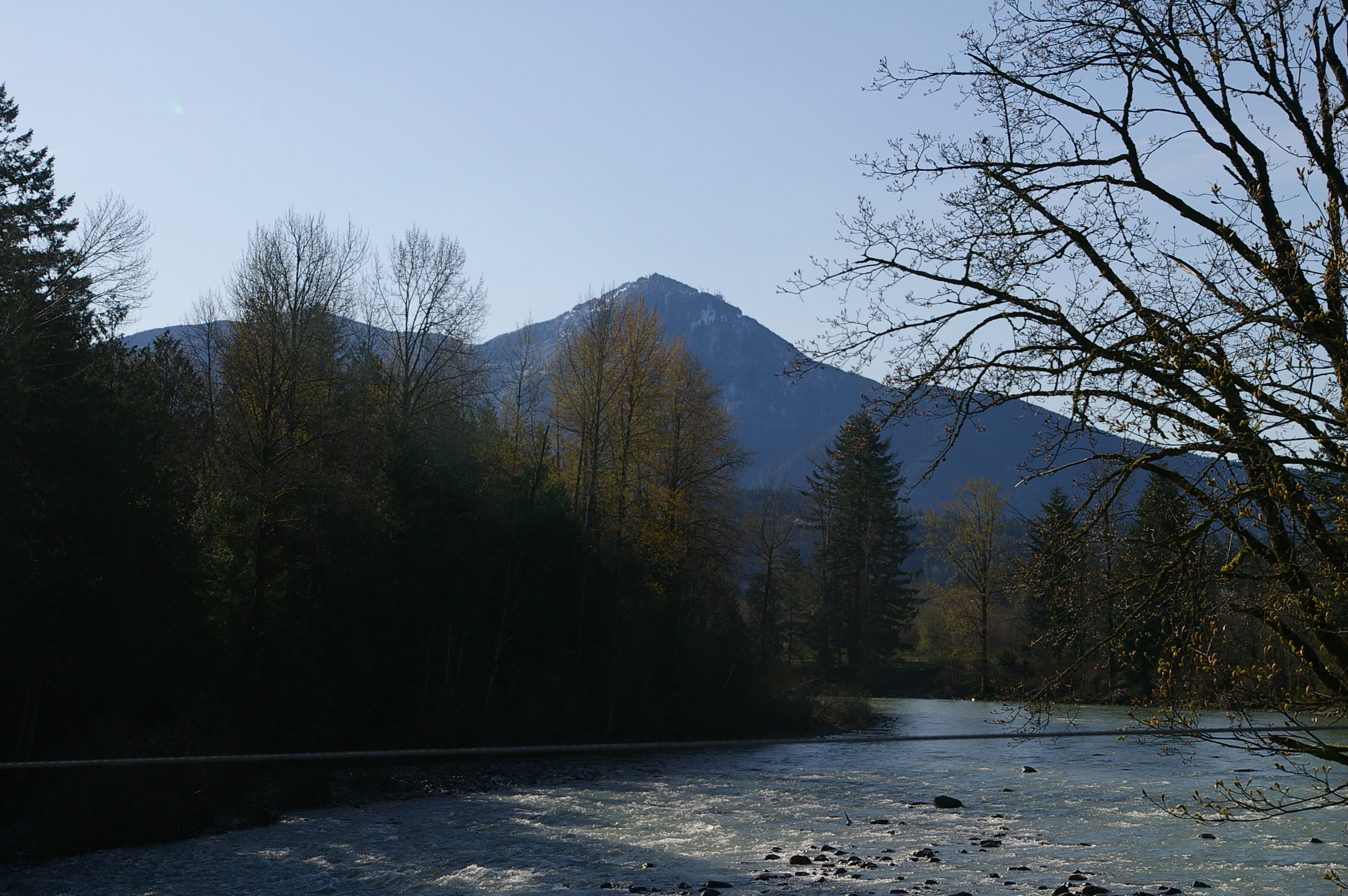
The Middle Fork Snoqualmie River near North Bend. Mt. Washington is in the background.

The Middle Fork, approximately 41 miles (66 km) long, originates from Chain Lakes, 47°33′30″N 121°14′15″W, and flows south to Williams Lake, then in a westerly direction until it meets with the North Fork near North Bend. It receives the waters of the Taylor River and the Pratt River in short order about halfway between its source and its mouth. It has one major waterfall along its course. The upper reaches of the Middle Fork, Taylor, and Pratt river valleys are within the boundaries of the Alpine Lakes Wilderness area.

The Middle Fork Valley is a popular recreational area since it is accessible during the winter due to its low altitude and close proximity to Seattle. For many years the Middle Fork Road extended 24 miles (39 km) to Hardscrabble Creek, but was gated at Dingford Creek in June 2007, 18 miles (29 km) in. The gate at Dingford Creek was a controversial part of the Access and Travel Management plan adopted by the US Forest Service in 2005. Much of the road's route is on the 1920s and 1930s era railroad grade of the North Bend Timber Company. The paved portion of the Middle Fork road was extended by 9.7 miles (15.6 km) during a 3-year construction project from 2014 to 2016, extending pavement to just before the Taylor River bridge. The Middle Fork Valley was heavily logged starting in 1923 and continued up through the 1970s. The obvious railroad grades, pilings, and related debris are from the North Bend Timber Company's activity from 1923 to 1941.

== North Fork ==
The North Fork, approximately 28 miles (45 km) long, originates at the outlet of small, rarely visited Lake Kanim, 47°39′41″N 121°28′58″W. Almost directly after exiting the lake it drops over Kanim Falls. The river then flows east before making a wide turn north. Just before its confluence with the Middle Fork the river flows through a canyon near Ernie's Grove. There are several waterfalls within this canyon including Fantastic Falls.

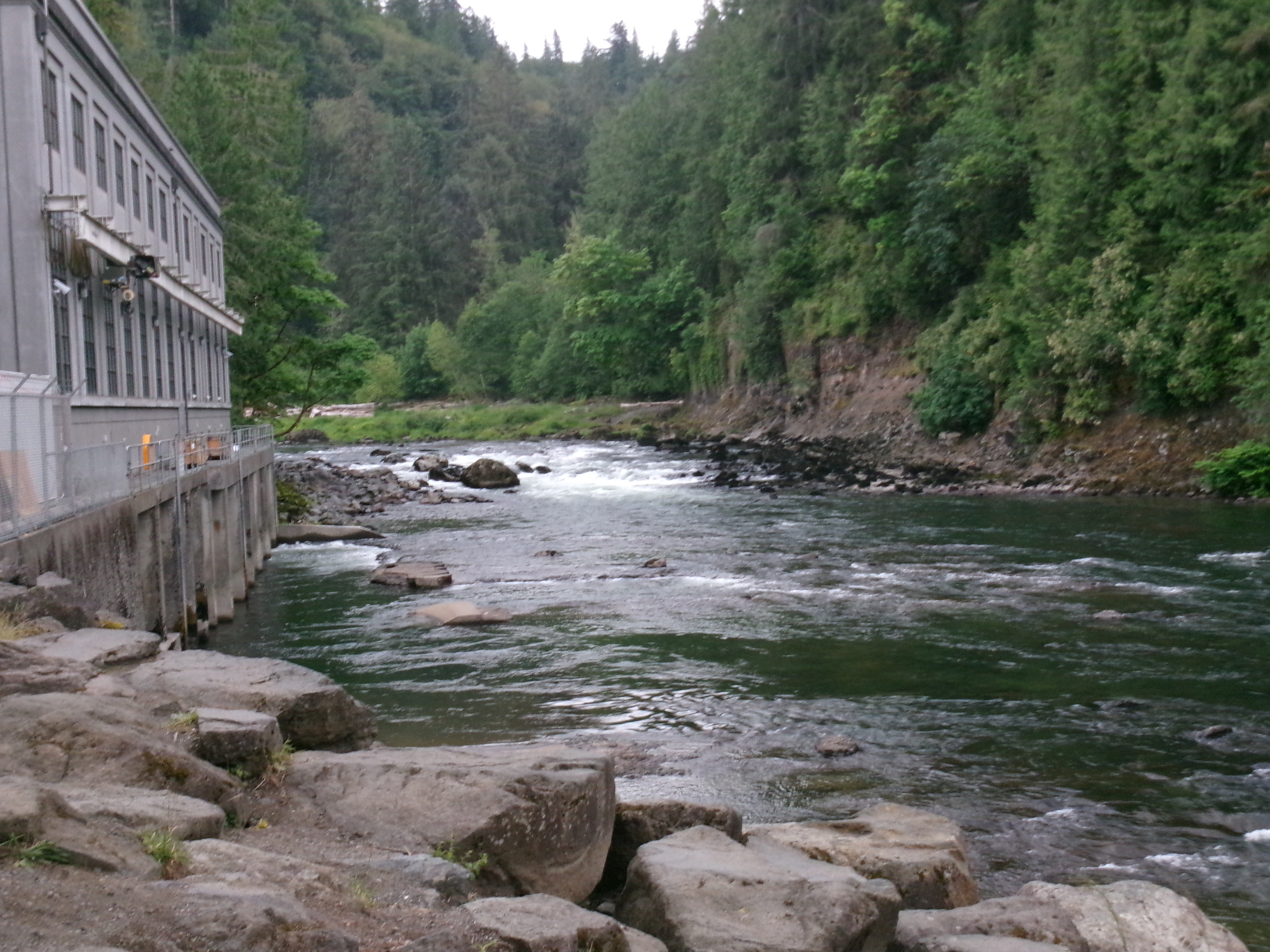
The Snoqualmie River flowing away from the bottom of Snoqualmie Falls

== Waterfalls ==
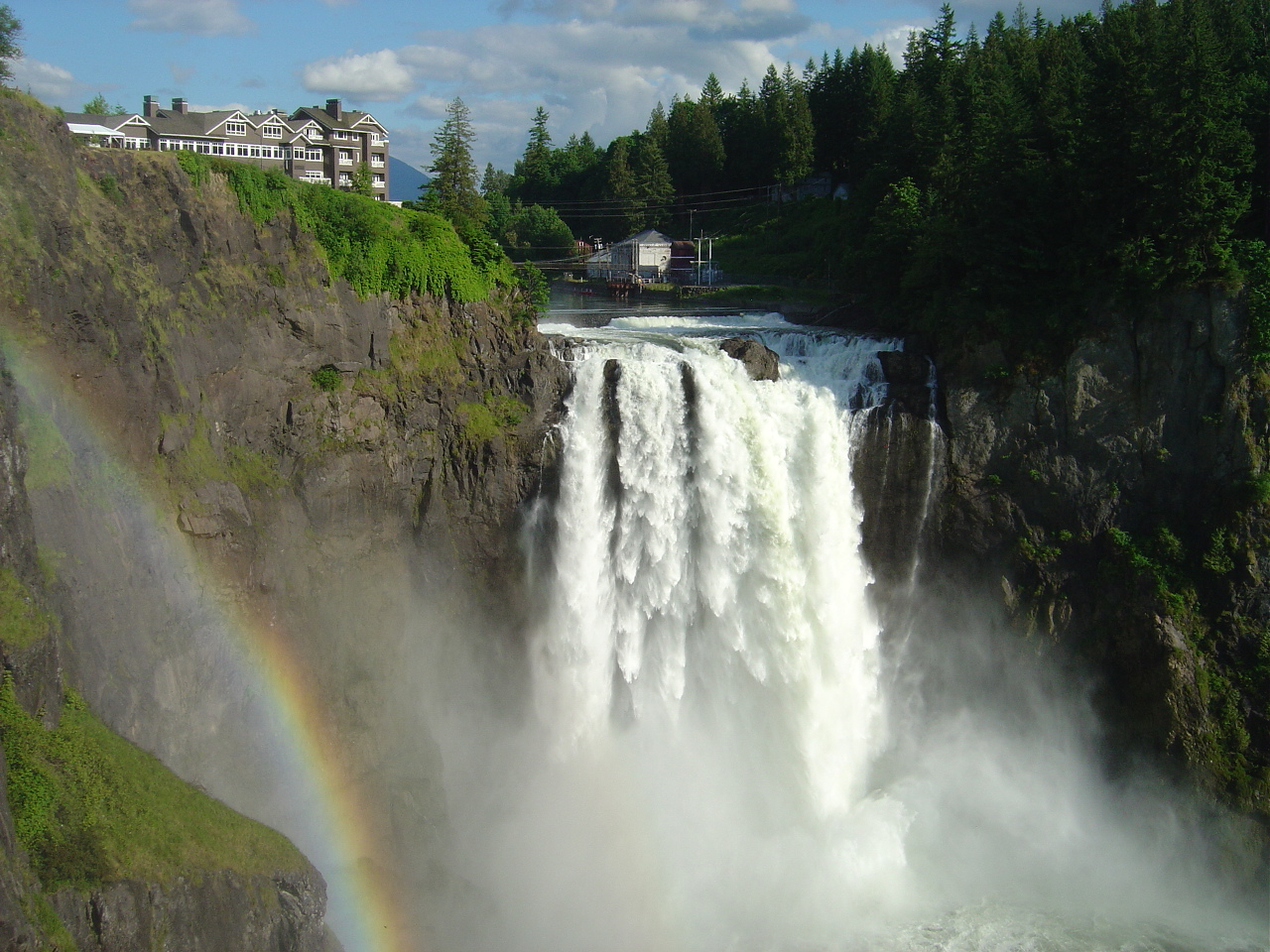
Snoqualmie Falls and Salish Lodge

The Snoqualmie River has quite a few major waterfalls. By far the most famous waterfall in Washington, receiving over 1 million visitors every year, is the 268-foot (82 m) high Snoqualmie Falls. However, the three forks of the upper Snoqualmie River also have notable waterfalls. The north fork has Fantastic Falls (35 ft) and Kanim Falls (200 ft). The middle fork has Nellie Falls (150 ft). And, the south fork has Twin Falls (135 ft), Middle Twin Falls, Upper Twin Falls, Weeks Falls, Upper Weeks Falls, Denny Camp Falls, Franklin Falls (135 ft), and Fall-into-the-Wall Falls (22 ft).

Snoqualmie Falls was featured on the television series Twin Peaks. Shots of upriver Snoqualmie also feature in some of the show's title sequences.

== Whitewater kayaking, canoeing and rafting ==
The Snoqualmie River has quite a few sections suitable for whitewater kayaking and rafting. It features run rate Class II to Class V+. The nearby Raging River also features a kayaking run.

== Flooding ==
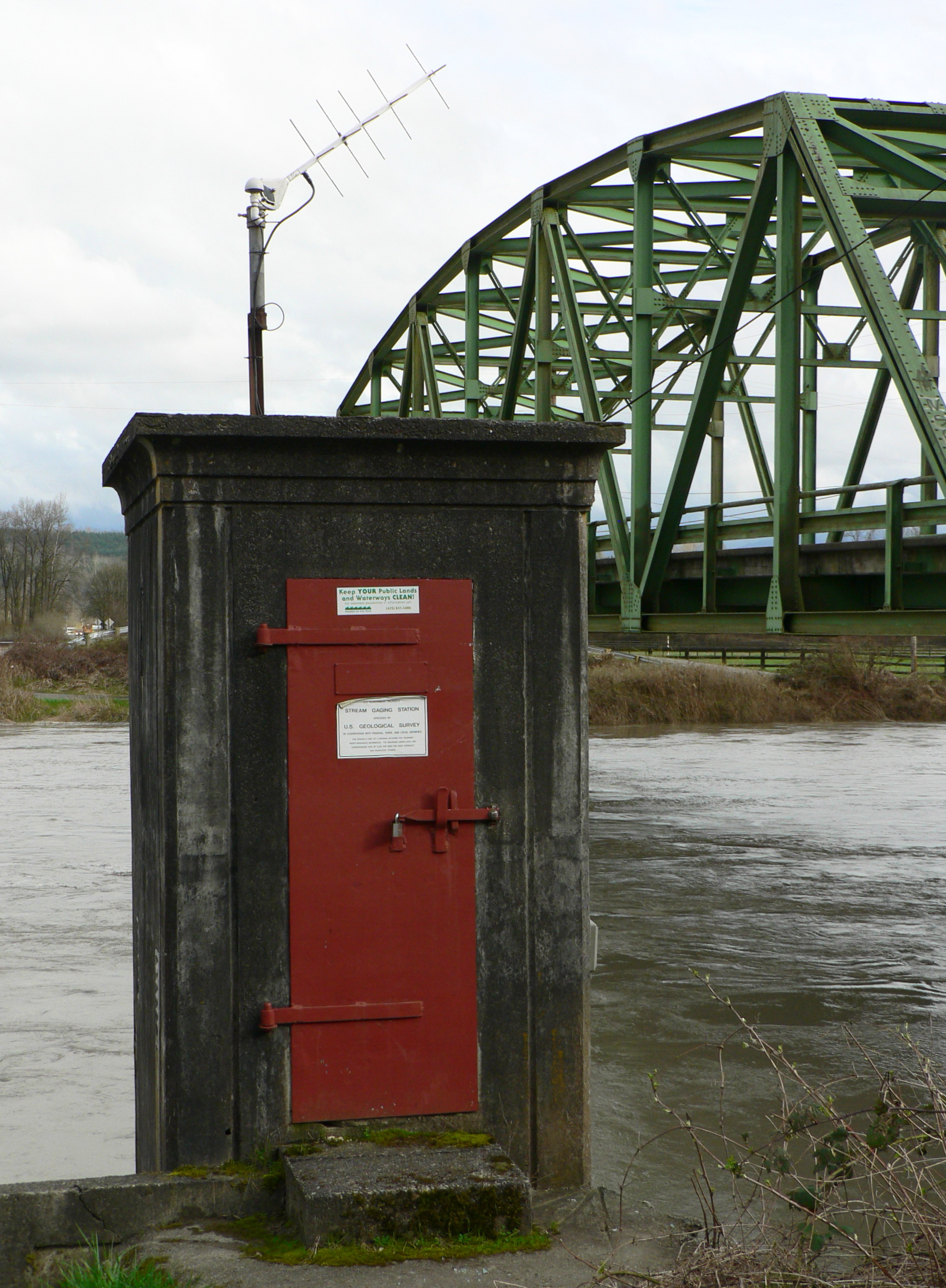
Stream Gaging Station, Carnation, during the March 13, 2007 flood

The Snoqualmie River is prone to flooding and typically sees multiple flood events annually that inundate local farmland and close low-lying roads. During record level floods, all road access to the towns of Carnation and Duvall becomes closed off. The last four times this happened were during the floods of 2020, 2009, 2006, and 1990.

The river level of the Snoqualmie River is monitored by six USGS streamgages, one on each fork, one just above the falls, one below Carnation, and one near Duvall. Data from the streamgages are used by the National Weather Service for flood forecasting and warning. The Tolt River and the Raging River are also monitored by USGS streamgages.

The Snoqualmie Flood Reduction Project was a controversial Army Corps of Engineers project completed in 2005 to reduce the effect of floods in the town of Snoqualmie by widening the river just above the falls.

== See also ==
- List of Washington rivers

=== Cities on the river ===
- North Bend, Washington
- Snoqualmie, Washington
- Fall City, Washington
- Carnation, Washington
- Duvall, Washington
