= Snoqualmie Bog Natural Area Preserve =

Protected area in Washington state, US

Coordinates: 47.662°N 121.620°W

Snoqualmie Bog Natural Area Preserve in King County, Washington, is part of the Washington Natural Areas Program. It preserves a sphagnum moss bog now rare in the Puget Sound basin, as well as a small strip of old-growth forest.
