= Kanim Falls =

- Interactive map of Kanim Falls
- Coordinates: 47.66171°N 121.48305°W
- Type: Horsetail
- Total height: 200 feet (61 m)
- Number of drops: 1
- Watercourse: North Fork Snoqualmie River

Kanim Falls (200 feet (61 m)) is the major waterfall on the North Fork of the Snoqualmie River. It is located at the outlet of Lake Kanim and is near the source of the North Fork of the Snoqualmie River. The falls were named after Chief Jerry Kanim who was the leader of Snoqualmie people.

== See also ==
- Snoqualmie River
