= Lennox Mountain =

Mountain in Washington (state), United States

- Location within Washington (state) Location within the United States

Highest point
- Elevation: 5,898 ft (1,798 m)
- Prominence: 2,054 ft (626 m)
- Coordinates: 47°40′04″N 121°28′23″W

Geography
- Location: King County, Washington state, U.S.
- Parent range: Cascade Range
- Topo map: USGS Grotto

Geology
- Rock type: Granite

Climbing
- First ascent: 1915
- Easiest route: Hiking Bare Mountain Trailhead

Lennox Mountain is an 5,898-foot (1,798 m) mountain summit located in King County of Washington state. Lennox mountain extends a ridge South towards Canoe peak making a bowl structure where Lake Kanim sits, the origin source of the North Fork of the Snoqualmie River. From Lennox Mountain a second ridge with rocky double cliffs is formed running East towards Coney's Cones-South Peak where the Coney Basin and Coney Lake sit which produces a tributary of the west fork of Miller River. Access to Lennox Mountain is from Bare Mountain trailhead which reaches Canoe Peak.

== See also ==
- List of peaks of the Alpine Lakes Wilderness
