= Lake Kanim =

Lake in Washington, United States

- Location within Washington (state) Location within the United States
- Location: King County, Washington, United States
- Coordinates: 47.6606°N 121.47992°W
- Primary outflows: North Fork of Snoqualmie River
- Basin countries: United States
- Surface elevation: 3,944 ft (1,202 m)

Lake Kanim is a set of small freshwater lakes located on a clif of the south skirt of Lennox Mountain, in King County, Washington. Lake Kanim is the nascent source of the North Fork of the Snoqualmie River. The lake and its accompanying waterfall were named after Jerry Kanim who was the leader of Snoqualmie people.

== Location ==
Lake Kanim sits in a bowl formed by a ridge that connects Lennox Mountain and Canoe Peak. Shortly after the outflow, the river plunges into 280 feet (85 m) Kanim Falls, the biggest waterfall of the North Fork Snoqualmie River. Bear Lakes and Bear Creek is a short distance south over Canoe Peak, while Coney Lake is to the east and Paradise Lakes, at the foot of Bare Mountain (5,200 feet (1,600 m)), is to the west of Lake Kanim.

== Mining ==
Lake Kanim is located in a prominent mining location. South of the lake, East of Canoe Peak is the Brooklyn claims. The mine is just above the Coney Mine on a ridge dividing the Miller River and the North Fork of the Snoqualmie River. The mine had two veins, 25' and 10' wide, with paystreaks 2'-4' wide. The Brooklyn claim on Money Creek is nearby. The ore reported includes chalcopyrites and pyrites.

== See also ==
- List of lakes of the Alpine Lakes Wilderness
