= Jim Ellis (King County activist) =

Lawyer and civic activist in King County, Washington

- Born: James Reed Ellis; August 5, 1921; Oakland, California, U.S.
- Died: October 21, 2019 (aged 98); Bellevue, Washington, U.S.
- Education: Yale University; University of Chicago; University of Washington
- Occupation: Lawyer
- Years active: 1952–2000s
- Known for: Civil activism
- Spouse: Mary Lou Earling (m. 1944–1983)

James Reed Ellis (August 5, 1921 – October 25, 2019) was a municipal bond lawyer and civic activist based in King County, Washington. Although he never sought or held elective office, at the time of his death the Seattle Times described him as "one of [Washington's] most visionary and successful civic leaders." Among the many projects for which he was a key leader were cleaning up Lake Washington, establishing King County Metro (the county's public transit system), and a series of ballot initiatives known collectively as Forward Thrust; he also founded the Mountains to Sound Greenway Trust. He was also a key proponent of lidding Interstate 5 to create Freeway Park (now officially Jim Ellis Freeway Park) and the adjacent Washington State Convention Center (now Seattle Convention Center).

== Family life ==
Ellis was born in Oakland, California in 1921. His parents were Hazel Reed Ellis (originally from Spokane, Washington) and Floyd Ellis (originally from Dayton, Washington. His father (although trained as a lawyer) worked in the import-export industry. He had two brothers, John (born 1923) and Robert (born 1928). After the birth of his brother Robert, the family moved to Seattle, where he attended John Muir Elementary School and Franklin High School.

In the summer of 1937, Ellis's father placed Jim (then age 15), Robert (age 13) and two dogs on five acres of wooded land that he had purchased near Preston, Washington along the Raging River. They were given a ton of groceries, and instructions on how to build a log cabin. They had a rough summer, but by the end of it they had bonded closely, and had a livable cabin that they improved over the next several years, and that Ellis continued to use into the 2000s.

Ellis moved back east to attend Yale University. When the U.S. entered World War II, Ellis enlisted into the Air Force; his brother Robert joined the Army. Ellis was told to complete his degree before reporting for duty; both brothers began active duty on the same day in March 1943. He married Mary Lou Earling November 18, 1944. He and Mary had first met in high school; she was from Alaska, and attended the private Bush School in Seattle while he was at Franklin. They reconnected in the summer of 1942, shortly after he graduated from Yale. At Mountain Home Air Force Base in Idaho, Ellis served as a weather forecaster; his wife trained as a pilot, with the intention of becoming a WASP, but the WASPs were disbanded before she could join.

Ellis was reportedly "devastated" when his brother Robert was killed in action near Trier, Germany in February 1945, and strongly considered volunteering for a combat role, but his wife convinced him to focus instead on what he could do to contribute to his community.

Jim and Mary Lou Ellis had four children: Robert Lee Ellis II (born 1946), Lynn Earling Erickson (born 1951), Steven Reed Ellis (born 1955), and Judy Ellis (1948-1970). Robert and Lynn are both teachers; Steven is a beekeeper and environmentalist. Judy died in a car crash; Mary Lou Ellis died in 1983 at the age of 62.

== Civic career ==
Ellis graduated from University of Washington law school in 1948 and joined the firm Preston, Thorgrimson and Horowitz, later Preston Gates & Ellis. In 1952, working with the King County–Seattle Municipal League, he led an unsuccessful effort to revise the King County Charter. In the wake of that failure, he focused on what could be done about the severe pollution of Lake Washington, the large King County lake that forms the eastern border of Seattle. That led to the creation of the regional, intergovernmental Municipality of Metropolitan Seattle, ancestor of today's King County Metro established by a referendum September 9, 1958. and to a successful clean up of the lake. Ellis served roughly two decades as general counsel for Metro.

Ellis founded the committee behind the Forward Thrust initiatives in 1968 and 1970, which netted some highway improvements but failed to get the required support for a regional rail-based transit system. In 1972 he led a successful effort to establish the countywide bus-based transit system that today carries the "Metro" name. In 1991 he founded the Mountains to Sound Greenway Trust which, since that time, has put together a set of linked trails across the county.

Ellis served twice in the early 1960s as president of the King County-Seattle Municipal League, chaired the metropolitan government committee of the American Bar Association, and served 12 years on the University of Washington Board of Regents. He turned down an offer from President Nixon to be the first head of the United States Environmental Protection Agency, and received a Jefferson Award for Public Service in 1976 and a lifetime achievement award from The American Lawyer in 2005.
