= Snoqualmie Valley School District =

School district in Washington, United States

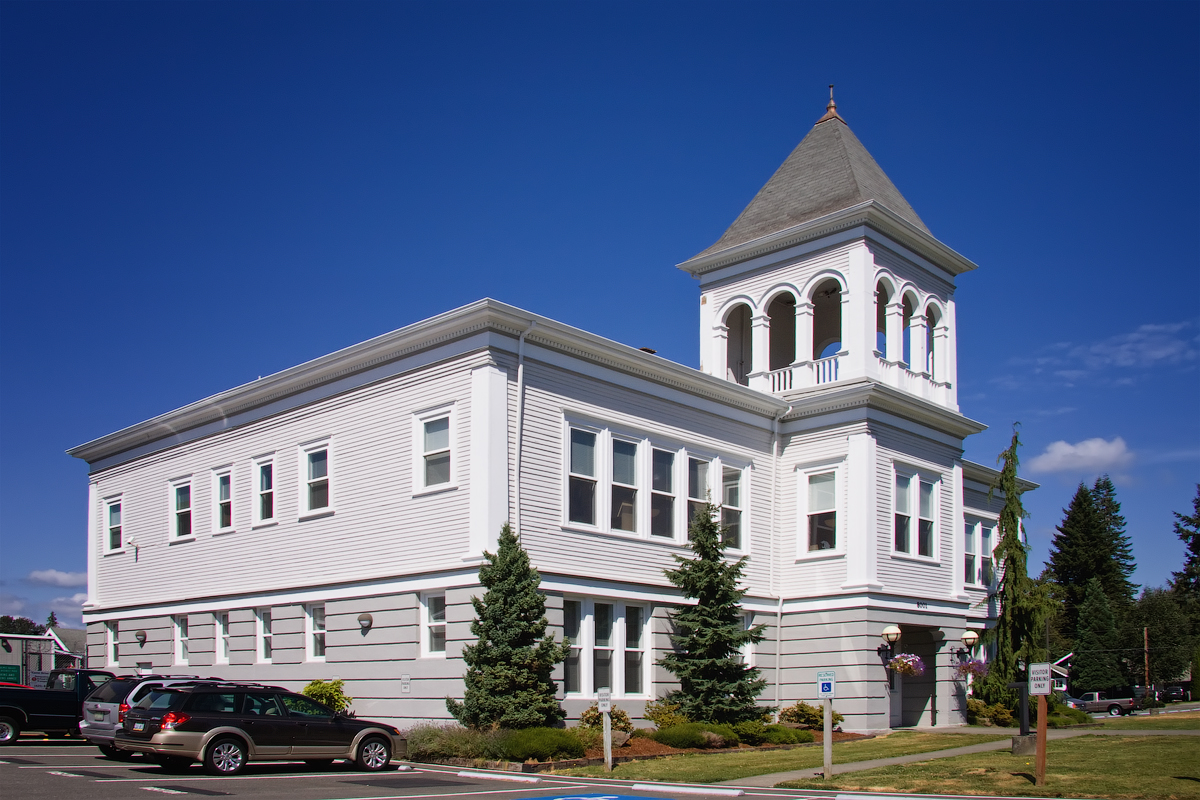
- District Administration Center
- 8001 Silva Avenue SE Snoqualmie, Washington, 98065

District information
- Type: Public
- Grades: PreK–12
- NCES District ID: 5308040

Students and staff
- Students: 7,209
- Teachers: 462

Other information
- Website: www.svsd410.org

The Snoqualmie Valley School District is located in King County, Washington about 40 miles (64 km) east of Seattle in the foothills of the Cascade Mountains. It encompasses over 400 square miles (1,000 km^{2}), making it geographically one of the largest school districts in Washington state. The district has an enrollment of approximately 7,200 students.

== History ==
Prior to 1945 there were three schools districts covering the area of present-day Snoqualmie Valley School District. They were the North Bend District, Snoqualmie District, and the Fall City District. These were consolidated into one large district in 1944. In the 2010-2020 decade, the total student population within this district increased by 25%. In 2023 the Snoqualmie Valley Schools Foundation donated $47,800 to fund district-wide initiatives for 2023–2024.

== Attendance boundary ==
It includes Snoqualmie Pass, Wilderness Rim, North Bend, Snoqualmie, Fall City, Preston, most of Ames Lake, a section of Union Hill-Novelty Hill, and a small section of Sammamish.

== Schools ==
The Snoqualmie Valley School District contains six elementary schools, three middle schools, one high school, and one alternative school.

=== Secondary schools ===
- Mount Si High School, built between 1952 and 1953 and remodeled in 1955, 1968, 1977, 1991, 2005 and 2019. It serves grades 9-12.
- Two Rivers School is an alternative school. It serves grades 9-12.

=== Elementary schools ===
- Cascade View Elementary School, located on Snoqualmie Ridge. It opened in 2005 and serves grades K-5.
- Timber Ridge Elementary School, located on Snoqualmie Ridge. It opened officially for the Fall 2016 school season and serves grades K-5.
- Fall City Elementary School, built in 1909 and remodeled in 1968, 1982, and 1999. The original gymnasium remains standing. It serves grades K-5.
- Meadowbrook School, 2012 It serves K-5.
- North Bend Elementary School, built in 1962 and remodeled in 1967, 1968, and 1999. It serves K-5.
- Opstad Elementary School, located in North Bend. It was built in 1988 and remodeled in 1989 and 1999. It serves grades P-5.
- Snoqualmie Elementary School, built in 1968 and was remodeled in 1985, 2000, and 2018. It serves grades P-5 and has 2 gymnasiums.

=== Middle schools ===
- Chief Kanim Middle School, located in Fall City. It was built in 1991 and expanded in 2005. It serves grades 6-8.
- Snoqualmie Middle School, built in 1972 and remodeled in 1977 and 2000. It serves grades 6-8. The campus was repurposed in 2013 as the ninth grade campus of Mt. Si High School and the middle-schoolers were transferred to either Chief Kanim or Twin Falls Middle Schools. It reopened for middle schoolers in 2019.
- Twin Falls Middle School, located a few miles east of North Bend. It opened in 2008 and serves grades 6-8.

=== Additional Schools ===
- Parent Partnership Program, located on the grounds of Snoqualmie Middle School in Snoqualmie.
- Transition Learning Center (TLC), located in North Bend.
- Preschool. New location opening for the 2025-2026 school year.
