= Washington State Route 202 =

State highway in King County, Washington, US

State Route 202
- Cascade Valleys Scenic Byway
- Map of western King County, with SR 202 highlighted in red

Route information
- Auxiliary route of US 2
- Maintained by WSDOT
- Length: 30.53 mi (49.13 km)
- Existed: 1964–present
- Tourist routes: Cascade Valleys Scenic Byway

Major junctions
- West end: SR 522 in Woodinville
- SR 520 in Redmond; SR 203 in Fall City
- East end: I-90 in North Bend

Location
- Country: United States
- State: Washington
- County: King

Highway system
- State highways in Washington; Interstate; US; State; Scenic; Pre-1964; 1964 renumbering; Former
← US 197	→ SR 203

State Route 202 (SR 202) is a state highway in the U.S. state of Washington, serving part of the Seattle metropolitan area. It runs southeasterly for 31 miles (50 km) in the Eastside region of King County, connecting Woodinville, Redmond, Fall City, and North Bend. The highway begins at SR 522 in Woodinville, intersects SR 520 in Redmond and SR 203 in Fall City, and terminates at Interstate 90 (I-90) in North Bend. The entire highway is designated as the Cascade Valleys Scenic Byway, a state scenic and recreational highway.

Railroads and roads in the Sammamish River and Snoqualmie River valleys, where modern-day SR 202 runs, were built during the late 19th and early 20th centuries. The early roads were incorporated into the Yellowstone Trail in the 1910s and became a state highway in 1925. SR 202 was established in 1964 as part of a new state highway system, running from Woodinville to Monroe; SR 522 was designated to the Woodinville–North Bend highway, continuing west to Seattle. By 1970, the designations were reversed, with SR 202 moved to the Woodinville–North Bend highway, and SR 522 moved to the Bothell–Monroe highway.

== Route description ==
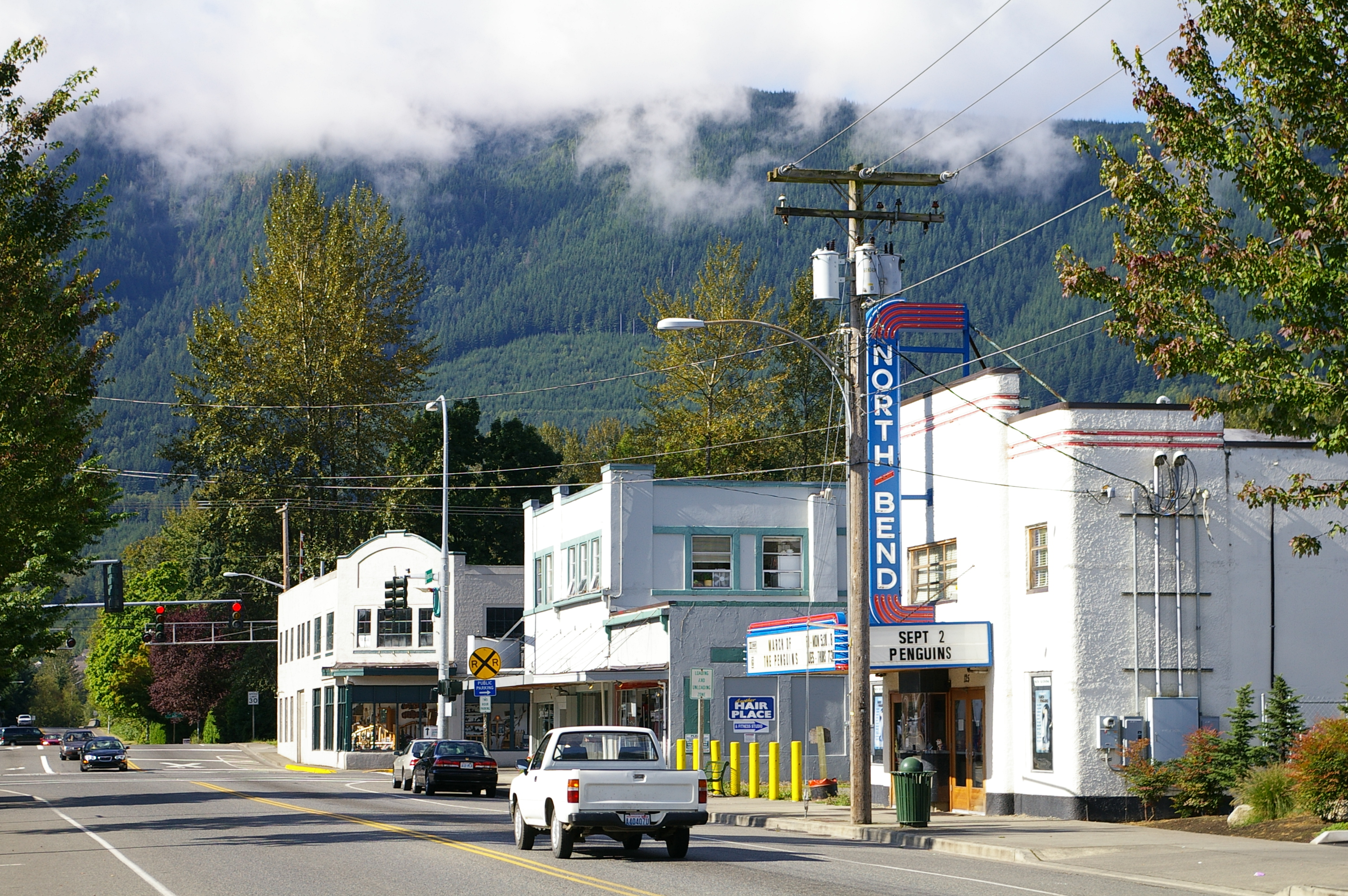
Looking eastbound on SR 202 in downtown North Bend from the historic North Bend Theatre

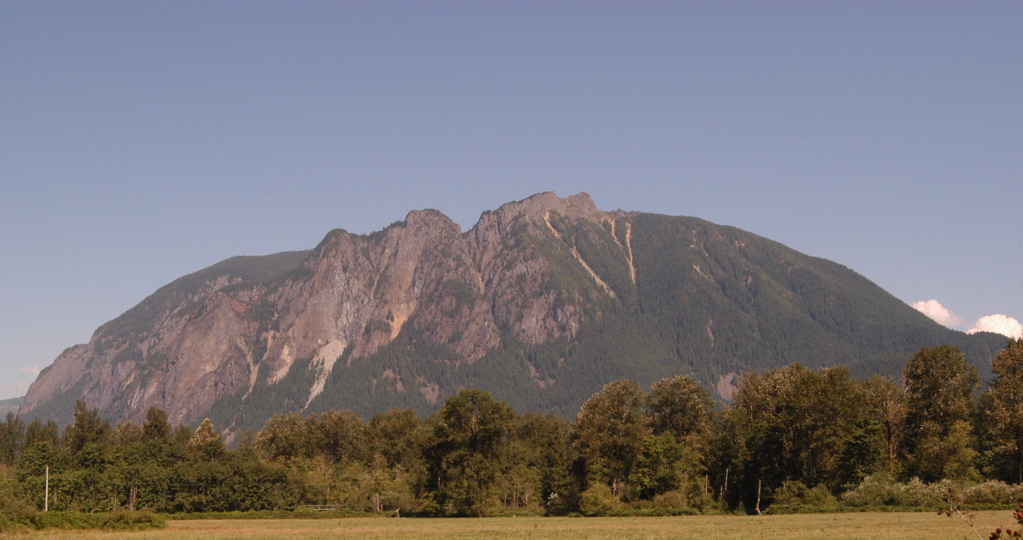
Mount Si, as it looks from SR 202 near North Bend

SR 202 begins at an interchange with SR 522 northwest of downtown Woodinville and east of the I-405 interchange. The highway travels south on 131st Avenue NE, crossing under a railroad overpass, before turning west onto NE 175th Street. SR 202 then crosses a railroad grade crossing and bridges the Sammamish River, before turning south onto Redmond–Woodinville Road. The highway travels south along the west side of the Sammamish River valley into Woodinville wine country, a district of wineries and tasting rooms south of Woodinville. SR 202 turns east onto NE 145th Street and crosses over the Sammamish River, and then enters the first in a series of three roundabouts that turn the highway southward.

SR 202 continues south along the east side of the rural Sammamish River valley and passes Sammamish River Regional Park before entering the city of Redmond. The highway travels along the western end of Education Hill and turns due south onto 164th Avenue NE while approaching downtown Redmond. SR 202 turns east onto Redmond Way at the terminus of former SR 908 and passes through Downtown Redmond near the Redmond Town Center. The street crosses over Bear Creek and under a freeway interchange with SR 520 before turning southeast. SR 202 continues along the edge of Marymoor Park near the north shore of Lake Sammamish, leaving Redmond and briefly entering the city of Sammamish.

SR 202 continues into unincorporated King County, traveling east and south around the Sammamish Plateau by following the course of Patterson Creek. The highway turns east at Duthie Hill and passes through Fall City, turning north to cross the Snoqualmie River. At the north end of the bridge, SR 202 intersects SR 203 in a roundabout, forming the latter's terminus. The highway continues southeast along the Snoqualmie River, passing Fall City Airport and crossing Tokul Creek via a long hairpin turn. SR 202 passes Snoqualmie Falls, enters a roundabout at Tokul Road, and travels south across the Snoqualmie River towards downtown Snoqualmie. From Snoqualmie, it travels southeast through the Three Forks lowlands and crosses the South Fork Snoqualmie River into North Bend. The highway turns southwest onto Bendigo Boulevard and travels through the city's downtown, exiting via a crossing of the South Fork Snoqualmie River. SR 202 passes the North Bend Premium Outlets mall and intersects I-90, where it terminates at a partial dumbbell interchange.

SR 202 is maintained by the Washington State Department of Transportation (WSDOT), who conduct an annual survey on its highways to measure traffic volume in terms of annual average daily traffic. In 2016, WSDOT calculated that 40,000 vehicles used SR 202 at its western terminus in Woodinville and 7,500 vehicles used it in Woodinville wine country, the highest and lowest counts along the highway, respectively. The entire highway is also designated as the Cascade Valleys Scenic Byway, a state scenic and recreational highway and heritage corridor.

== History ==
The Sammamish River valley was settled in the late 19th century and served by the Seattle, Lake Shore and Eastern Railway, built in 1889 from Bothell to North Bend, traveling through Redmond, present-day Sammamish, Issaquah, Fall City, and Snoqualmie. By 1902, several wagon roads were built along the railroad, including a road between Fall City and North Bend, which was incorporated into the Sunset Highway when it was designated as a state highway in 1909. The road from Redmond to North Bend became part of the national Yellowstone Trail in the 1910s, including a section near Redmond that was paved with bricks in 1913. A portion of the Yellowstone Trail, along with unpaved roads from Redmond to Bothell, were designated as a state highway in 1925. The highway was paved in the late 1920s, and was incorporated into the Seattle–Fall City branch of the Sunset Highway (Primary State Highway 2) in 1937. After the opening of the North Bend bypass in 1941, the branch highway was extended to North Bend over the former Sunset Highway.

In 1963, the Washington State Legislature commissioned a new state highway numbering system to ease confusion over similarly-numbered routes. The new system debuted in 1964, assigning State Route 522 (SR 522) to the Seattle–Bothell–North Bend highway, and State Route 202 (SR 202) to a proposed branch of the Stevens Pass Highway between Monroe and Bothell. By 1970, SR 522 was moved to the completed Bothell–Monroe highway, retaining the Seattle–Bothell portion, while SR 202 was designated to the remaining highway from Woodinville (east of Bothell) to North Bend.

SR 202 was extended 0.62 miles (1 km) southwest of downtown North Bend to a new interchange with I-90 in 1978, after it was moved to a freeway bypass of North Bend. The area around the new interchange was annexed by the city of North Bend prior to the opening of the I-90 bypass, and a factory outlet mall opened at the interchange in 1990. Since the early 2000s, the Washington State Department of Transportation (WSDOT) has built several roundabouts on SR 202 in Woodinville, Snoqualmie, Fall City, and North Bend, in an effort to improve the road's safety as traffic increases along the corridor. Another section of SR 202 between Redmond and Sammamish was widened in 2008 to accommodate additional traffic and included the construction of a new flyover ramp at the SR 520 interchange. In 2007, WSDOT also studied possible improvements to SR 202 in the Sammamish area, recommending the construction of new lanes, traffic signals, guardrails, and other projects. The study's recommended projects would cost an estimated $52.9 million to complete, and were not funded by the state government.

== Major intersections ==
The entire highway is in King County.

Location	mi	km	Destinations	Notes
Woodinville	0.00	0.00	SR 522 to I-405 – Bothell, Monroe	Interchange
Redmond	6.97	11.22	Redmond Way	Former SR 908
Redmond	7.70	12.39	SR 520 west / Avondale Road – Seattle	Interchange
Fall City	21.77	35.04	SR 203 north – Carnation	Roundabout
North Bend	30.53	49.13	I-90 – Seattle, Spokane	Interchange
1.000 mi = 1.609 km; 1.000 km = 0.621 mi
