= Mount Si High School =

Location
- 8651 Meadowbrook Way Southeast; Snoqualmie, Washington 98065; United States; 47°31′24″N 121°48′56″W

Information
- Type: Public High School
- School district: Snoqualmie Valley School District
- Principal: Vernie Newell
- Staff: 100.82 (on an FTE basis)
- Grades: 9-12
- Enrollment: 2,172 (2023–2024)
- Student to teacher ratio: 21.54
- Colors: Scarlet and Grey
- Mascot: Wildcat
- Rival: Skyline High School
- Website: School website

Mount Si High School is a high school located in the Snoqualmie Valley in Snoqualmie, Washington and is a part of the Snoqualmie Valley School District.

== History ==
According to the Seattle Times, Mount Si High School was founded as early as 1944, during World War II. The war affected the school, as six students died fighting in this war; then principal Miller B Stewart, who was also their Boy Scout scoutmaster, said "They were all good boys." Students in the school were praised for working to raise money for the war effort. Later graduates also served as leaders in the military in the 1990s. The Mount Si High School class of 1966 built a memorial for their classmates killed in action.

In the 1940s, Mount Si High School had between fifty-five and sixty-five students graduate every year. In 1952, the Snoqualmie School District allocated money to construct a new building for Mount Si High School.

Mount Si High School was used as a filming location in the television series Twin Peaks. After the filming of Twin Peaks, Mount Si High School completed the building of a new campus and demolished the old one, starting in 2015. The new campus opened on September 7, 2019. The new campus has seven buildings, some three stories, with greenhouses on top. It now houses up to 2,300 students, has a 400-car garage, and includes many security features (including few entry points and a secure check procedure before visitors are allowed in). Several food spaces exist, with some run by students in training. The new gym has two levels and bleachers for up to 2,400 people. As the school is on a flood plain, the school is "raised off of the ground on a platform above the 100-year flood level" and on 4,800 stone columns beneath the surface to stabilize the soil; this provides additional space for parking below the building. Two Rivers High School combined with Mount Si in 2020 during the COVID-19 pandemic. Some aspects of the school were completed later, including the baseball/softball fields in February 2020 and the new Performing Arts Center (PAC) in January 2021. A parking/bus loop area was completed in April 2021.

In 2005, a task force recommended the construction of new school buildings. However, voters defeated all the bond referendums. As a result, administrators asked voters for less, $30 million "to purchase modular classrooms and address some maintenance issues." That bond passed and modular classrooms did help, but Superintendent Joel Aune still advocated for a new building, claiming that the high school, built in the 1950s, had a “cobbled-together appearance, atrocious traffic flow, and was not education-friendly." The middle school was not as crowded, so administrators decided to use $3 million the district had set aside for infrastructure improvements to convert it into a freshman-only campus. “But we weren’t going to simply move 500 freshman and 25 teachers across the street and basically do things the same way we had always done them,” Aune said. “We took advantage of the opportunity to shift the way instruction is delivered. We wanted to make it much more personal and student-centered, so we invested heavily in tech and have created learning communities, where smaller groups of teachers and students work together collaboratively.” He said the school had a “unique design that was a wonderful fit for what we’re trying to do philosophically with the freshmen.” The program is now being emulated elsewhere in the district.

From 2012 to 2013, Mount Si High School opened a freshmen-only campus to solve overcrowding, adding an estimated $750,000 annually to future SVSD budgets while utilizing current district buildings. This was the result of an SVSD school board re-examination of the high school that had taken over 6 months. The population of the Snoqualmie school has been increasing, leaping 14% in 2005 and 2006, and growing about 3% per year after from 2006 to 2016 due to families moving to technology hubs in Seattle, Bellevue, and Redmond.

== School awards ==
Mount Si High School has received several honors for overall and academic achievement:

- appearing on US News & World Report's “Best High Schools” list. The magazine awarded a Silver Medal to the school in 2013, 2014, 2015, 2016, and 2018, based on reading, math and college readiness data. Mount Si was ranked 18 out of over 500 high schools in Washington state, and 1,243 of more than 20,500 high schools in the United States in 2018.
- being named to the College Board AP District Honor Roll in 2011, 2012, 2013, 2014, 2015, and 2023. The awards recognize increased student participation in college-level courses and increased performance on Advanced Placement (AP) exams over a three-year span. The school has an AP participation rate of 49 percent.
- Staff alumni and 2024 Varsity Cross Country team received endorsement by Senators Mark Mullet and Brad Hawkins, Representative Lisa Callan, and mayor Mary Miller through Resolution 8650, receiving encouragement that they “Really embody the best of student-athletes and what they have to offer.”
- Mount Si High School Cheerleading team placed third in the national cheerleading championship in 2018. It won the state championship in 2014 and 2016.
- being rated 17 out of the top 50 best high schools in Washington State
- being on Newsweek's 2016 America's Top 500 High Schools list

== Notable alumni ==
- Earl Biss, Crow oil painter
- Joe Waskom, professional middle-distance runner.

== Athletics ==
In the 2024 Basketball season, the Mt. Si Boys team, led by Blake Forrest and Weber State commit Trevor Hennig, won the 4A Boys state championship. Mt. Si and coach Jason Griffith went 25-0 in state competition (27-2 overall). They defeated Richland 72-58 to capture the title for the second time in school history, and the second in five years. [60]

== Studies of school ==
Research on Mount Si High School has been conducted by education scholars since the 1960s, including research on its "innovative uses of social media," Competition and state-validated student films, the "identification of employability skills," and the identification of CTE employable skills within the student body, the teaching of American history, and the teaching of journalism.

== Controversies ==
In 2008, Mount Si High School was involved in a controversy over a visit by Reverend Ken Hutcherson, who was invited to speak about his experience growing up with racism. Some called into question his dedication to equality for all people in light of his opposition to same-sex relationships, because of his calling the school's GSA alliance a “sex club”. One librarian received an email from Hutcherson, and was asked if she “wanted to be added to the list of Mount Si teachers he was pushing to have fired.” Hutcherson had reportedly said in an interview: “I guarantee you, my brother, you can say whatever you want about Martin Luther King, but he was not fighting for people’s rights in the bedroom. Do not go down that road with me. If you go down that road with me, you’re gonna get a fight.” Hutcherson then used money from his nonprofit "to fight against a $56 million bond measure that would have helped repair Mount Si High School's decaying floors, installed wheelchair accessible ramps in the school's portables, and fixed other buildings in the district (while also paying for construction of a new middle school)." In November 2009, a freshman attending Mount Si High School was attacked by another student in a locker room after defending another student against anti-gay slurs.

On January 7, 2011, a former student and an accomplice entered school premises in an attempted burglary, causing US$30,000 in damages (equivalent to $43,000 in 2025) . The offenders stole $2,000 in cash and checks (equivalent to $3,000 in 2025), as well as a 22-inch (56 cm) television and Xbox 360 system from the ASB student lounge. Both men were then booked into King County Jail on suspicion of second-degree burglary, first degree theft, and malicious mischief.

On February 12, 2015, a student was arrested for allegedly having "inappropriate photos of others" on his electronic devices and sharing them online with social media. Principal John Belcher released a statement urging students with information to come forward, in addition to anyone else who had been victimized. The Snoqualmie Police Department conducted the investigation with the help of Washington State Patrol's Missing and Exploited Children Task Force. Prosecutors considered charging the student with cyber-bullying and possession of child pornography, but no further details have been released.

During 2015 and 2016, an online "March Madness-esque" bracket was created not about basketball, but about women. The event was nicknamed the "Hot girl contest" by the student population, where online participants voted on the head-to-head match ups of female students, with the winner moving to the next round. Before being shut down by the school administration, the event received mixed reviews, when the school's gender equality group wore t-shirts in an effort to stop the contest that they said was degrading to female students. Other students said the game was just harmless fun. Administrative consequences in 2015 started effect on Friday, May 8, with consequences including not participating in post-season athletics, prom or graduation ceremonies. Two years later in March 2018 a 16-year-old girl was assaulted near campus, prompting a school lockdown and early dismissal.

In February 2020, an image resurfaced of Principal Belcher at the end of school year car show giving a shaka sign in front of a truck with multiple Confederate flags displayed. As MSHS is a 4a school with very low demographic of students of color, this raised concerns in administration, students and families about that historical connotation. Belcher addressed the concerns through the Snoqualmie Valley Record, expressing in his response that he "[takes] this work to heart and will do all I can do to find equality and justice every day at Mount Si High School." He was later re-hired by the Cle Elum-Roslyn High School as Superintendent around May 25, 2022, and stated that Cle Elum was "On the brink of major growth, changing demands and voices on the system, and a need for what I anticipate will be expansion of the district." With Belcher's resignation, Deb Hay of Lake Stevens High School took his place.

On May 5, 2020, a student died on Mount Si High School premises due to an overdose on fentanyl-laced drugs. This caused an overturn of the school counselors, psychologists and incited the hire of the school's full-time mental health therapist from Friends of Youth.
