= Fantastic Falls =

Waterfall in Washington (state), United States

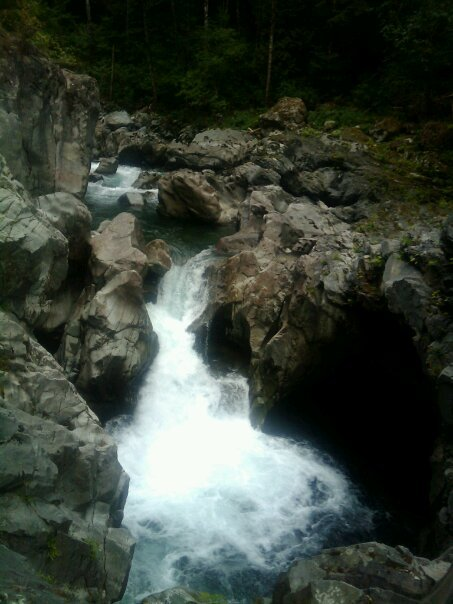
- Interactive map of Fantastic Falls
- Location: Ernie's Grove, WA
- Coordinates: 47.53863°N 121.73151°W
- Type: Horsetail
- Total height: 35 ft (11 m)
- Number of drops: 1
- Watercourse: North Fork Snoqualmie River

Fantastic Falls is a waterfall on the North fork of the Snoqualmie River in the U.S. state of Washington. At 35 feet (11 m), is the largest of several small (none taller than 10 feet (3.0 m)) waterfalls in the Ernie's Grove area.

== See also ==
- Snoqualmie River
