= Washington State Route 203 =

State highway in Washington, US

State Route 203
- A map of the Seattle region with SR 203 highlighted in red

Route information
- Auxiliary route of US 2
- Maintained by WSDOT
- Length: 24.28 mi (39.07 km)
- Existed: 1964–present

Major junctions
- South end: SR 202 in Fall City
- North end: US 2 in Monroe

Location
- Country: United States
- State: Washington
- Counties: King, Snohomish

Highway system
- State highways in Washington; Interstate; US; State; Scenic; Pre-1964; 1964 renumbering; Former
← SR 202	→ SR 204

State Route 203 (SR 203) is a state highway in the U.S. state of Washington that traverses part of King and Snohomish counties. It runs north–south for 24 miles (39 km) through the Snoqualmie Valley, connecting Fall City, Carnation, Duvall, and Monroe. The highway terminates to the south at a roundabout with SR 202 near Fall City and to the north at a junction with U.S. Route 2 (US 2) in Monroe.

The road network along the Snoqualmie River developed in the early 20th century to connect communities that had been established near a branch of the Chicago, Milwaukee, St. Paul and Pacific Railroad. These county roads were paved and added to the state highway system in 1937 as Secondary State Highway 15B (SSH 15B), which served as a connector between state highways in Fall City and Monroe.

SSH 15B was straightened and rebuilt by the state government in the 1940s and 1950s before being replaced by SR 203 during the 1964 state highway renumbering. SR 203 was included as part of the proposed corridor for an outer freeway bypass, tentatively named Interstate 605, in the early 2000s. The highway was later improved by a series of construction projects, including the construction of two roundabouts in Fall City and Duvall.

== Route description ==
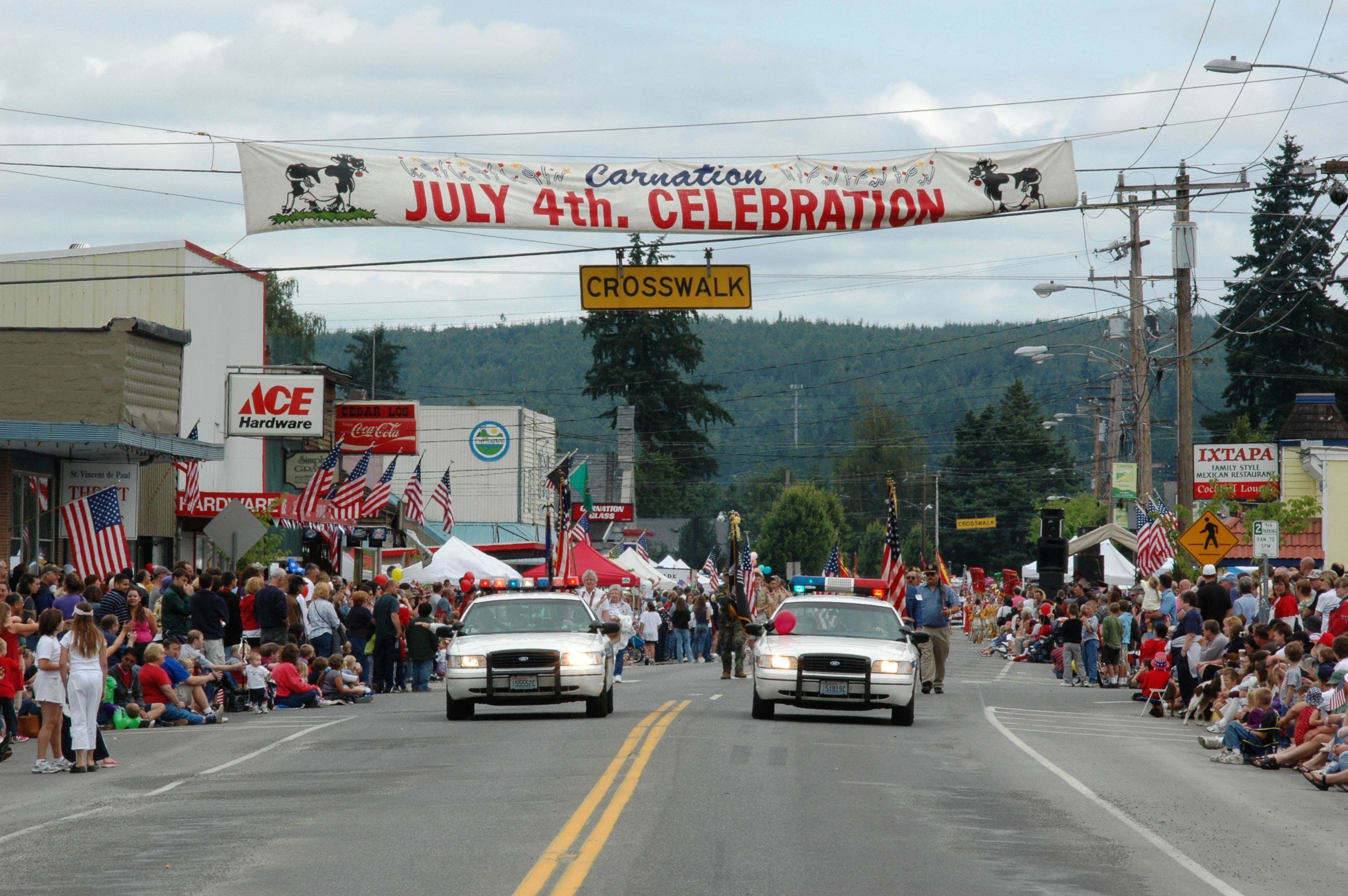
SR 203 in Carnation during a parade

SR 203 begins at a roundabout with SR 202 on the north side of the Snoqualmie River opposite from downtown Fall City. The highway travels northwest along the river, following the eastern ridge of the rural Snoqualmie Valley and the Snoqualmie Valley Trail, and turns north near Pleasant Hill. After passing several farms and a golf course, SR 203 crosses over the Tolt River and enters the city of Carnation. The highway runs northeasterly through downtown Carnation on Tolt Avenue, passing the city library and the historic Tolt IOOF/Eagles Hall before leaving the city. After crossing the Snoqualmie Valley Trail at the Chinook Bend north of Carnation, SR 203 reaches Lake Marcel and turns northwest to follow the Snoqualmie River around Novelty Hill.

The highway then turns north and intersects Northeast 124th Street in a roundabout before entering Duvall, where it passes through downtown on Main Street. SR 203 continues northeast across the Cherry Valley and turns northwest before it reaches the Snohomish County line. The highway traverses the Tualco Valley and passes several farms, including one operated by the Monroe Correctional Complex, before crossing over the Skykomish River on a steel truss bridge at the city limits of Monroe. SR 203 travels through Monroe on Lewis Street, passing through residential neighborhoods and the west side of Al Borlin Park before reaching the city's downtown. The highway crosses Main Street and over the Scenic Subdivision of the BNSF Railway before SR 203 terminates at an intersection with US 2. Main Street continues north as Chain Lake Road, while US 2 continues east towards Stevens Pass and west to Snohomish and Everett. The junction is located one mile (1.6 km) east of the Evergreen State Fairgrounds and the terminus of SR 522.

SR 203 is maintained by the Washington State Department of Transportation (WSDOT), which conducts an annual survey on state highways to measure traffic volume in terms of annual average daily traffic. Average traffic volumes on the highway in 2016 ranged from a minimum of 7,200 vehicles near Fall City to a maximum of 14,000 vehicles north of Duvall. Most of SR 203 is a rural, shoulder-less highway with two lanes and a speed limit of 50 to 55 miles per hour (80 to 89 km/h) outside of city centers. A short section of the route within Monroe is also designated as a MAP-21 principal arterial route under the National Highway System. Due to the road's low-lying route alongside the Snoqualmie River, it is routinely flooded during winter storms and often closes for several days each year.

== History ==
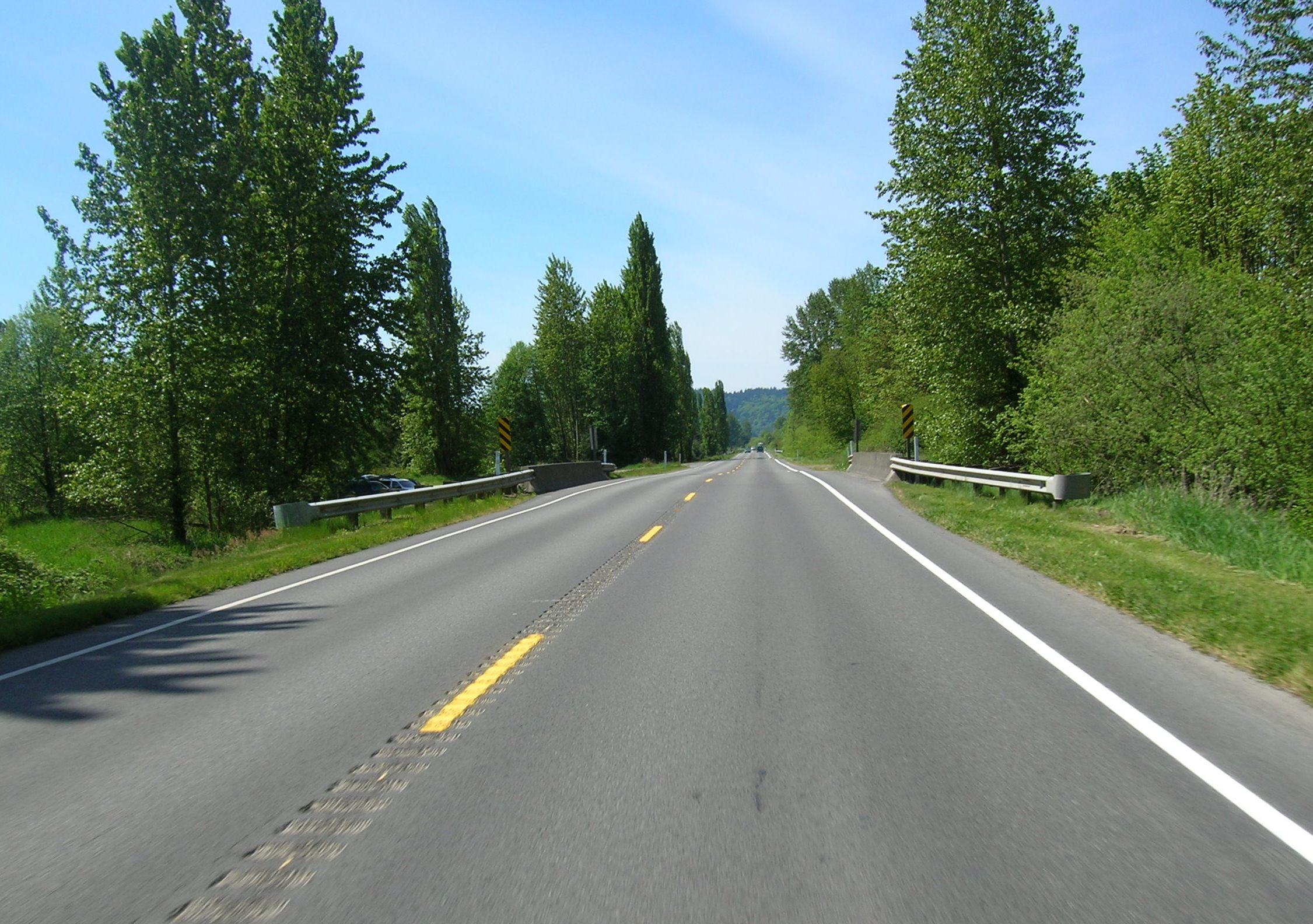
A rural stretch of SR 203 between Duvall and Monroe

The Snoqualmie Valley was settled in the late 19th century and its communities were originally connected by a series of unpaved country roads, among the earliest to be built in King County. The initial road was built on the west side of the valley in the 1870s and a new road on the east side followed in the late 1880s, connecting Fall City, Tolt (now Carnation), and Cherry Valley to Monroe. The road originally crossed the Skykomish River via a short ferry route when the waters were too high for fording by wagons and horses; this crossing was replaced by the first fixed, wooden bridge at the site in August 1894. A branch of the Chicago, Milwaukee, St. Paul and Pacific Railroad was built along the east bank of the river in 1911, necessitating the relocation of the road and the entire town of Cherry Valley (now Duvall).

The northernmost section of the road, along Lewis Street in downtown Monroe, was paved by the city government in 1912 and connected to a bridge over the Skykomish River that was rebuilt as a steel structure in 1915. The King County government followed suit with several state-funded paving projects on the eastern highway in the 1910s and 1920s. By the mid-1920s, the paved Snoqualmie Valley highway extended south from Monroe to the King–Snohomish county line north of Duvall, while the remainder was described as an improved road with varying quality. The road was incorporated into the state highway system in 1937 as Secondary State Highway 15B (SSH 15B), connecting Primary State Highway 15 (PSH 15) in Monroe to PSH 2 and U.S. Route 10 (US 10) in Fall City. The state legislature approved funds to pave the entire highway in 1937 and oiling of the road from Carnation to Duvall was completed two years later. The final paving projects were approved in 1945 and completed over the following three years alongside the replacement of sixteen wooden bridges. The state also straightened sections of SSH 15B near Fall City in the 1940s and through the Tualco Valley south of Monroe in the 1950s. The Lewis Street Bridge over the Skykomish River in Monroe was replaced by the state in 1957 at a cost of $526,000.

The state legislature reformed the numbering system for state highways in 1964, re-designating SSH 15B as State Route 203. The branch railroad running parallel to the highway was abandoned in the 1970s and later converted into the Snoqualmie Valley Trail. The Tolt River Bridge in Carnation was replaced with a new span in 1977.

The Snoqualmie Valley area was proposed in the late 1990s and early 2000s as the corridor for a proposed outer bypass of the Seattle metropolitan area, popularly named Interstate 605. The state legislature commissioned a study in 1998 to determine the feasibility of constructing the freeway, which would have traveled from southern King County to Everett via SR 18 and the SR 203 corridor in the Snoqualmie Valley. The study determined that through-travelers would have only saved five minutes over peak travel times and the legislature shelved the plan. A second study commissioned in 2003 determined that a highway built north of Snoqualmie would not be economically feasible and would fail to sufficiently benefit freight interests to justify its multibillion-dollar cost.

In the 2000s, WSDOT began a series of construction projects on sections of the SR 203 corridor that aimed to improve traffic congestion and increase road safety. A roundabout was constructed in southern Duvall to replace the unsignalized intersection at Northeast 124th Street in 2004, the first to be built on a rural highway in Western Washington, and received favorable feedback from local residents. WSDOT completed construction of a second roundabout in 2008 at the highway's southern terminus with SR 202 in Fall City, costing $4 million. A 2004 study of potential improvements to SR 203 also suggested the addition of a rumble strip in the road's centerline, along with hard landscaping to force motorists to slow down when entering populated areas. A fish culvert on Loutsis Creek was replaced by a composite arch bridge in 2020, the first of its kind in the state.

== Major intersections ==
County	Location	mi	km	Destinations	Notes
King	Fall City	0.00	0.00	SR 202 – Snoqualmie, Redmond	Roundabout
Snohomish	Monroe	23.31– 23.42	37.51– 37.69	Bridge over Skykomish River	
Snohomish	Monroe	24.28	39.07	US 2 – Everett, Wenatchee	
1.000 mi = 1.609 km; 1.000 km = 0.621 mi
