= Fall City, Washington =

- Census-designated place
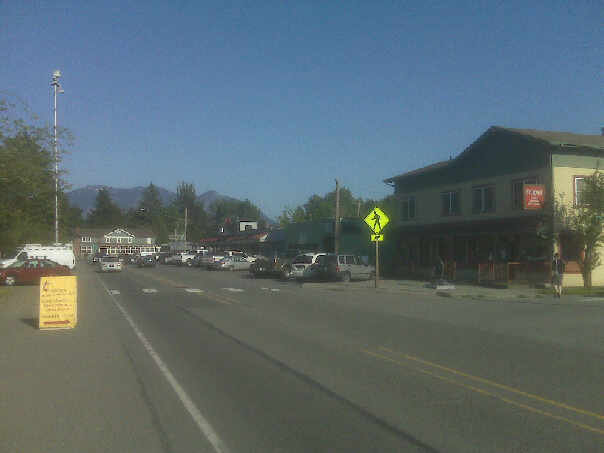
- Downtown Fall City, 1999
- Interactive map of Fall City, Washington
- Coordinates: 47°34′18″N 121°54′48″W
- Country: United States
- State: Washington
- County: King
- Established: 1856

Government
  - Type: Unincorporated area

Area
  - Total: 2.90 sq mi (7.51 km^{2})
  - Land: 2.84 sq mi (7.35 km^{2})
  - Water: 0.054 sq mi (0.14 km^{2})
- Elevation: 118 ft (36 m)

Population (2020)
  - Total: 2,032
  - Density: 717/sq mi (276.8/km^{2})
- Time zone: UTC–8 (Pacific (PST))
  - Summer (DST): UTC–7 (PDT)
- ZIP Code: 98024
- Area code: 425
- FIPS code: 53-23200
- GNIS feature ID: 2408111
- Website: fallcity.org

Fall City is an unincorporated community and census-designated place (CDP) in King County, Washington, United States, 25 miles (40 km) east of Seattle. The community lies along the Snoqualmie River and Raging River. The population was 2,032 at the 2020 census.

== History ==
The first settlements in the area were two forts built in 1856 during the Puget Sound War to protect future settlers against possible uprisings by the native population. Fort Patterson, a few miles downstream, and Fort Tilton, a few miles upstream, were built with the help of Indians led by Chief Patkanim, and both were abandoned within two years after interactions with the local tribes remained peaceful. A historical marker can be found north of Fall City on Fish Hatchery Road where Fort Tilton once stood.

A trading post was established near the present-day location of the Last Frontier Saloon in 1869 and became a hub of the local economy. Fall City was known at the time as "The Landing", as shallow water and rapids upstream on the Snoqualmie were impassable to the large dugout canoes used to transport goods. In the early 1870s, the first local mill in the Snoqualmie Valley was opened at the mouth of Tokul Creek, just downstream from Snoqualmie Falls and just upstream from where Fall City would be. The Fall City post office opened June 10, 1872.

Small steamboats started ferrying supplies up the river in 1875. In the late 1880s, a group of Puget Sound businessmen founded and started building the Seattle, Lake Shore and Eastern Railway, including a line up into the upper Snoqualmie Valley, in an attempt to build a line over the Cascade Range. The land claim holder at the time, Jeremiah "Jerry" Borst, had Fall City surveyed and platted in anticipation of the people the railroad would bring, but was disappointed in 1889 when the railroad line was built a mile (1.6 km) away from the community.

But even a mile away, the railroad, combined with the first bridge over the Snoqualmie River, greatly improved the local lumber mills' and farmers' business, and made the area and its scenic features (such as Snoqualmie Falls) accessible to tourists. Hundreds moved to the area over the next two decades.

When the Sunset Highway connecting Seattle with Eastern Washington through Fall City was improved in the early 1910s, it further accelerated the area's economic and residential development. By the late 1920s, most of the population either worked in the burgeoning tourist trade or commuted to work west toward Issaquah and Seattle.

The Great Depression, followed by gasoline rationing during World War II, hurt Fall City's tourist trade. Tourism was further hampered after the war as U.S. Highway 10 (now Interstate 90) was rerouted south directly from Preston to North Bend, bypassing Fall City and Snoqualmie. The local economy suffered further as local logging mills started closing.

Fall City is a bedroom community to the high-tech industry of the Seattle metropolitan area, with large suburban estates just outside the community juxtaposed with the historical homes and farmsteads built in its heyday.

== Geography ==
Fall City is in central King County at the confluence of the Snoqualmie River and the Raging River. The rivers are sometimes flooded during the autumn and winter. More typical is a strong east wind as pressure gradients carry higher pressure air across Snoqualmie Pass and down the Snoqualmie Valley.

According to the United States Census Bureau, the CDP has a total area of 2.90 square miles (7.51 km^{2}), of which 2.84 square miles (7.36 km^{2}) is land and 0.06 square miles (0.16 km^{2}) or 1.52%, are water.

=== Climate ===
The area's climate has mild differences between highs and lows, and there is adequate rainfall year-round. According to the Köppen Climate Classification system, Fall City has a marine west coast climate, abbreviated "Cfb" on climate maps.

== Demographics ==
Historical population
Census	Pop.	Note	%±
1980	1,528		—
1990	1,582		3.5%
2000	1,638		3.5%
2010	1,993		21.7%
2020	2,032		2.0%
U.S. Decennial Census; 1970 1980 1990; 2000 2010 2020

=== 2020 census ===
Fall City, Washington – racial and ethnic composition Note: the US Census treats Hispanic/Latino as an ethnic category. This table excludes Latinos from the racial categories and assigns them to a separate category. Hispanics/Latinos may be of any race.
Race / ethnicity (NH = non-Hispanic)	Pop. 2000	Pop. 2010	Pop. 2020	% 2000	% 2010	% 2020
White alone (NH)	1,529	1,785	1,634	93.35%	89.56%	80.41%
Black or African American alone (NH)	4	3	5	0.24%	0.15%	0.25%
Native American or Alaska Native alone (NH)	14	19	22	0.85%	0.95%	1.08%
Asian alone (NH)	12	19	39	0.73%	0.95%	1.92%
Pacific Islander alone (NH)	0	2	6	0.00%	0.10%	0.30%
Other race alone (NH)	3	0	7	0.18%	0.00%	0.34%
Mixed race or multiracial (NH)	33	51	137	2.01%	2.56%	6.72%
Hispanic or Latino (any race)	43	114	182	2.63%	5.72%	8.96%
Total	1,638	1,993	2,032	100.00%	100.00%	100.00%

As of the 2020 census, there were 2,032 people, 752 households, and 550 families residing in the CDP. The population density was 715.5 inhabitants per square mile (276.3/km^{2}). There were 783 housing units of which 31, or 4.0%, were vacant. The racial makeup of the CDP was 82.3% White, 0.2% African American, 1.2% Native American, 1.9% Asian, 0.3% Pacific Islander, 2.5% from some other races and 11.5% from two or more races. Hispanic or Latino people of any race were 8.96% of the population. 23.0% of residents were under the age of 18, % were under 5 years of age, and % were 65 and older.

=== 2010 census ===
As of the 2010 census, there were 1,993 people, 762 households and 561 families residing in the CDP. The population density was 704.0 inhabitants per square mile (271.8/km^{2}). There were 812 housing units, of which 50, or 6.2%, were vacant. The racial makeup of the CDP was 91.9% White, 0.2% African American, 1.0% Native American, 1.0% Asian, 0.1% Native Hawaiian or Pacific Islander, 2.6% some other race, and 3.3% from two or more races. Hispanic or Latino people of any race were 5.72% of the population.

Of the 762 households, 36.2% had children under the age of 18 living with them, 55.8% were headed by married couples living together, 10.9% had a female householder with no husband present, and 26.4% were non-families. 19.2% of all households were made up of individuals, and 6.6% were someone living alone who was 65 years of age or older. The average household size was 2.62, and the average family size was 2.94.

In the CDP, 24.4% of the population were under the age of 18, 6.8% were from 18 to 24, 23.0% were from 25 to 44, 33.2% were from 45 to 64, and 12.5% were 65 years of age or older. The median age was 42.7 years. For every 100 females there were 103.4 males. For every 100 females age 18 and over, there were 100.4 males.

== Education ==
Fall City residents attend schools from the Snoqualmie Valley School District.

Two schools in the Snoqualmie Valley School District are in Fall City: Fall City Elementary School and Chief Kanim Middle School.

== Transportation ==
Fall City is bisected by State Route 202, a highway that traverses part of the Snoqualmie Valley between Woodinville and North Bend. It intersects State Route 203, which connects to Duvall and Monroe. The community has limited public transit service provided by Snoqualmie Valley Transportation, which operates a shuttle from North Bend to Duvall with funding from King County Metro.

The Fall City Airport is a small private airport community 2 miles (3 km) east of Fall City. The airport is owned by the Fall City Airport Association and has no air traffic control tower.

== In popular culture ==
The Fall City Roadhouse was a filming location for the TV Series Twin Peaks.
