= Earl Biss =

Native American painter from Montana, U.S. (1947–1998)

- Iláaxe Baahéeleen Díilish
- Born: September 29, 1947; Renton, Washington
- Died: October 18, 1998 (aged 51); Santa Fe, New Mexico
- Other names: Spotted Horse; The Spirit Who Walks Among His People
- Citizenship: Crow Tribe of Montana and U.S.
- Education: San Francisco Art Institute; Institute of American Indian Arts

Earl Biss (September 29, 1947 – October 18, 1998), also called Spotted Horse (Crow: Iichíile Xáxxish) and The Spirit Who Walks Among His People (Iláaxe Baahéeleen Díilish), was a Native American painter born in Renton, Washington. He was Apsáalooke and a citizen of the Crow Tribe of Montana.

A significant Native American fine artist, Biss is known for his colorful oil paintings of Plains Indians and western landscapes. He exhibited his artwork widely and has works in the public collections of institutions including the New Mexico Museum of Art, the Missoula Art Museum, and the Gilcrease Museum.

== Early life ==
Biss was born to Earl Biss Sr. and Dorothy Shane and was a child of the Greasy Mouth Burnt Lip Clan. He was a descendent of Crow scout White Man Runs Him. As a young child, Biss split his time between living with his grandmother in Montana on the Crow Indian Reservation and with his father on the Yakama Indian Reservation in Washington.

At the age of eight, Biss fell ill with rheumatic fever. During his convalescence, he began painting and soon showed significant talent in the arts. Elders gave the young artist the Crow name Spotted Horse (Iichíile Xáxxish).

Biss spent time at both Mount Si High School and Wapato High School. At the age of 16, he began at the Institute of American Indian Arts (IAIA) along contemporaries T. C. Cannon (Kiowa/Caddo) and Kevin Red Star (Crow_. While there, from 1963 to 1965, Biss studied under faculty including Fritz Scholder (La Jolla Luiseño), Allan Houser (Ft. Sill Apache), Charles Loloma (Hopi), and Paolo Soleri. He was inspired by Abstract expressionism and other Modern art movements to incorporate wider influences into Native art, in turn helping found the Contemporary Southwestern Art movement. Said Red Star, "Earl was the catalyst, like the agitator in a washing machine."

After studying oil painting on scholarship at the San Francisco Art Institute, Biss traveled to Europe to explore art museums and to study printmaking with Stanley William Hayter. Biss also spent six months painting on Corfu in Greece. Biss said, "I believe my work was most influenced by the works of the European masters: the violent translucent skies of [William] Turner, the impressionistic brush work of Monet, illusive suggestiveness of Whistlerlandscapes." Other influences included Edvard Munch, Jackson Pollock and Willem de Kooning.

== Career ==
Biss had his first solo exhibition in 1972, which sold out and earned him enough money to travel and learn. He quickly became well known as a master oil painter in his own right, and his work was exhibited across the globe.

Biss moved often, setting up studios in places including Santa Fe, San Francisco, Red Lodge, and Colorado. He was a prolific artist who created thousands of works in his lifetime. He often worked in days-long painting sessions in which he would create under the influence of alcohol and other substances. He prided himself on his technique, once saying: "Ninety-nine percent of the artists in the United States don't really know oil painting and if an artist doesn't paint in oils then he isn't a real artist."

After years of artwork honoring his Apsáalooke heritage, Biss earned the name The Spirit Who Walks Among His People (Iláaxe Baahéeleen Díilish).

== Personal life ==
Of Biss, his colleague Presley LaFountain said: "His passion was Indian people, horses, women and art." Biss had numerous relationships and marriages throughout his life.

In 1998, Biss died of a stroke while painting in his studio in Santa Fe, New Mexico. He is interred at the Crow Agency Cemetery in Crow Agency, Montana.

== Legacy ==
In 2021, Biss was the subject of a documentary film Earl Biss: The Spirit Who Walks Among His People.
