= Forward Thrust =

Series of bond ballot initiatives in King County, Washington

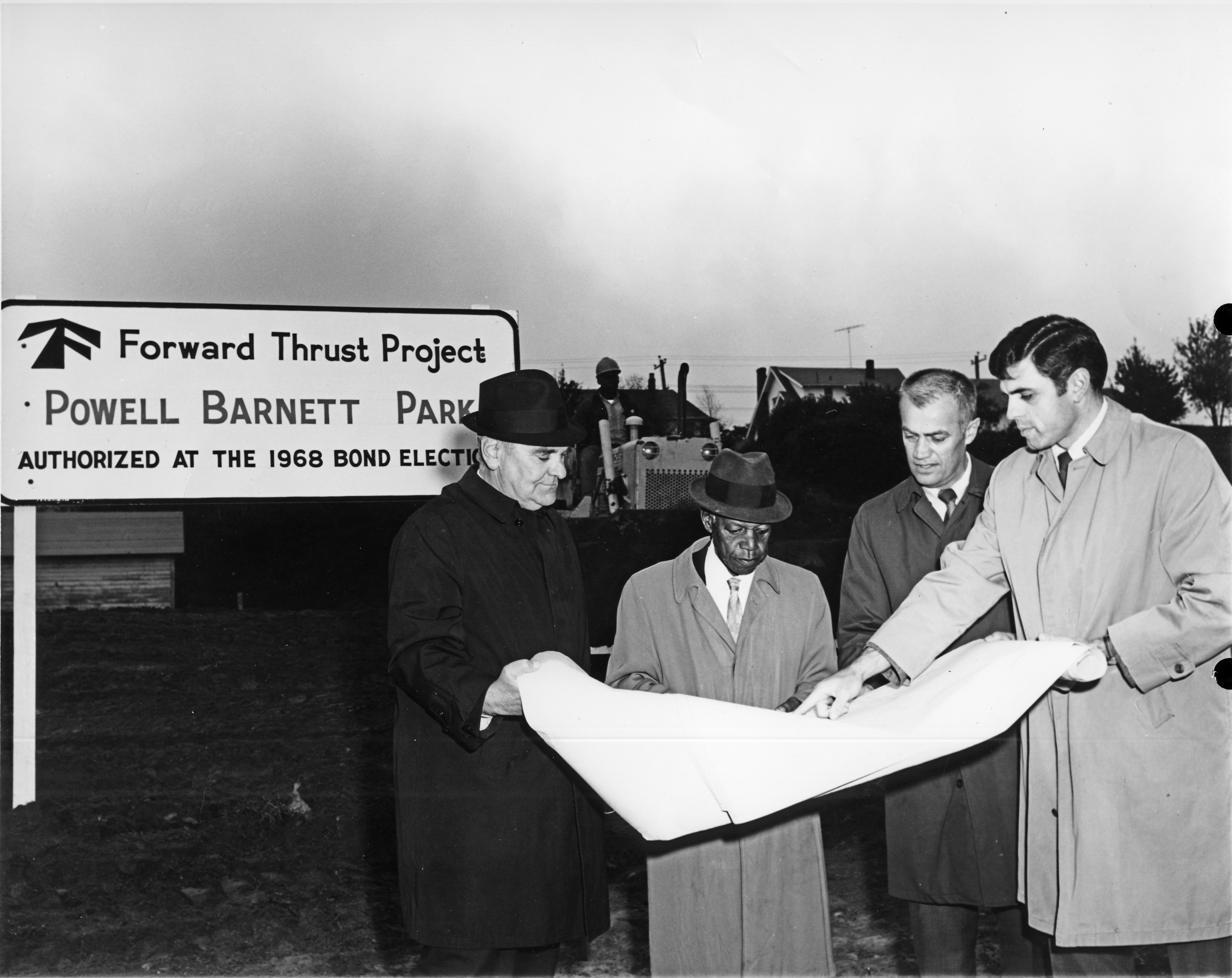
Powell S. Barnett and three Seattle parks officials look over plans for Powell Barnett Park, one of many parks funded by the Forward Thrust bonds

The Forward Thrust ballot initiatives were a series of bond propositions put to the voters of King County, Washington in 1968 and 1970, designed by a group called the Forward Thrust Committee. Seven of the twelve propositions in 1968 were successful; four of the remaining propositions were repackaged for a vote in 1970, when they were defeated in the darkening local economic climate of the Boeing Bust. One of the most visible accomplishments of the Forward Thrust levy was the eventual building of the Kingdome, ultimately the first home of the Seattle Seahawks and Seattle Mariners.

The initiatives were variously under the aegis of METRO (the Municipality of Metropolitan Seattle), King County, and the city of Seattle. (METRO and King County merged in 1992.) The Forward Thrust Committee was founded by James R. Ellis and effectively disbanded shortly after the 1970 defeats. It disbanded formally in 1974. Seattle Mayor Dorm Braman was also a strong backer of the 1968 initiatives.

The US$118 million passed in 1968 in support of the Department of Parks and Recreation was, at the time, the largest parks and recreation bond issue ever passed in the United States.

The failure of the rapid transit propositions meant that a nearly $900 million federal funding earmark that had been secured by U.S. Senator Warren Magnuson if local bonds passed went instead to fund Atlanta, Georgia's MARTA.

== Results ==
The elections took place February 13, 1968, and May 19, 1970. Each initiative required a 60% supermajority to pass. The results were as follows; bold typeface indicates successful propositions:

Year	Initiative	US$ amount (millions)	Yes	% Yes	No	% No	Result
1968	METRO Proposition 1: Rapid Transit	$385M local + $765M federal	97,339	50.8%	94,187	49.2%	Failed
1968	METRO Proposition 2: Transit System Administration	N/A	Metro Council; 75,808	46.8%	New Commission; 86,202	53.2%	Voided by failure of Metro Prop. 1
1968	County Proposition 1: Youth Service Center	$6.1M	174,749	72.4%	66,594	27.6%	Passed
1968	County Proposition 2: Multipurpose Stadium	$40M	151,489	62.3%	91,499	37.7%	Passed, resulted in the Kingdome
1968	County Proposition 3: Community Centers	$26.2M	136,804	58.7%	96,129	41.3%	Failed
1968	County Proposition 4: Arterial Highways	$81.6M	147,379	62.2%	89,489	37.8%	Passed
1968	County Proposition 5: Storm Water Drainage	$68M	139,254	59.3%	95,373	40.7%	Failed
1968	County Proposition 6: Parks & Recreation (including Seattle Aquarium)	$118M	157,323	64.7%	85,790	35.3%	Passed
1968	Seattle Proposition 1: Neighborhood Improvements	$12M	74,915	60.8%	48,259	39.2%	Passed
1968	Seattle Proposition 2: Sewer Bonds	$70M	74,852	62.6%	44,596	37.4%	Passed
1968	Seattle Proposition 3: Low Income Housing	$3M	69,089	57.9%	50,057	42.1%	Failed
1968	Seattle Proposition 4: Fire Protection	$6.2M	82,867	69.8%	35,758	30.2%	Passed
1968	Seattle Proposition 5: Maintenance Shops	$3M	66,061	57.6%	48,555	42.4%	Failed
1970	(Rapid transit)	$440M local $881M federal		46%		54%	Failed
1970	(Storm water control)	$80M					Failed
1970	(New community centers)						Failed
1970	(New county jails)	$40.2M					Failed

== See also ==
- King County Metro
