= Washington State Route 908 =

Former state highway in Washington, United States

State Route 908

Route information
- Auxiliary route of I-90
- Maintained by WSDOT
- Existed: 1971–2010

Major junctions
- West end: I-405 in Kirkland
- East end: SR 202 in Redmond

Location
- Country: United States
- State: Washington

Highway system
- State highways in Washington; Interstate; US; State; Scenic; Pre-1964; 1964 renumbering; Former
← SR 906	→ SR 970

State Route 908, commonly known as SR 908 or Highway 908, was a state highway in the U.S. state of Washington. Prior to its decommissioning in 2010, it ran easterly about 3 miles (4.8 km) from eastern Kirkland to central Redmond. SR 908 was entirely within King County.

== Route description ==
SR 908 started at its western end when Central Way in Kirkland crosses under Interstate 405, at Exit 18 of I-405. SR 908 proceeded due east through Kirkland as Northeast 85th Street. At the Redmond-Kirkland border (which is also the intersection of SR 908 and 132nd Avenue Northeast), SR 908 turned to the southeast and took the name Redmond Way. It descended until reaching Willows Road Northeast, at which point a view of the Sammamish River Valley appeared and the road's descent increased markedly. SR 908 then reached downtown Redmond, where it ended at its intersection with State Route 202. The road itself still continues for two blocks as Redmond Way/SR 202, a two-lane, one-way eastbound street, before becoming Redmond-Fall City Road/SR 202 and continuing to Fall City.

While SR 908 was officially classified as a child route of I-90, the two roadways never connected and were about 10 miles (16 km) apart. The child of I-90 classification is a result of SR 908's formation from SR 901, which did connect to I-90.

== History ==
SR 908 was created in 1971 from State Route 901 (which likewise no longer exists). At its creation, SR 908 extended from Redmond through Kirkland and south to intersect State Route 520, by way of Lake Street/Lake Washington Boulevard NE from Lake's intersection with Central Way in downtown Kirkland. Central Way had opened on December 22, 1965, bypassing the former route on Kirkland Way. (See the aforementioned article on SR 901 for the information.)

In 1989, as part of a Kirkland-led project to rebuild Lake Washington Boulevard, the state legislature considered decommissioning part of SR 908 and transfer ownership to the city; the bill failed to advance past the House Transportation Committee. On April 1, 1992, the path from SR 520 to I-405 was dropped from the state highway system. The remainder of the route was decommissioned as of June 10, 2010.

== Major intersections ==
The entire highway was in King County.

Location	mi	km	Destinations	Notes
Kirkland	0.00	0.00	I-405	Western terminus, interchange
Redmond	3.14	5.05	SR 202	Eastern terminus
1.000 mi = 1.609 km; 1.000 km = 0.621 mi
