= Talking Rain =

Beverage company

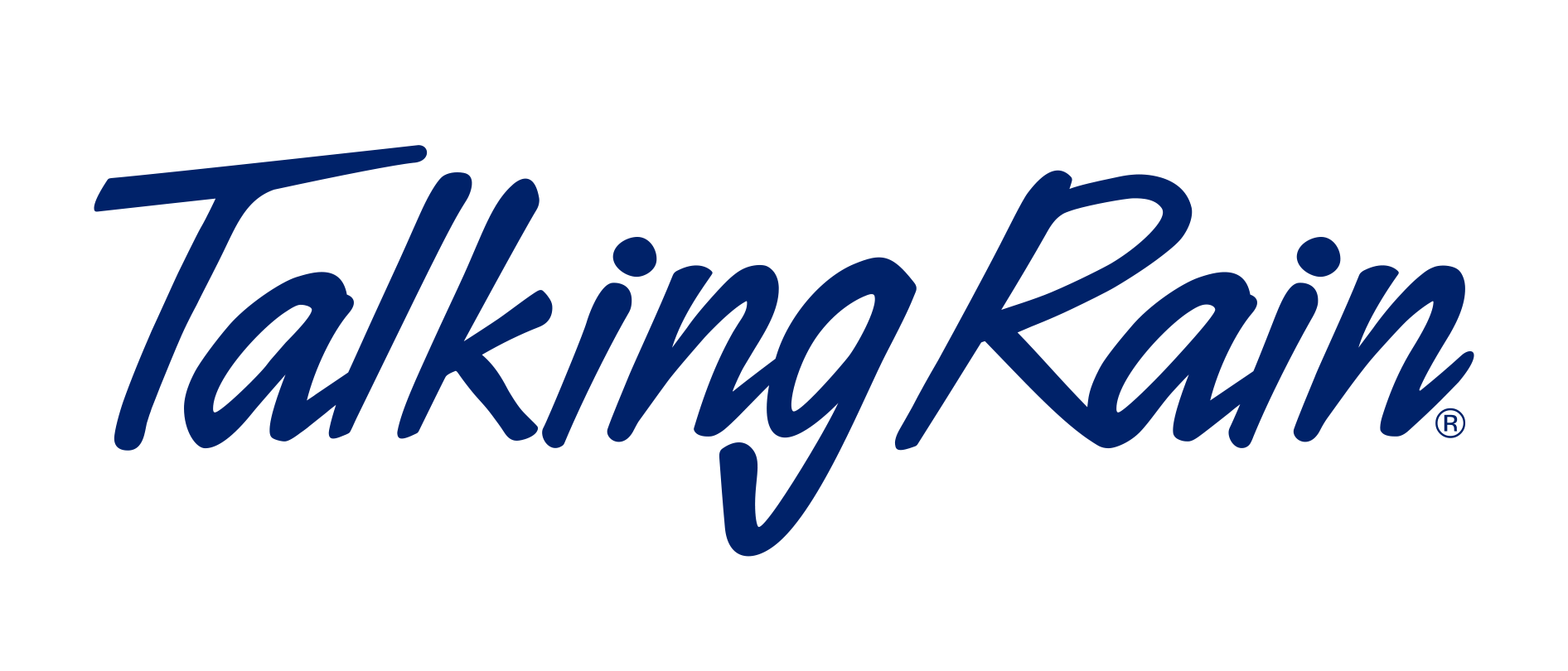
- Industry: Consumer packaged goods
- Founded: 1987
- Headquarters: Preston, Washington, United States
- Key people: Ken Sylvia CEO
- Products: Talking Rain Waters, Sparkling Ice
- Number of employees: 250-500
- Website: www.talkingrain.com

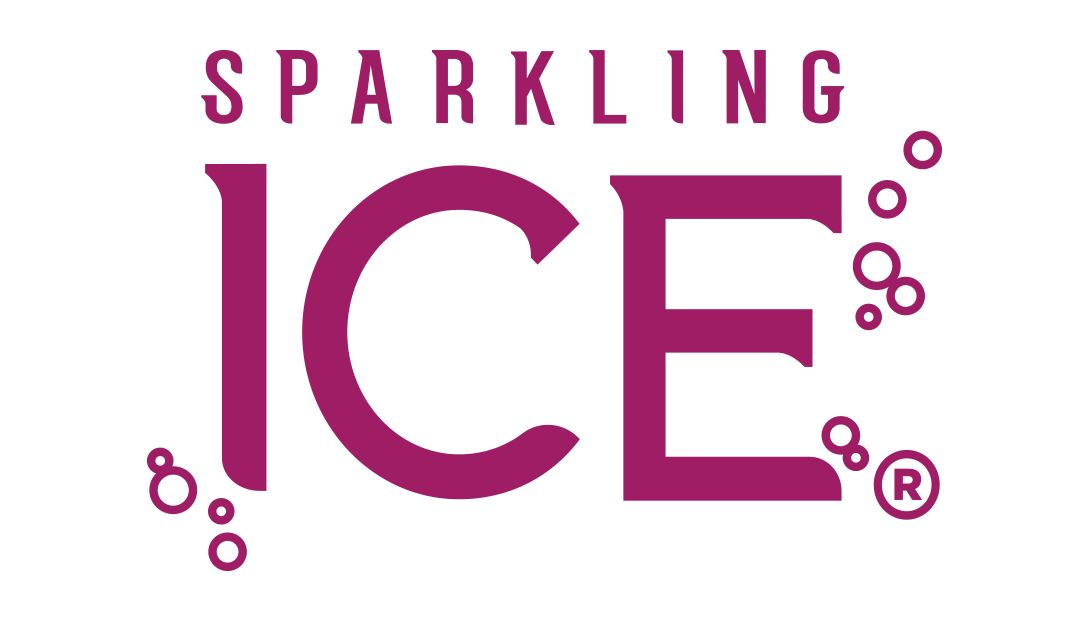
Sparkling Ice design trademark

Talking Rain is a privately held beverage company based in Preston, Washington that manufactures still and sparkling waters. Sparkling Ice accounts for the majority of their business.

== History ==
Talking Rain was founded in 1987 by John Stevens and Pete Hiskin in Bellevue, Washington. The company was bought six months later by investors Lawrence Hebner, Donald Kline, and Donald Jasper for $300,000. In 1992, the company began production of Sparkling Ice. They also moved to their current location in Preston, Washington that same year.

In 2014, Kevin Durant, the former Oklahoma City Thunder forward, signed an endorsement deal with Sparkling Ice under Roc Nation Sports.

In 2014, 2015, and 2016, the company was recognized in the Inc. 5000 list.

In August 2017, Talking Rain signed a distribution agreement with Tata Global Beverages to distribute Himalayan mineral water in the U.S.

Kevin Klock was president and CEO of the company from 2010 to 2017. Marcus Smith was interim CEO from the time of Kevin Klock's resignation until April 2018, when Chris Hall took over the position, and Smith became president of the company. Chris Hall was CEO of the company from 2018 to 2022. Board member and current Chief Operating Officer Ken Sylvia was named CEO, and he remains CEO today.

In 2018, Talking Rain launched a rebranded bottle label and changed the Sparkling Ice formula to include colors from natural sources.

In 2018, at 34th annual NHRA Arizona Nationals, Talking Rain announced a yearlong sponsorship of the NHRA Top Fuel Dragster driven by Leah Pritchett.

In January 2019, company introduced voice skill for Google Assistant and Amazon Alexa for consumers to check Sparking Ice cocktail and mocktail recipes.

According to Nielsen, as of June 15, 2019, Sparkling Ice had about $500 million in annual retail sales with a 14.9% increase in year-to-date dollar sales.

In April 2022, COO Ken Sylvia was promoted to CEO.

== Products ==
In 2006, they launched two more products, Twist and ActivWater, which were produced until 2011, when Talking Rain decided to focus their business on the Sparkling Ice; in 2018, Talking Rain generated $60 million in revenue, up 140% from the year before. In 2013, the beverage represented 95% of the company's sales.

In October 2018, Talking Rain released a caffeinated version of Sparkling Ice.

In May 2020, the company launched an alkaline water, Talking Rain Essentials Hydration Water in collaboration with Waterboys which was relaunched in 2021 as Talking Rain AQA.

In 2025, Talking Rain released Popwell, a prebiotic flavored soda. At time of release, consumers could choose from caffeinated options (including Lemon Lime, Cream Soda and Orange Cream), and non-caffeinated options (Blackberry Lime, Tropical Mango and Cherry Citrus). All Popwell sodas include roughly 25% the daily recommended value of fiber.
