= Snoqualmie Valley Regional Trail =

Rail trail in Washington

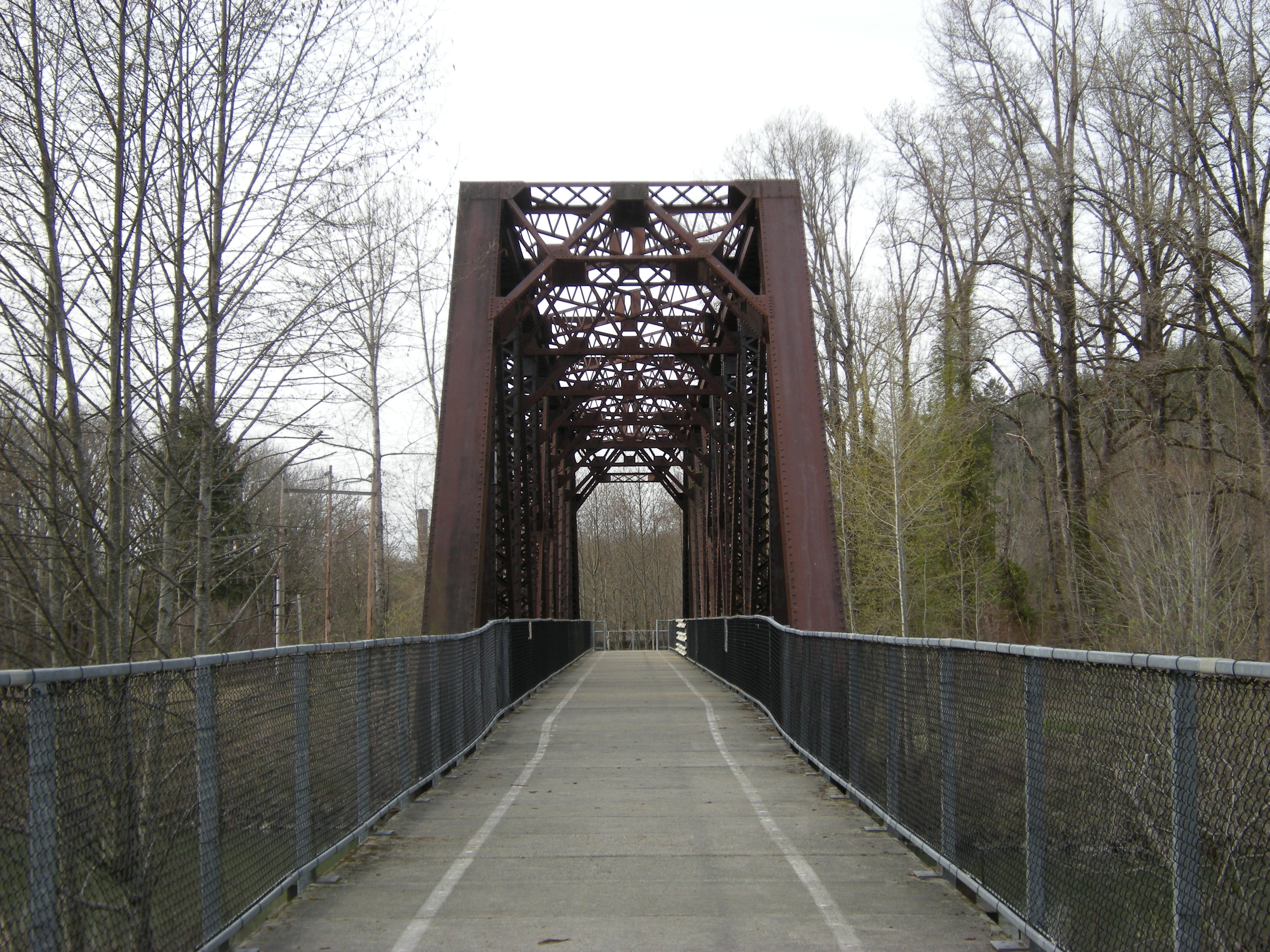
- Approaching Reinig Bridge
- Length: 29.0 miles (46.7 km)
- Location: King County, Washington

Trail map
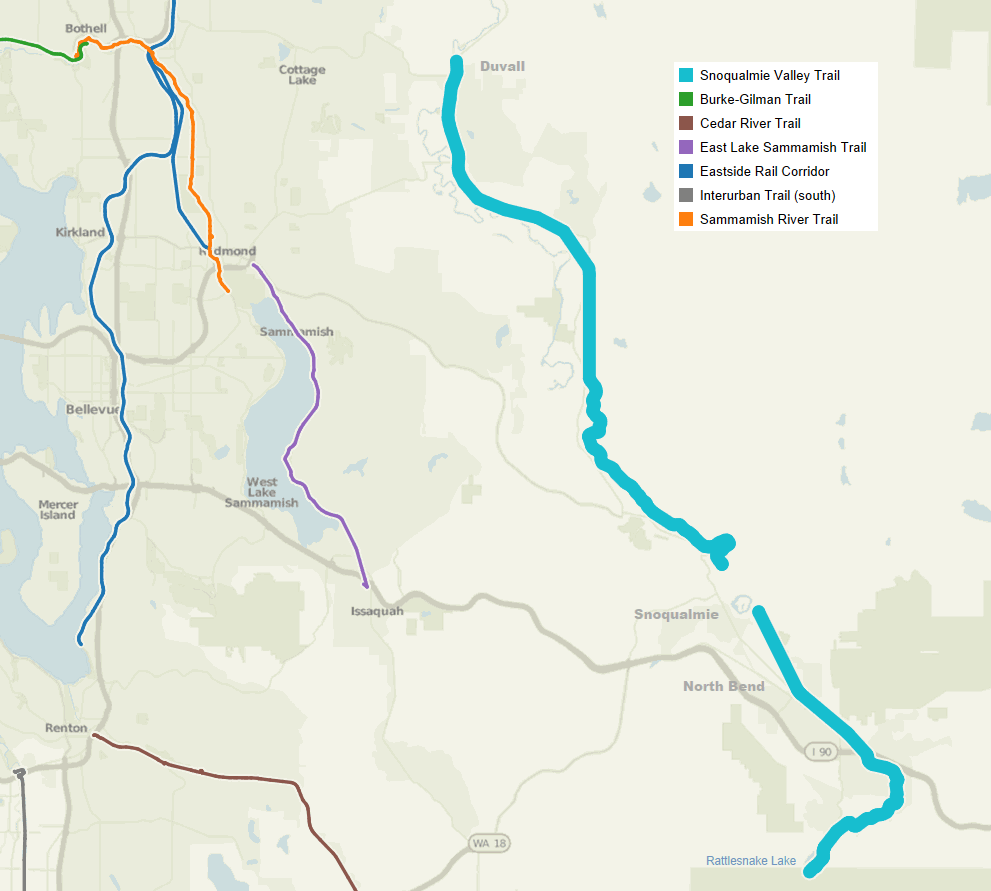
- Map of Snoqualmie Valley Regional Trail and other nearby rail trails

The Snoqualmie Valley Regional Trail is a rail trail in King County, Washington. The 29-mile (47 km) trail follows a portion of the former alignment of the Milwaukee Road, which was constructed in 1911 and abandoned in 1973.

The trail begins at Rattlesnake Lake outside of North Bend and ends at McCormick Park in Duvall.

== History ==
The Milwaukee Road constructed its Snoqualmie Valley branch in 1911, and began passenger service on April 21, 1912. Burlington Northern got trackage rights in 1974 and was sold the line in 1981 after the Milwaukee Road collapse. It was abandoned in 1990 by Burlington Northern.

== Route ==
The trail parallels Cedar Falls Road before it heads east passing Rainbow Lake and down through the Boxley Creek drainage where a trestle bridge crosses a tributary of Boxley Creek. The trail intersects the eastern edge of a subdivision and crosses the South Fork of the Snoqualmie River. The trail continues under I-90 and crosses North Bend Way, running through North Bend. The path progresses the Mt. Si Golf Course to Reinig Bridge which crosses the Snoqualmie River. The trail is interrupted by a short flight of 15 steps after the bridge. Users of the trail can re-access the main path by two different route connections.

The trail begins to head west and unofficially continues in an unimproved state for a quarter-mile east of Tokul Creek Road before reaching a gate at a property boundary. A further mile west, the trail crosses Tokul Creek Trestle situated over the Tokul Creek gorge. From there the path parallels Fall City Road through Carnation to the city of Duvall.

=== Access points ===
The access points to the trail are:

- Rattlesnake Lake, North Bend
- SE North Bend Way and SE Tanner Rd, North Bend
- NE 4th & Ballarat Ave, North Bend
- Three Forks off-leash Dog Park, Snoqualmie
- Tokul Creek SE, near Snoqualmie
- 356th Pl SE, near Fall City
- Nick Loutsis Park, Carnation
- McCormick Park, Duvall
