= Fall City Airport =

- IATA: none; ICAO: none; FAA LID: 1WA6

Summary
- Airport type: Private
- Operator: Fall City Airport Association
- Location: Fall City, Washington
- Elevation AMSL: 140 ft / 43 m
- Coordinates: 47°33′34″N 121°51′49″W
- Interactive map of Fall City Airport

Runways
Direction	Length		Surface
Direction	ft	m	Surface
E/W	2,064	629	asphalt/turf

Fall City Airport (FAA LID: 1WA6) is a private airport community located southeast of Fall City, Washington, United States. It has a single paved runway. The airport is operated by the Fall City Airport Association.
