= Ernie's Grove, Washington =

Unincorporated community in Washington, United States

- Unincorporated community
- Location in Washington and the United States Ernie's Grove (the United States)
- Coordinates: 47°32′06″N 121°44′43″W
- Country: United States
- State: Washington
- County: King
- Elevation: 463 ft (141 m)
- Time zone: UTC-8 (Pacific (PST))
  - Summer (DST): UTC-7 (PDT)
- ZIP codes: 98065
- GNIS feature ID: 1519375

Ernie's Grove is a small unincorporated community in King County, Washington, United States, near the North Fork of the Snoqualmie River outside the city of Snoqualmie.

== History ==
Between around 1915 and 1940 Ernie's Grove was a campground and cabin resort where people from Seattle went seeking respite from the big city. Some used to camp here and in the weekends people would pay 25 cents to drive through a log archway that was at 440th Avenue Southeast and settled in for Saturday or Sunday picnics. There were cabins along the North Fork of the Snoqualmie River which were sometimes booked up for weeks or even the entire summer.
