= Raging River =

River in the United States of America

Coordinates: 47°29′11.4″N 121°53′51.6″W

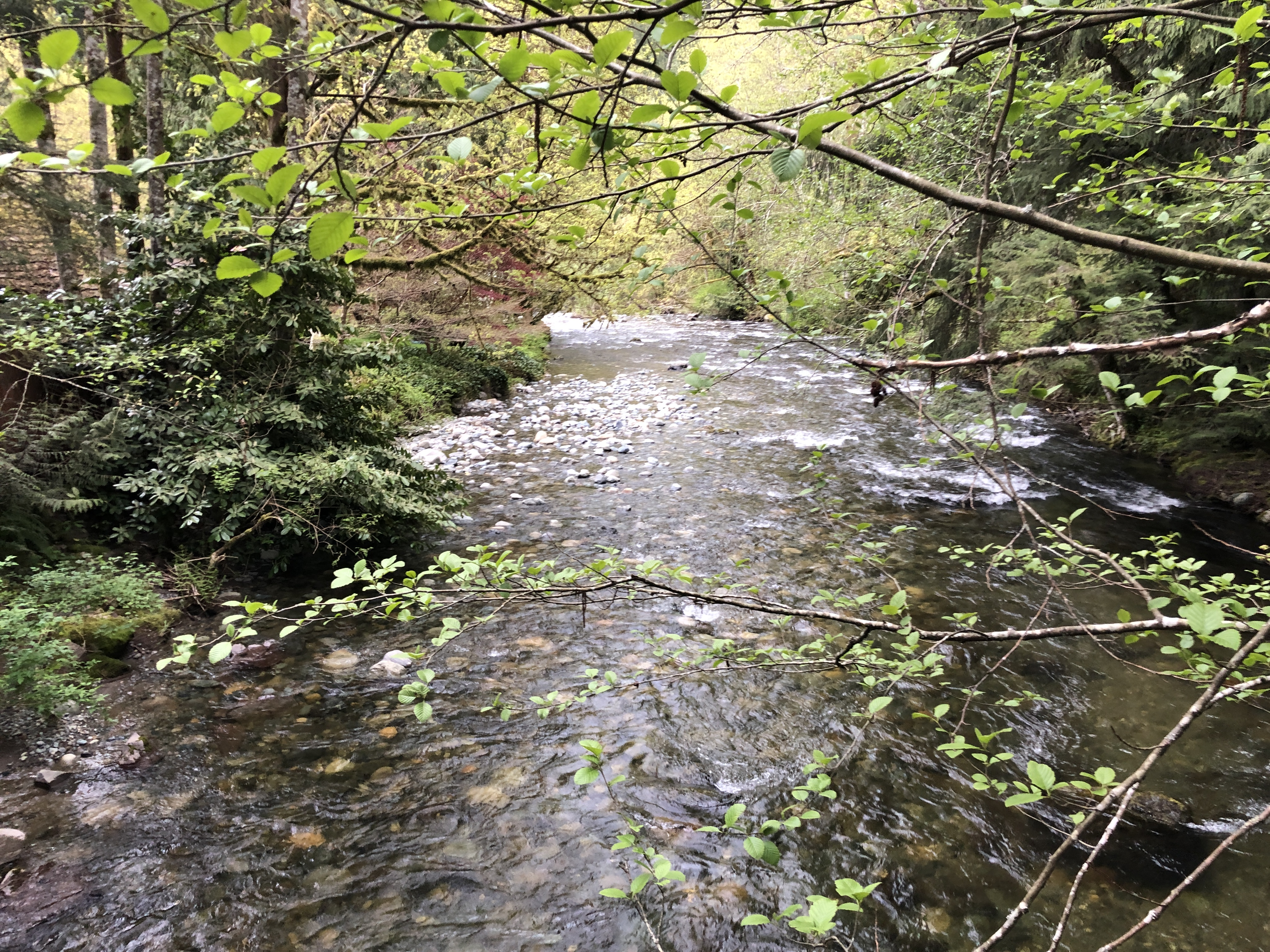
- Raging River upstream of Preston, Washington

Location
- Country: United States
- State: Washington
- County: King

Physical characteristics
- Source: Rattlesnake Ridge
- Mouth: Snoqualmie River
  - elevation: 80 ft (24 m)

Basin features
- Tributaries
  - left: Deep Creek
  - right: Canyon Creek, Lake Creek, Icy Creek

The Raging River is a 16-mile (26 km) tributary stream to the Snoqualmie River in King County, Washington, United States, draining a largely forested region of the Issaquah Alps in the foothills of the Cascade Range. The river has its headwaters at the southwestern face of Rattlesnake Ridge and flows generally north, taking in various smaller tributary streams as it descends into a valley. It turns northeast and enters a more heavily confined valley as it passes the community of Preston, before entering a large alluvial fan and draining into the Snoqualmie near Fall City. Much of the river's present course originates from faults and folds in the bedrock of the Issaquah Alps, which created drainage routes for glacial meltwater during the Vashon Glaciation. The river initially fed meltwater west into the Issaquah Creek drainage basin, but headcutting erosion diverted it into the Snoqualmie basin sometime around the end of the last ice age.

The river is an important spawning ground for chinook salmon and cutthroat trout. The river lies within the traditional territory of the Snoqualmie, a Coast Salish people, who gave the river the Lushootseed name YeLhʷ. Euro-American settlement began in the mid-1800s, accompanied by the start of logging operations across the watershed. The river's English name derives from its propensity for intense floods, with especially large floods occurring in 1932 and 1990. Dredging and levee construction in the 20th century were used as flood control measures, although both were halted or reversed in later decades out of environmental concern. Much of the upper watershed is privately-held timberland, while the lower basin is a mixture of state-held forestland and rural residential areas. Two major highways, Interstate 90 and Washington State Route 18, cross through the basin.

== Course ==
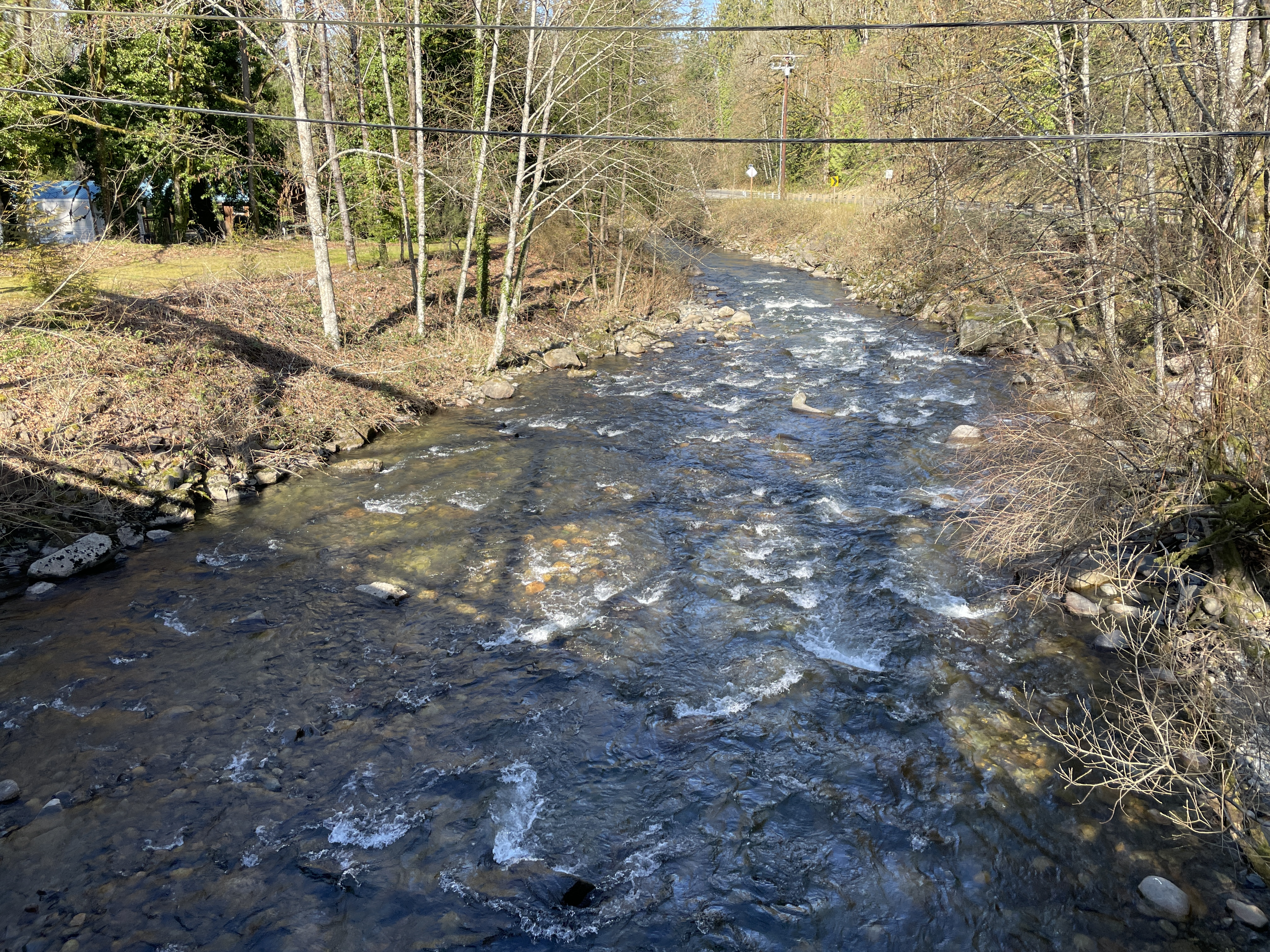
The Raging River in its lower course near Fall City

The Raging River originates from Rattlesnake Ridge, in the Issaquah Alps of King County, Washington, U.S., and flows generally northward for about 16 miles (26 km) before meeting with the Snoqualmie River at Fall City. The Raging River headwaters are on the southwestern face of Rattlesnake Ridge, about 2 mi (3.2 km) southwest of the city of North Bend.

The Raging River initially flows southward for a little over a mile, before turning west to enter a narrow gorge. After about 1.3 miles (2.1 km), it turns north into a wide glacial valley and takes in an unnamed 3-mile (4.8 km) tributary from the south. As it flows north through the valley, it takes in several tributaries, including an unnamed 2.2-mile (3.5 km) stream and the 2.2-mile (3.5 km) Canyon Creek from the east. Shortly after taking in Canyon Creek, it turns and begins a shallower descent. It mainly flows northwest, taking in tributaries such as Deep Creek and Lake Creek from the south and east respectively. About 4.5 miles (7.2 km) from the mouth, it passes near the community of Preston and turns northeast, flowing through a slightly steeper and more heavily confined valley. It takes in the 1.5-mile (2.4 km) Icy Creek as a tributary shortly after the turn.

The river exits the valley and flows through an alluvial fan for about 1.5 miles (2.4 km) before meeting the Snoqualmie River east of Fall City, with the confluence at an elevation of 80 feet (24 m) above sea level. The Snoqualmie River flows for about 36 miles (58 km) to the northwest after the confluence, before meeting the Skykomish River to form the Snohomish River. The Snohomish flows generally west, draining into the Puget Sound at the city of Everett.

== Hydrology ==
The Raging River has a drainage area of 32.0 square miles (83 km^{2}). It was named for its tendency to flood suddenly, owing to the steep slopes of the upper watershed. These floods can scour the streambed sediment. Flood control structures include a system of levees along the lower 1.5 miles (2.4 km) of the river, as well as a series of small revetments up to 8 miles (13 km) upstream from the mouth. Some riverbanks adjacent to roadways in the lower course have been armored.

Average flow rates for the river range from 100 to 200 cubic feet (2,800 to 5,700 L) per second during the winter season (from November to March). Flow rates tend to decline steeply between April and July, averaging only 10 to 20 cubic feet (280 to 570 L) per second in late summer. Most flooding occurs between November and February. The highest flood rate ever recorded on the river was in November 1990, where a river gauge measured 6,220 cubic feet (176 m^{3}) per second, over 300 times its summer average. A similar rate, predating gauge measurement, likely occurred during a 1932 flood. The flow rate of a 100-year flood (the largest flood expected to occur in a 100 year period) is estimated at 6,970 cubic feet (197 m^{3}) per second.

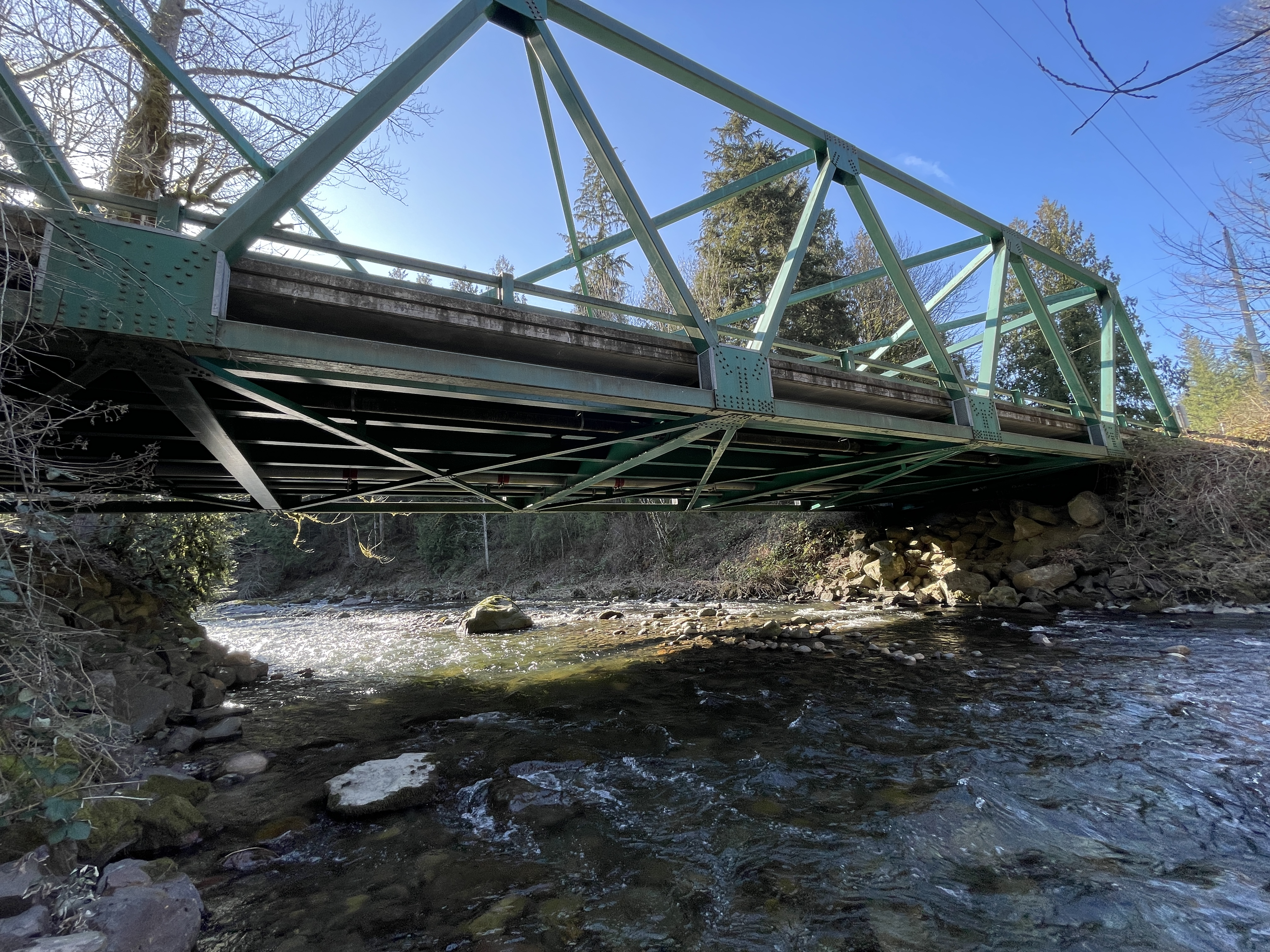
The 328th Way SE Bridge over the Raging River in Fall City

Extensive logging cleared old-growth forest along the Raging River, reducing the frequency of log jams and large wood debris. Fallen trees which span the river channel and some major accumulations of wood were noted along the river in a 2019 survey, but none of these formed a barrier to potential avulsion channels (alternate channels which the river may begin to flow through). The lack of wood debris causes the river to form few deep pools but many riffles. The river makes slight meanders in its lower course. In its upper course, the steep terrain allows the water to reach high velocities, resulting in extensive streambank erosion.

A 2008 survey found excessively high water temperatures across the lower portions of the river during the late summer and early fall. A potential threat to salmon spawning, these temperatures are likely exacerbated by the river's naturally high velocity and low flow rate during the summer. Surveys in the 1990s and 2000s also found anomalously high pH, attributed to a range of natural and man-made causes.

== Geology ==
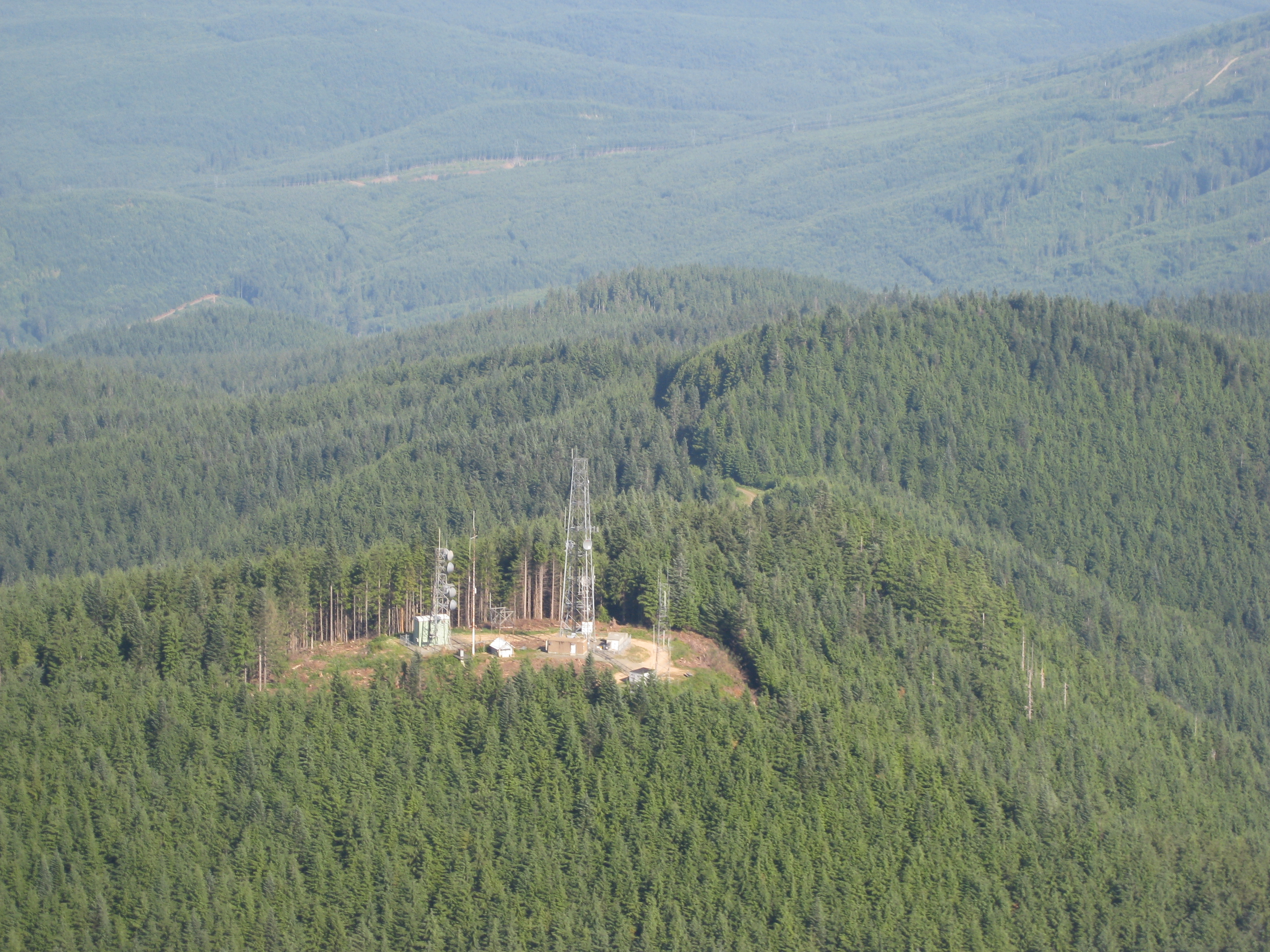
Tiger Mountain, one of the Issaquah Alps peaks which surround the Raging River basin

The Issaquah Alps, the uplands surrounding the Raging River, are a westward projection of foothills to the Cascade Range. These uplands are an uplifted formation of Eocene-era igneous and sedimentary rock crossed with various faults and folds. The repeated advance and retreat of glaciers in the Quaternary glaciation, weak areas of rock eroded and filled weak areas of rock in these uplands. This is likely the origin of a narrow slot canyon between 2.3 to 2.4 miles (3.7 to 3.9 km) upstream from its mouth. Glacial till sediments from prior glaciations is exposed along the river around 7 miles (11 km) from the mouth.

The whole watershed was covered by ice around 14,000 years ago during the peak of the Vashon Glaciation, the final of the region's glacial episodes, where much of Western Washington was covered by the Puget Lobe of the Cordilleran ice sheet. Glaciolacustrine deposits (sediment from glacial lakes) of gray silt and silty clay interrupted by sand and gravel lenses are found throughout the basin. Meltwater streams accompanying the advance and retreat of the Puget Lobe also produced large amounts of glacial outwash, depositing stratified material ranging from sand to boulders in size. Unstratified till was also deposited along the edges of ice sheets.

The large Glacial Lake Snoqualmie was formed as the Puget Lobe retreated. The Raging River, running through the Preston Channel along much of its present lower course, served as one of its major outlet channels. A drainage divide between Preston and Fall City separated this channel from the Snoquamie watershed. Instead, the Raging River carried meltwater into what is now East Fork Issaquah Creek into the Lake Sammamish watershed. Headcutting erosion, either during the final stages of the retreat or after it, diverted the river into the Snoqualmie watershed through a steep and relatively narrow inicison.

Following the glaciations, the Raging river deposited extensive alluvium. Together with landslide debris and colluvium (sediments deposited at the base of hills), these line the river for much of its course. Older portions of alluvium tend to be sandy gravel mixed with cobbles, which form terraces along the river. In the upper valley, these sit between 30 to 60 feet (9 to 18 m) above the present water level, while they lie between 15 to 25 feet (5 to 8 m) above the river along its lower course. The river has formed a large alluvial fan in the final 1.5 miles (2.4 km) of its course, underlying Fall City. The fan extends up to 3,600 feet (1,100 m) from the river to the west and 1,800 feet (550 m) to the east. The river channel shows little sign of recent migration across this fan: maps of the river in 1936 and 1873 generally align with its present course, excepting for human modifications.

== Biology ==
The Raging River is among the main spawning areas for Chinook salmon in the Snoqualmie watershed. Habitat restoration efforts in the watershed have focused on protecting and improving habitats for salmon spawning. Although no data of benthic invertebrate distribution was available for the main stem, a survey of a tributary stream over the early 2000s found satisfactory and improving levels of invertebrate numbers and diversity, an important sign of habitat quality. As with other major tributaries to the Snoqualmie downstream of Snoqualmie Falls, large numbers of oceanic cutthroat trout spawn in the Raging River.

== Human history ==
The Raging River and the broader Snoqualmie watershed is within the traditional territory of the eponymous Snoqualmie people, a Lushootseed-speaking Coast Salish group. The Lushootseed name for the Raging River, as recorded by T. T. Waterman in the early 1900s, is YeLhʷ. Scant archaeological data is available for the early habitation in the Snoqualmie basin, but around 500 BCE, indigenous groups began intensive hunting, gathering, and fishing in the region. Semi-sedentary groups later established permanent villages, often around river mouths and confluences. Prior to Euro-American settlement in the 1800s, a large Snoqualmie village was located at the Raging River's confluence with the Snoqualmie at what is now Fall City. The Puget Sound region came under the control of the United States in the mid-1800s, with settlers claiming territory under the Donation Land Claim Act. Euro-American settlement led to the 1855–1856 Puget Sound War against the Coast Salish and the construction of American forts along the Snoqualmie basin. The Snoqualmie were signatories of the 1855 Treaty of Point Elliott, ceding the region to American control.

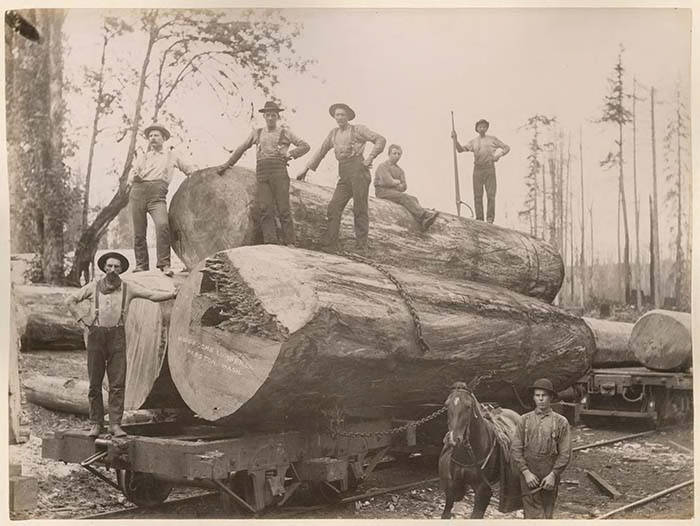
Lumber workers with logs loaded on to a rail car near Preston, c. 1890

Settlers in the mid-to-late 1800s began logging in both the Raging River valley and the surrounding uplands, building sawmills, roads, and later houses and railroads to support their activities. Homesteads were built at the mouth of the river in 1869, with the Fall City post office opening alongside additional settlers in the early 1870s. From 1900 to 1932, large areas of the watershed southeast of Preston were logged, especially in the basins of Canyon Creek and Deep Creek. Logging on the hills between Preston and Fall City continued until around 1960.

The river flooded greatly in 1932, breaking a small dam upstream of Preston and creating two landslides along the river. This spurred the constriction of levees armored with riprap along lower portions of the Raging River from 1939 to 1941, accompanying dredging, channelization and straightening.

During the early 1960s, these levees were raised and reinforced. The King County flood control program removed logs from inhabited portions of the river and gravel from its mouth in 1960s; within 30 years, gravel bars had reemerged at the mouth and within levees, with many stabilized by plant growth. Extensive dredging continued until the late 1960s, when it was halted due to environmental concerns. The county ended log clearing efforts on the river around 1980, due to budget difficulties and environmental concerns. However, limited log cutting and logjam clearing by residents and county services continued. Large areas of the upper watershed—about 25% of the total drainage area—became subject to intensive logging beginning in the 1970s, and expanding during the late 1980s.

In 2006, a habitat restoration program removed the Carlin levee near Preston, opening up several acres of the river's floodplain and creating a suitable spawning area for salmonids.

=== Modern land use ===
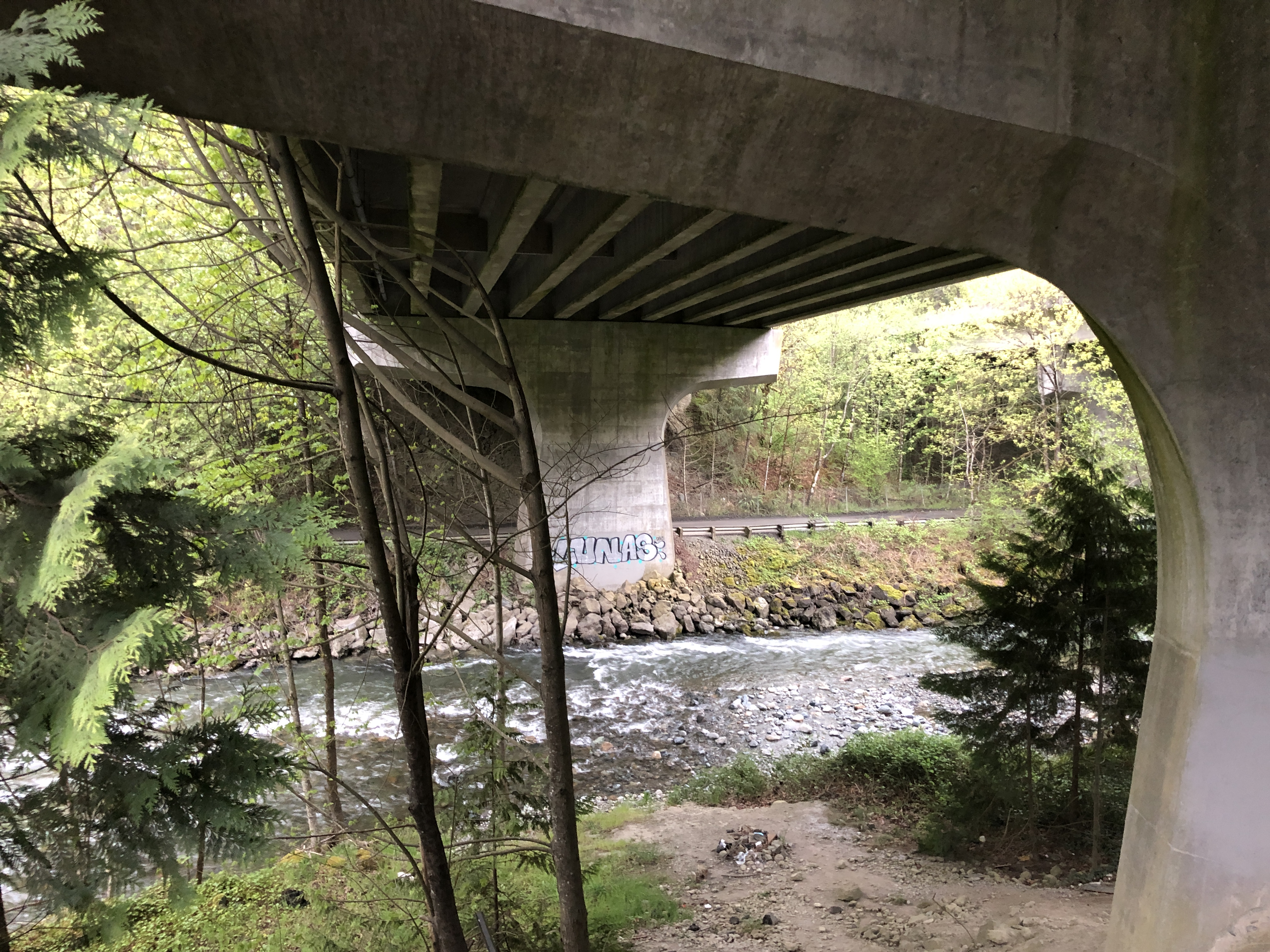
Interstate 90 crossing over the river in Preston

The Raging River lies within unincorporated areas of King County. Most of the watershed (73%) is zoned for timber production, while 23% is designated as rural areas. Less than 1% is zoned for residential, mixed-use, or commercial usage, with residences on 0.25-to-10-acre (1,000-to-40,500 m^{2}) parcels distributed around the lower 7 miles (11 km) of the river's course. The main communities around the river are the unincorporated communities of Preston and Fall City, the latter mainly outside of the drainage area at the river's mouth. Portions of the Snoqualmie Ridge planned community, situated on a high plateau, lie within the watershed. The steep and mountainous geography of the region constrain urban development.

Portions of the Interstate 90 and Washington State Route 18 highways run through the Raging River watershed. Two smaller routes, Upper Preston Road and Preston–Fall Creek Road, run along the river for portions of its lower course. As of 2019, eight bridges cross the Raging River, with the lowest on its course at Fall City at 0.5 miles (800 m) from the mouth, and the highest 7 miles (11 km) further upstream. A flood in 1990 destroyed a bridge 5.2 miles (8.4 km) upstream from the mouth; the bridge was never replaced.

Much of the watershed is under state ownership, although most of the timberland in the upper watershed is privately owned. The city of Seattle owns portions of the southwestern fringes of the watershed, aiming to protect the water quality of the adjacent Chester Morse Lake and Cedar River system. Large blocks of forestland, including some rural residential areas, are owned by the Washington State Department of Natural Resources.
