= Snoqualmie Valley =

Geographical region in the U.S.

Coordinates: 47°36′20″N 121°55′17″W

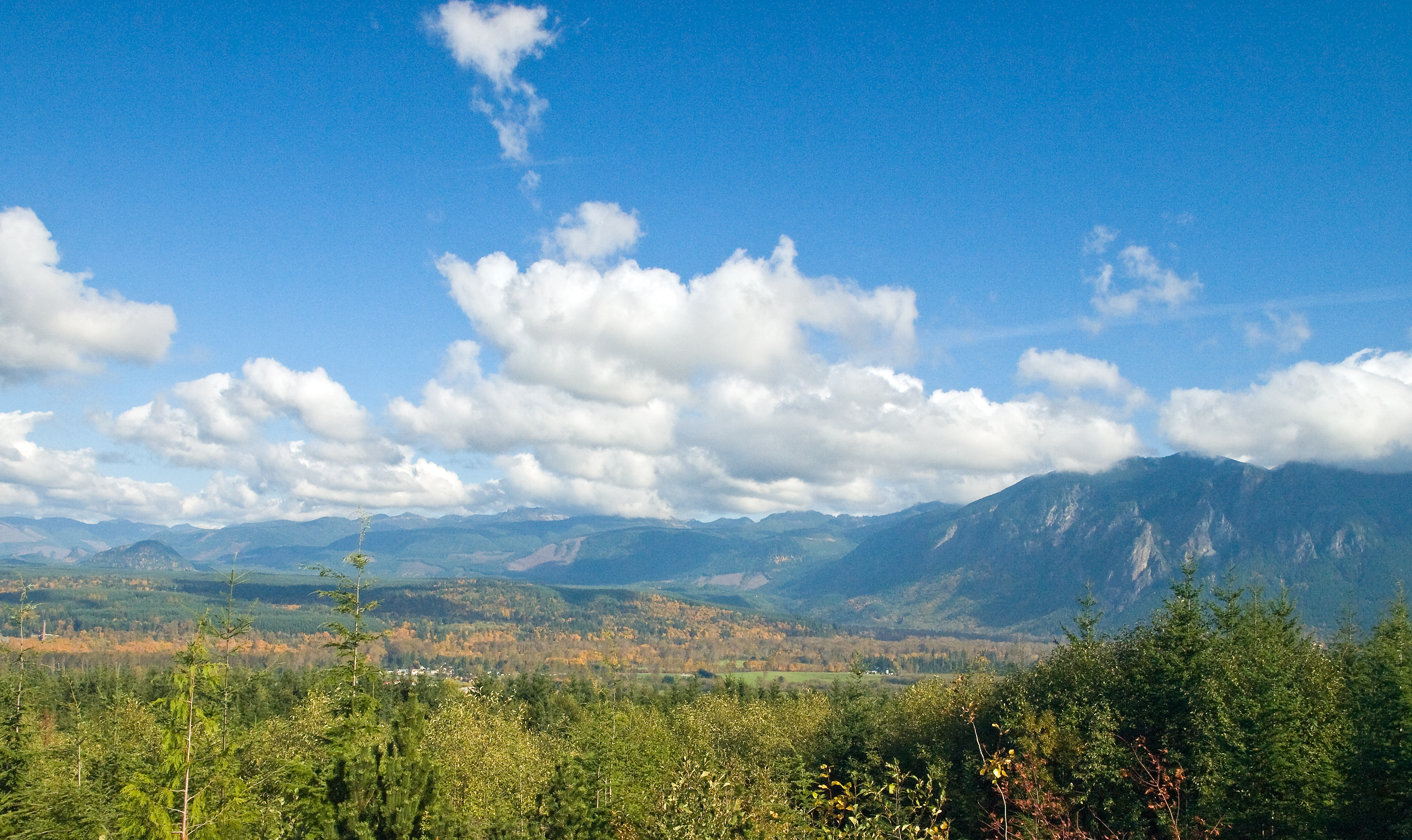
Snoqualmie Point Park is part of the Snoqualmie Valley.

The Snoqualmie Valley is a farming and timber-producing region located along the Snoqualmie River in Western Washington, United States. The valley stretches from the confluence of the three forks of the river at North Bend to the confluence of the Snoqualmie River and the Skykomish River (home to the Skykomish / Skai-whamish, a Snoqualmie band), forming the Snohomish River at Monroe.

Hops were the major crop of this region in the late 19th century.

The valley is the ancestral home of the Snoqualmie people. The name Snoqualmie comes from the native word for "Moon the Transformer" and originates in the creation myth of the Snoqualmie people.

== Culture ==
This stretch of the river includes Snoqualmie Falls. Towns in the valley are North Bend, Snoqualmie, Preston, Fall City, Carnation, and Duvall.

David Lynch's show Twin Peaks was filmed in the area including Snoqualmie, North Bend, and Fall City.

== Transportation ==
The eastern side of the Snoqualmie Valley is served by State Route 203, which runs from Fall City to Monroe.
