= Preston, Washington =

Unincorporated community in Washington, United States

- Unincorporated community
- Location in the United States Location in Washington
- Coordinates: 47°31′25″N 121°55′37″W
- Country: United States
- State: Washington
- County: King
- Elevation: 430 ft (130 m)

Population (2000)
  - Total: 322
- Time zone: UTC-8 (Pacific (PST))
  - Summer (DST): UTC-7 (PDT)
- ZIP codes: 98027
- Area code: 425
- GNIS feature ID: 1524632

Preston is an unincorporated and exurban community in the northwest United States, located 22 miles (35 km) east of Seattle in King County, Washington. It was named after railway official William T. Preston.

Preston is a historic mill town on the northeast edge of the large Tiger Mountain State Forest, along Interstate 90. Preston, elevation 430 ft (130 m), is located within commuting distance of Seattle and Bellevue.

The local Raging River feeds into the Snoqualmie River at Fall City, and offers recreational activities like fly-fishing and swimming. Eastside Fire & Rescue has an all-volunteer fire station, Station 74, staffed by residents of Preston and nearby communities, which serves the Preston area.

The Preston Community Club is a volunteer organization that was created to unite and protect the historic Preston community by organizing town events and acting as liaisons to local and state government. Several small stores have popped up as the area has grown, such as the Preston General store, Indoor Garden & Lighting, Coffee Too!, Subway, and the Preston Post Office. Several larger companies have taken advantage of Preston's accessibility, such as bottled water company Talking Rain, SanMar, and Platt.

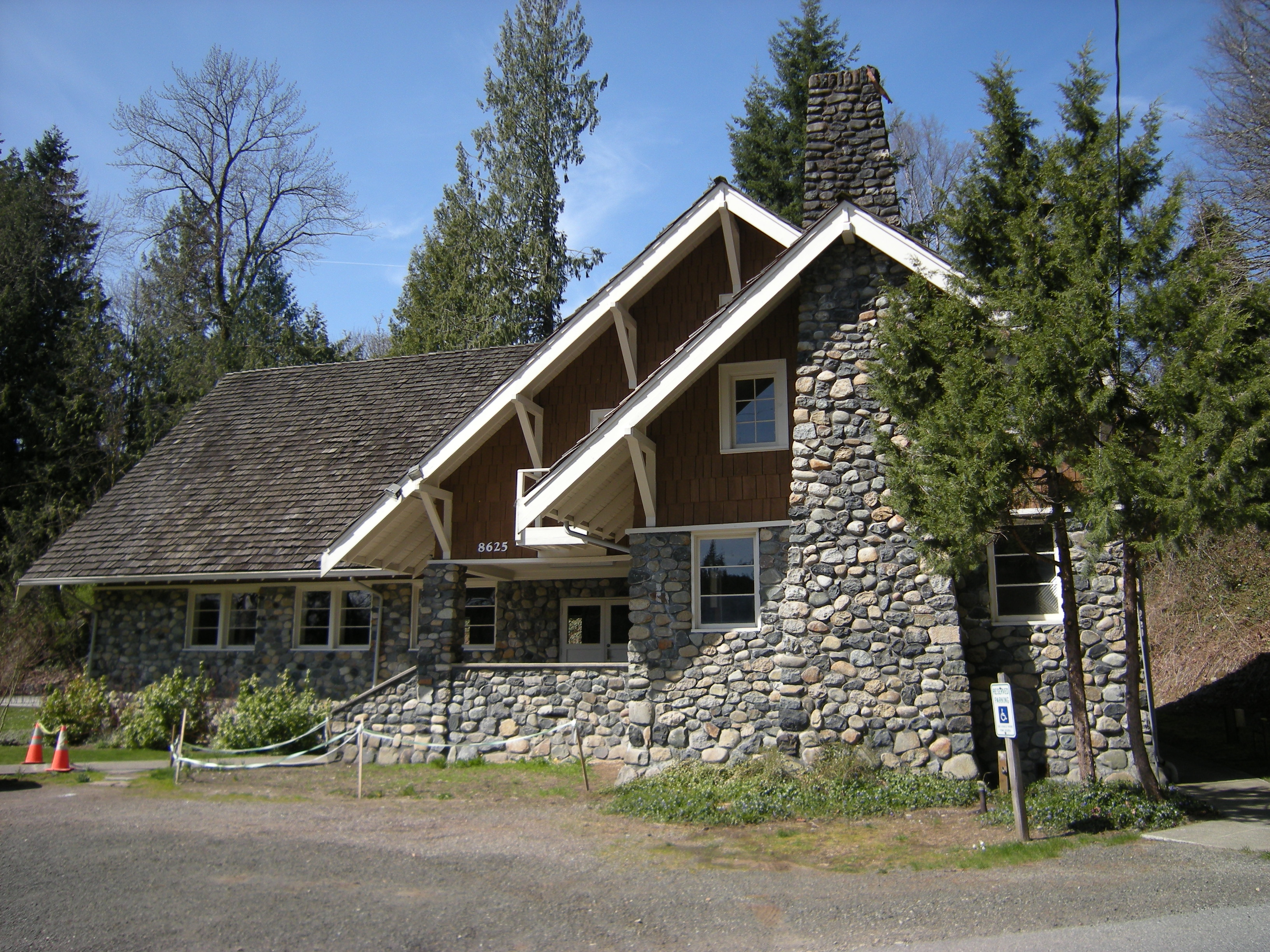
The Preston Community Clubhouse, built as a Works Projects Administration project in 1939, is listed on the National Register of Historic Places.
