= Franklin Elementary School =

Ben Franklin Elementary

Location
- 12434 NE 60th St; Kirkland, Washington 98033; United States; 47°39′43″N 122°10′24″W

Information
- Type: Public
- Established: 1967
- School district: Lake Washington School District
- Principal: Keith Buechler
- Grades: K-5
- Enrollment: 480 (2024)
- Student to teacher ratio: 15:1
- Mascot: Eagle
- Feeder to: Rose Hill Middle School; Lake Washington High School
- Website: franklin.lwsd.org

Benjamin Franklin Elementary School is an elementary school located in the Bridle Trails neighborhood in Kirkland, Washington. It is located across the street from Bridle Trails State Park. The school serves students from K through 5th grade as part of the Lake Washington School District. It is a feeder school to Rose Hill Middle School in Redmond, Washington and Lake Washington High School.

== History and facilities ==
Franklin Elementary school was originally designed by local architects Cummings & Martenson, who also designed many area municipality buildings, medical facilities, and churches, the YMCA, several buildings on the Naval Air Station Whidbey Island, and many other local elementary schools. It was built in 1967.

In 2004, Mahlum Architects designed new facilities for the school. It was built and opened in 2005. In 2006, The Committee on the Environment of American Institute of Architects awarded the new school as one of its Top Ten Green Buildings. It also received a merit award from the Seattle chapter. The new building used sustainable design practices such as excess Carbon dioxide removal through automated fresh air intake, daylighting, a stormwater management system, waterless urinals, and small learning environments. The redesigned school has been a case study in architectural and educational design.

In 2012, the school was converted from K-6 to K-5 with the district's change from junior and senior high schools to middle schools and four-year high schools.

Franklin Elementary was recognized by King County for its participation in the Green Schools program in 2013 for its conservation and recycling efforts.

In 2014, Symetra and the Seattle Seahawks honored Kindergarten teacher Emily Morgan with a Symetra Heroes in the Classroom award. In 2018, choir teacher Shawna Sandstrom received the same honor.

In 2022, the elementary school hosted a launch of former student's project to educate its students about the Internment of Japanese Americans. The Tesla STEM High School student, Kai Vanderlip, worked with Franklin Elementary's librarian Leann Clawson to found the Day of Remembrance Japanese Incarceration Literature for Libraries. The school was granted an inclusive libraries grant in the months that followed. Japanese artist Alice Van Leunen's 1989 Mingei Crazy Quilt made of hand-printed Chiyogami paper hangs in the library.

== Academics and demographics ==
Franklin Elementary ranked #208 of Washington elementary schools in 2024. It has a 63% minority enrollment.

=== QUEST Program ===
In 1985, Washington State Legislature enacted a law requiring schools to provide equitable program for students identified as highly capable, or gifted. Students are identified as having "exceptional cognitive and academic ability." Programs are required to provide accelerated instruction, activities, and services to students without removing them from their peer environments, which involves after-school programs or moving identified students into the grade ahead through mixed-grade classrooms. Brigitte Tennis, a teacher in the QUEST program until 2000, was inducted into the National Teachers Hall of Fame in 2015.

Franklin Elementary's highly capable program, the QUEST program, which had 91 students enrolled in 2014 began when the law was enacted. In 1999, 11 out of 19 fifth-grade QUEST students won national writing awards out of 115 entries. In 2016, the district ended the program at Franklin Elementary, forcing students identified as highly capable to relocate to elementary schools outside of their attendance area. Parents started a petition in response to news of the closure, but the district informed them that there was no longer enough space in the school to accommodate the program.

=== Extracurricular activities ===
Franklin Elementary students can participate in Eagle Leaders, a student leadership program, the Safety Patrol Officers program, the Green Team (conservation and sustainability club), and Rainbow club, a LGBT community that promotes anti-bullying.

==== Space Eagles ====
In 1985, teacher Carolyn Carpp, the Vice President of the Board of Directors of the Ninety-Nines (an international organization of women pilots), began the Young Astronauts program at Franklin Elementary. The program was administered by NASA through a national program established by the White House Office. The club, for grades 3-6, participated in the Pacific Science Center's AstroAdventures, an astronomy curriculum through a NASA grant for grades 3-12. From 1987 through 2000, the program included a yearly overnight "camp-in" at the science center and space-themed workshops. Booth Gardner, the governor, proclaimed the week of March 12–18 to be Young Astronaut Week in 1989 when Carpp orchestrated the creation of the Puget Sound Council of Young Astronauts to bring the area's clubs together for the annual camp-in. For her work on the Young Astronauts program, Carrp won an Aerospace Education Award from the Washington Wing Civil Air Patrol in 1989.

In 2000, the club focused on aviation and aerospace and it was renamed to the Young Aviators. It incorporated the Young Eagles curriculum from the Experimental Aircraft Association. Club members visited McChord Field and the Museum of Flight. By 2008, Carpp had given over 300 students their first flights through the club.

== Notable alumni ==
Jeffrey Dean Morgan, American actor
