= Jeffrey Dean Morgan =

American actor (born 1966)

- Morgan at the 2026 San Diego Comic-Con
- Born: April 22, 1966 (age 60); Seattle, Washington, U.S.
- Occupation: Actor
- Years active: 1991–present
- Spouses: Anya Longwell (m. 1992; div. 2003) Hilarie Burton (m. 2019)
- Partner: Mary-Louise Parker (2006–2008)
- Children: 2

Jeffrey Dean Morgan (born April 22, 1966) is an American actor. He is best known for playing the character Negan in the AMC horror drama series The Walking Dead (2016–2022) and its spin-off The Walking Dead: Dead City (2023–present), for both of which he has received critical acclaim.

He also appeared in television roles including John Winchester in the CW fantasy horror series Supernatural (2005–2008; 2019), Denny Duquette in the ABC medical drama series Grey's Anatomy (2006–2009), Jason Crouse in the CBS political drama series The Good Wife (2015–2016), Joe Kessler in the Amazon Prime Video adult superhero series' The Boys (2024–2026), and Conquest in Invincible (2025–2026).

His film roles include William Gallagher in P.S. I Love You (2007), the Comedian in the superhero film Watchmen (2009), Clay in The Losers (2010), Sgt. Maj Andrew Tanner in Red Dawn (2012), and Agent Harvey Russell in Rampage (2018). He also starred as a pivotal character in the History Channel's miniseries about the war with Mexico for the creation of Texas, Texas Rising (2015).

== Early life and education ==
Morgan was born in Seattle, Washington, to Sandy Thomas and Richard Dean Morgan.

Morgan grew up in Kirkland, Washington, and attended Ben Franklin Elementary School, where he participated in his first theatre experience. He also attended Rose Hill Junior High.

In 1984, Morgan graduated from Lake Washington High School, where he was captain of the basketball team.

Morgan briefly attended Skagit Valley College to pursue a career in basketball. Following a leg injury that ended his hope of becoming a professional player, he left school to pursue his other interests, such as painting and writing.

While living in Seattle, Morgan sold paintings and completed his first acting roles, Uncaged (1991) and To Cross the Rubicon (1991), the latter with his roommate, actor Billy Burke.

Several years later, while helping a friend move from Seattle to Los Angeles, intending only to stay for a weekend, he decided to live there permanently to pursue acting: "I fell into acting, found out I had a little talent, and pursued it."

== Career ==
Starting with Uncaged (1991), Morgan has appeared in over 25 feature films. However, the bulk of his work has been in television. He was a major character in the 1996–97 television series The Burning Zone, appearing in eleven of its nineteen episodes.

In 2005 and 2006, Morgan simultaneously appeared in three television series: in the CW series Supernatural as John Winchester, in a recurring role on ABC's Grey's Anatomy as heart transplant patient Denny Duquette, and as Judah Botwin in two episodes of the Showtime series Weeds. He has also guest-starred in a number of television series, including ER, JAG, Walker, Texas Ranger, Angel, CSI: Crime Scene Investigation, Sliders, The O.C. and Monk. In 2007, Morgan was cast in a proposed project by Grey's Anatomy creator Shonda Rhimes. The series, tentatively titled "Correspondents", was to have started production in summer 2007. ABC instead picked up a spin-off of Grey's Anatomy, called Private Practice, that was also created by Rhimes. As a result, "Correspondents" was shelved.

In 2007, Morgan starred in the film The Accidental Husband, which finished filming in March 2007 and was released on DVD in 2009.

Jeffrey starred in the thriller The Resident in 2011. He also appeared in the drama film Days of Wrath in 2008.

In 2009, Morgan portrayed The Comedian, a cigar-chomping antihero in Watchmen, based on Alan Moore's graphic novel. In the same year, Morgan appeared in Taking Woodstock, and played Clay in a comic book film adaptation of The Losers. He also played Jeb Turnbull in the DC comic book film Jonah Hex, in an uncredited appearance.

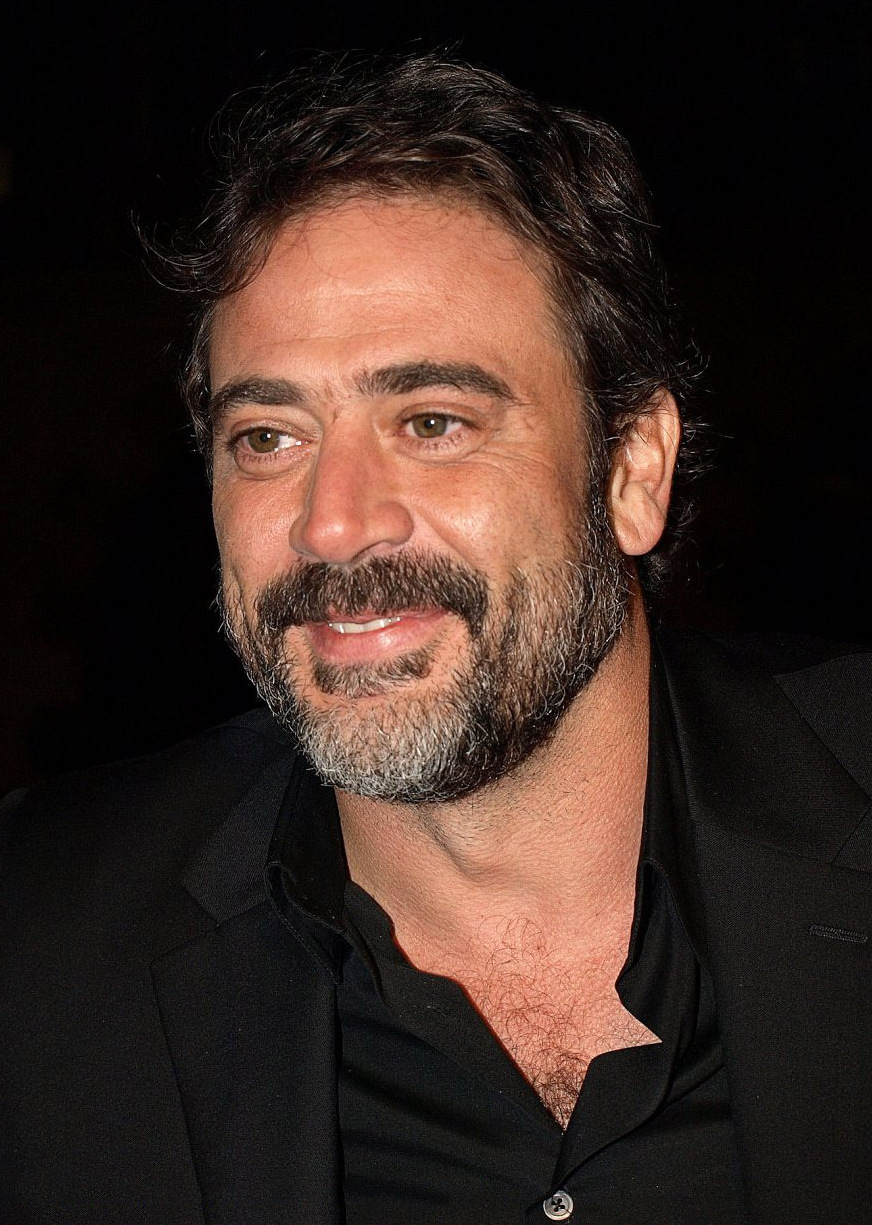
Morgan at the premiere of Watchmen in 2009

Morgan appeared in the crime thriller Texas Killing Fields as a homicide detective in 2011. The following year, Morgan starred in the television drama series Magic City, which centered on mob life in 1950s Miami. The same year, Morgan starred in the horror-thriller The Possession and had a supporting role in the war film Red Dawn.

In 2014, Morgan played Charlie Peters, the owner of the Cake House, in the season finale of Shameless.

In November 2014, Morgan was cast as Joe DiMaggio opposite Kelli Garner as Marilyn Monroe in The Secret Life of Marilyn Monroe, a Lifetime four-hour miniseries based on J. Randy Taraborrelli's book of the same name.

In 2015, Morgan portrayed Deaf Smith in Texas Rising, a five-part mini-series which aired on the History Channel. Also in 2015, Morgan became a regular cast member for season 2 of the CBS sci-fi drama Extant. He appeared in an uncredited role in Batman v Superman: Dawn of Justice, as Bruce Wayne's father, Thomas Wayne.

In 2015, Morgan took on the role of freelance investigator Jason Crouse, opposite Julianna Margulies, in the CBS TV series The Good Wife, until that series concluded in the spring of 2016. That year Morgan began his most noted role to date, as Negan on the AMC TV series The Walking Dead. He made his first appearance in the sixth-season finale on April 3, 2016, serving as the primary antagonist of the seventh and eighth seasons and later an anti-hero since the ninth season. He later lent his voice to the character when he was added as DLC in the fighting game Tekken 7. In 2015, he had a lead role in Jonás Cuarón's thriller film Desierto.

On May 28, 2017, Morgan drove the 2017 Chevrolet Corvette Grand Sport Pace Car to lead the starting field of the 101st Indianapolis 500. In September, Morgan appeared in a commercial for the online game Evony.

Morgan was 5th billed in the Dwayne Johnson film Rampage, released in April 2018.

Morgan reprised his role as John Winchester in the thirteenth episode of the fourteenth season of Supernatural, which was also the 300th episode of the series. It aired on February 7, 2019.

In August 2022, Morgan was cast in the fourth season of The Boys; while initially reported to be a recurring role, on the season's release in 2024, Morgan was credited as a main cast member, portraying "Joe Kessler", revealed in an episode to be a hallucination/alter ego of Billy Butcher.

In 2025, Morgan hosted the reality show Destination X.

== Personal life ==
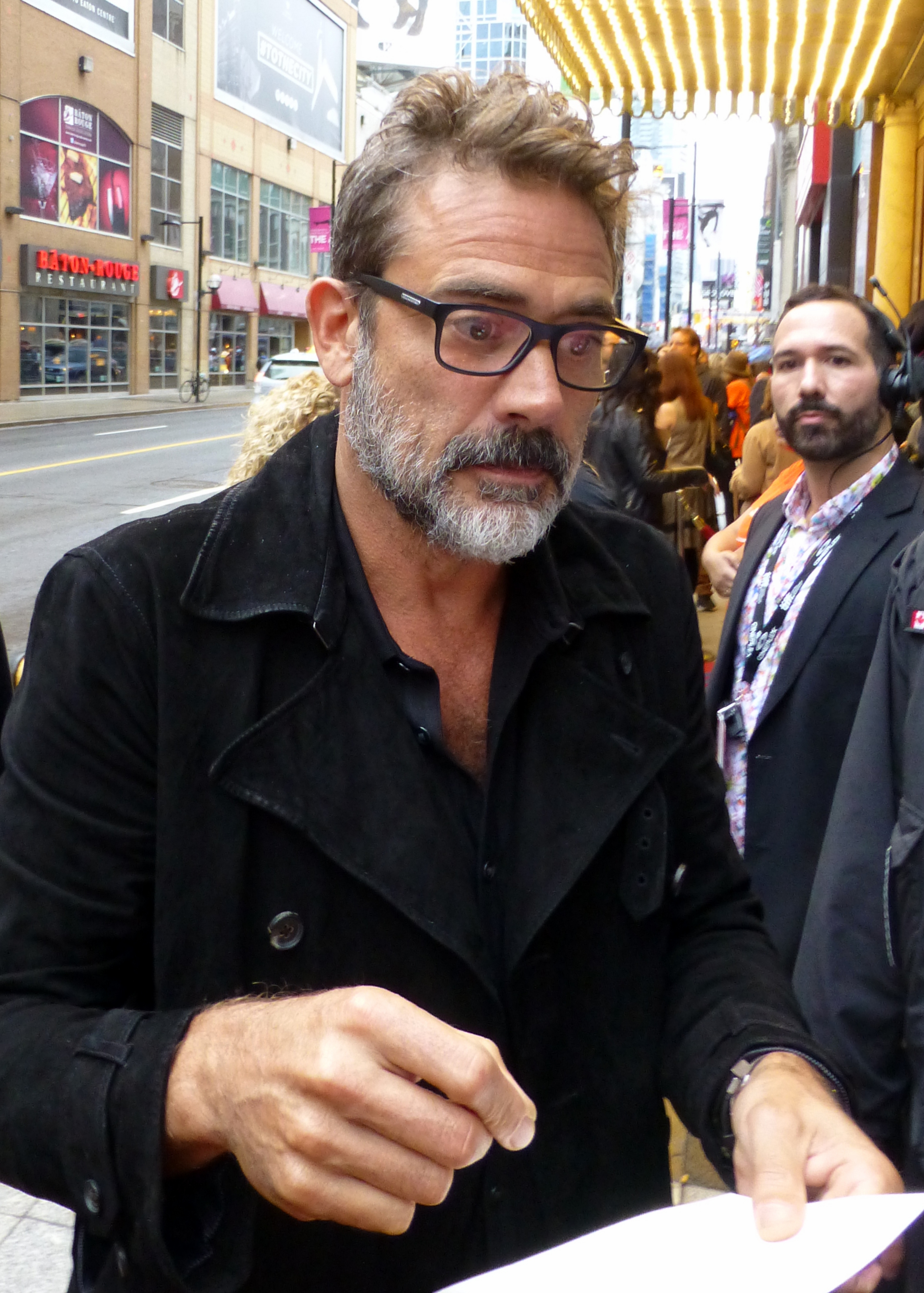
Morgan at the 2015 Toronto Film Festival.

From 1992 to 2003, Morgan was married to actress Anya Longwell.

In 2007, Morgan was briefly engaged to his former Weeds co-star Mary-Louise Parker; their engagement ended in April 2008.

In 2009, Morgan started a relationship with actress Hilarie Burton after being set up on a blind date through his Supernatural co-star Jensen Ackles and Ackles's wife, Danneel, with whom Burton co-starred on One Tree Hill. The couple's son was born on March 14, 2010. On February 16, 2018, eight years later, Morgan and Burton's daughter was born.

On October 5, 2019, Morgan and Burton were married, although many had erroneously speculated they had already been married since 2014. The wedding was officiated by Ackles and Norman Reedus.

Morgan and Burton have made their home in Rhinebeck in Dutchess County, New York, on a 100-acre (40-hectare) working farm in the Hudson Valley with cows, ducks, chickens, alpacas, donkeys, and an emu.

Since 2014, Morgan and Burton have been co-owners (along with Morgan's friend, actor Paul Rudd) of Samuel's Sweet Shop, a Rhinebeck candy store they saved from being closed after the previous owner, a friend of theirs, died suddenly.

== Filmography ==
=== Film ===
Year	Title	Role	Notes
1991	Uncaged	Sharkey	
1991	To Cross the Rubicon	Rod	
1995	Dillinger and Capone	Jack Bennett	
1995	Undercover Heat	Ramone	
1996	In the Blink of an Eye	Jessie	Television film
1997	Legal Deceit	Todd Hunter	
1999	Road Kill	Bobby	
2003	Something More	Daniel	Short film
2004	Dead & Breakfast	The Sheriff	
2004	Six: The Mark Unleashed	Tom Newman	Direct-to-DVD
2005	Chasing Ghosts	Det. Cole Davies	Direct-to-DVD
2006	Jam	Dale	Television film
2007	Live!	Rick	
2007	Kabluey	Brad	
2007	Fred Claus	Unnamed man getting parking ticket	Cameo
2007	P.S. I Love You	William Gallagher	
2008	The Accidental Husband	Patrick Sullivan	Direct-to-DVD
2008	Days of Wrath	Bryan Gordon	
2009	Watchmen	Edward Blake / Comedian	
2009	Taking Woodstock	Dan	
2010	Shanghai	Connor	
2010	The Losers	Clay	
2011	The Resident	Max	
2011	Peace, Love & Misunderstanding	Jude	
2011	Texas Killing Fields	Brian Heigh	
2011	The Courier	The Courier	Direct-to-VOD, also executive producer
2012	The Possession	Clyde Brenek	
2012	Red Dawn	Sgt. Maj. Andrew Tanner	
2014	The Salvation	Henry Delarue	
2014	They Came Together	Frank	
2015	Solace	Joe Merriwether	
2015	Heist	Luke Vaughn	Direct-to-VOD
2015	Guns for Hire	Bruce	
2015	Desierto	Sam	
2018	Rampage	Harvey Russell	
2020	The Postcard Killings	Jacob Kanon	Also executive producer
2020	Walkaway Joe	Cal McCarthy	
2021	The Unholy	Gerry Fenn	
2022	The Integrity of Joseph Chambers	Police Chief	
2022	Fall	James Conner	
2024	Bloody Axe Wound	Butch Slater	Also producer
2025	Neighborhood Watch	Ed Deerman	

=== Television ===
Year	Title	Role	Notes
1995	Extreme	Jack Hawkins	2 episodes
1995	JAG	Weapons Officer	Episode: "Shadow"
1996	Sliders	Sid	Episode: "El Sid"
1996–1997	The Burning Zone	Dr. Edward Marcase	Main cast; 11 episodes
2000	Walker, Texas Ranger	Jake Hobart	Episode: "Child of Hope"
2001	ER	Firefighter Larkin	Episode: "The Crossing"
2002	The Practice	Daniel Glenn	Episode: The Test"
2002	JAG	CIA Technician Wally	2 episodes
2002	Angel	Sam Ryan	Episode: "Provider"
2002	The Division	Father William Natali	Episode: "Forgive Me, Father"
2003	CSI: Crime Scene Investigation	Undercover Agent #1	Episode: "All for Our Country"
2003	Star Trek: Enterprise	Damron	Episode: "Carpenter Street"
2004	The Handler	Mike	2 episodes
2004	Tru Calling	Geoffrey Pine	Episode: "Two Pair"
2004	Monk	Steven Leight	Episode: "Mr. Monk Takes Manhattan"
2005	The O.C.	Joe Zukowski	Episode: "The Accomplice"
2005	Weeds	Judah Botwin	2 episodes
2005–2008; 2019	Supernatural	John Winchester / Azazel	Recurring; 13 episodes
2006–2009	Grey's Anatomy	Denny Duquette	Recurring (seasons 2–3, 5); 23 episodes
2012–2013	Magic City	Ike Evans	Main role; 16 episodes
2014	Shameless	Charlie Peters	Episode: "Lazarus"
2015	The Secret Life of Marilyn Monroe	Joe DiMaggio	Miniseries; 2 episodes
2015	Texas Rising	"Deaf" Smith	Miniseries; 5 episodes
2015	Extant	James Daniel "JD" Richter	Main role; 13 episodes
2015–2016	The Good Wife	Jason Crouse	Main role (season 7); 19 episodes
2016–2022	The Walking Dead	Negan	Special guest star (season 6), main cast (seasons 7–11); 64 episodes
2017	Robot Chicken	Negan	Voice; Episode: "The Robot Chicken Walking Dead Special: Look Who's Walking"
2017–2019	Ride with Norman Reedus	Himself	2 episodes
2020	Friday Night in with the Morgans	Himself	6 episodes, also executive producer
2021	The Walking Dead: Origins	Himself	Episode: "Negan's Story"
2022	Leopard Skin	LaSalle	Main role; 8 episodes
2023–present	The Walking Dead: Dead City	Negan Smith	Main role; 22 episodes, also executive producer
2024–2026	The Boys	Joe Kessler	Main cast (season 4), guest (season 5); 7 episodes
2025–2026	Invincible	Conquest, Viltrumites	Voice; 6 episodes
2025	Big City Greens	Wolf Fang	Voice; 2 episodes
2025	Destination X	Himself	Host
2026–present	Sterling Point	Joe	7 episodes

=== Video games ===
Year	Title	Role	Notes
2019	Tekken 7	Negan	Downloadable content
