= List of companies based in Kirkland, Washington =

This is a list of large or well-known interstate or international companies headquartered in Kirkland, Washington.

== Currently based in Kirkland ==
- Appen (company) (US headquarters)
- Gates Ventures (formerly bgC3)
- Bluetooth Special Interest Group
- Cascade Investments (Bill Gates private family investment office)
- Echodyne
- EvergreenHealth (Kirkland's top employer in 2010)
- Griptonite Games
- Icom Incorporated (US headquarters)
- Kenworth
- Lancs Industries
- LTC Financial Partners
- RAD Game Tools
- Tableau Software
- Ziply Fiber

== Formerly based in Kirkland ==
- Halo Studios (formerly 343 Industries, moved to Redmond)
- Acumatica (moved to Bellevue)
- Bungie (moved to Bellevue)
- Clearwire (moved to Bellevue)
- Costco (moved to Issaquah)
- Hale's Ales (moved to Ballard in Seattle)
- INRIX (moved to Bellevue)
- iSoftStone (US branch moved to Bellevue)
- Seattle Seahawks (moved to Renton)
- Terabeam (moved to San Jose)
- Valve (moved to Bellevue)
- WaveDivision Holdings (subsidiary of Astound Broadband, moved to Bothell)

=== Defunct ===
- Amaze Entertainment
- Cranky Pants Games
- Donuts (merged under Identity Digital, headquartered in Bellevue)
- Lake Washington Shipyard
- Lamonts
- The Mine (formerly ATG Stores) (acquired by Lowe's)
- Monolith Productions
- Onyx Software (acquired by Consona Corporation)
- Teledesic
- Wall Data

== Branches based in Kirkland ==
- GoDaddy
- Google
  - Campus 1: currently expanding to three 60,000 sq ft (5,600 m^{2}) concrete office buildings over a common parking garage of 170,000 sq ft (16,000 m^{2}), located in the Houghton area of Kirkland)
  - Campus 2: Google has acquired several buildings in the new Kirkland Urban development
- IBM (FileNet)
- Salesforce
