= Craig Caskey =

American baseball player (born 1949)

- Pitcher
- Born: December 11, 1949 (age 76); Visalia, California
- Batted: Right Threw: Right

MLB debut
- July 19, 1973, for the Montreal Expos

Last MLB appearance
- September 30, 1973, for the Montreal Expos

MLB statistics
- Win–loss record: 0–0
- ERA: 5.65
- Strikeouts: 6
- Stats at Baseball Reference

Teams
- Montreal Expos (1973)

Craig Douglas Caskey (born December 11, 1949) is a former Major League Baseball pitcher. Caskey played for the Montreal Expos in 1973.

== Career ==
Caskey attended Lake Washington High School and the University of Puget Sound. He was drafted four times, first by the Houston Astros in the 1969 January Draft. He did not sign. In 1971, the San Francisco Giants selected Caskey in the 10th round of the draft. He again did not sign. In 1972, he was drafted twice, first in the January draft by the California Angels, then in the first round of the June Secondary draft by the Montreal Expos. He signed with Montreal and played for both the West Palm Beach Expos and the Jamestown Falcons in 1972.

He began the 1973 season with the Peninsula Whips of the International League. He was called up to the major leagues in July, and made his debut on July 19. Montreal faced the Cincinnati Reds at Riverfront Stadium. Bill Stoneman, the Expos' starting pitcher in the game pitched only 2.1 innings, and Caskey relieved him. He pitched 4.2 innings, faced 16 hitters, and allowed only one hit and one base on balls. He also recorded a strikeout. The Reds won the game 3–2. Caskey would pitch in nine major league games in 1973, finishing with a 5.65 earned run average, six strikeouts, and four walks in 14 1/3 innings pitched. He also had one at bat, recording a sacrifice bunt, and a run scored.

Caskey pitched for the Memphis Blues in 1974, and would pitch in the Pittsburgh Pirates organization in 1975.
