= Tesla STEM High School =

High school in Redmond, Washington, United States

Location
- 4301 228th Ave N.E. Redmond, WA 98053; 47°38′55″N 122°2′15″W

Information
- Type: High School
- Motto: Inspire, Educate, Innovate
- Established: 2012 (construction completed in 2013)
- Principal: Amie Karkainen
- Faculty: 29.28 (FTE)
- Enrollment: 609 (2022–23)
- Student to teacher ratio: 20.51
- Colors: Blue, White, Green
- Website: tesla.lwsd.org

Tesla STEM High School (officially Nikola Tesla Science, Technology, Engineering & Math High School, formerly STEM High School) is a magnet high school in Redmond, Washington operated by the Lake Washington School District. It serves as a lottery-selected choice program and offers a STEM-based curriculum.

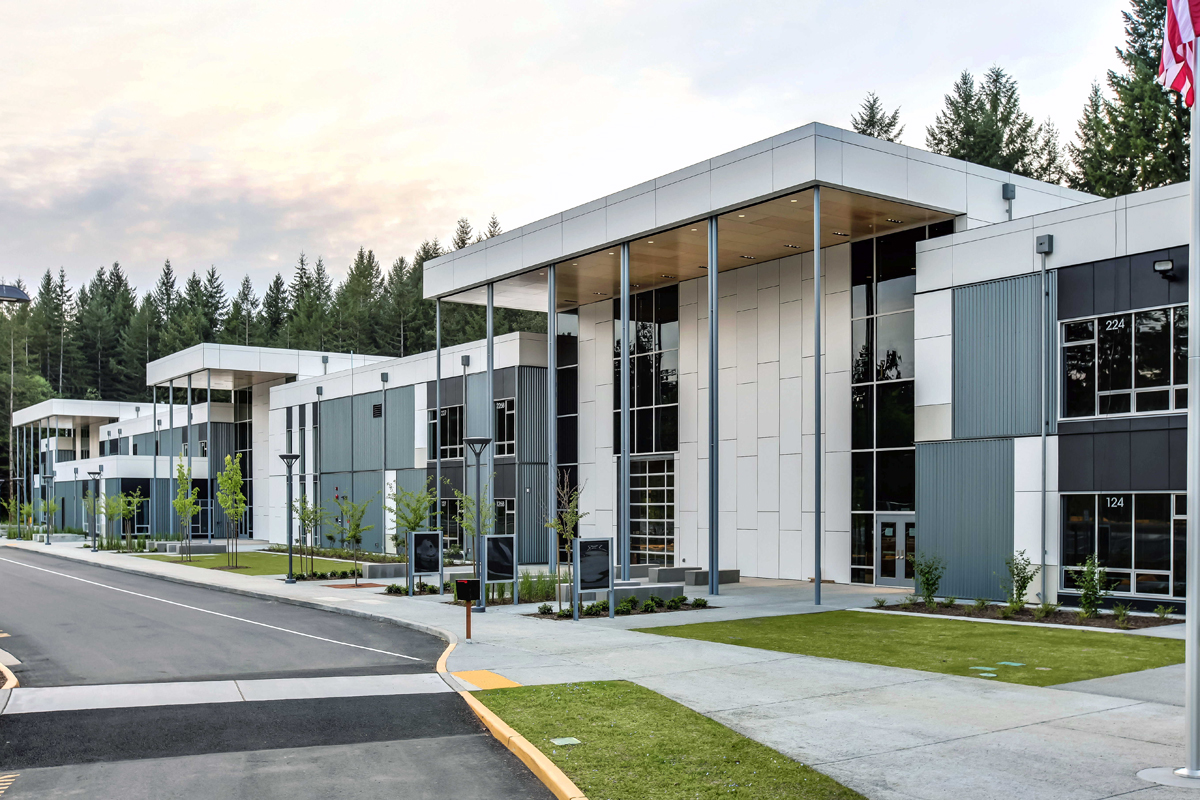
Front of STEM High School

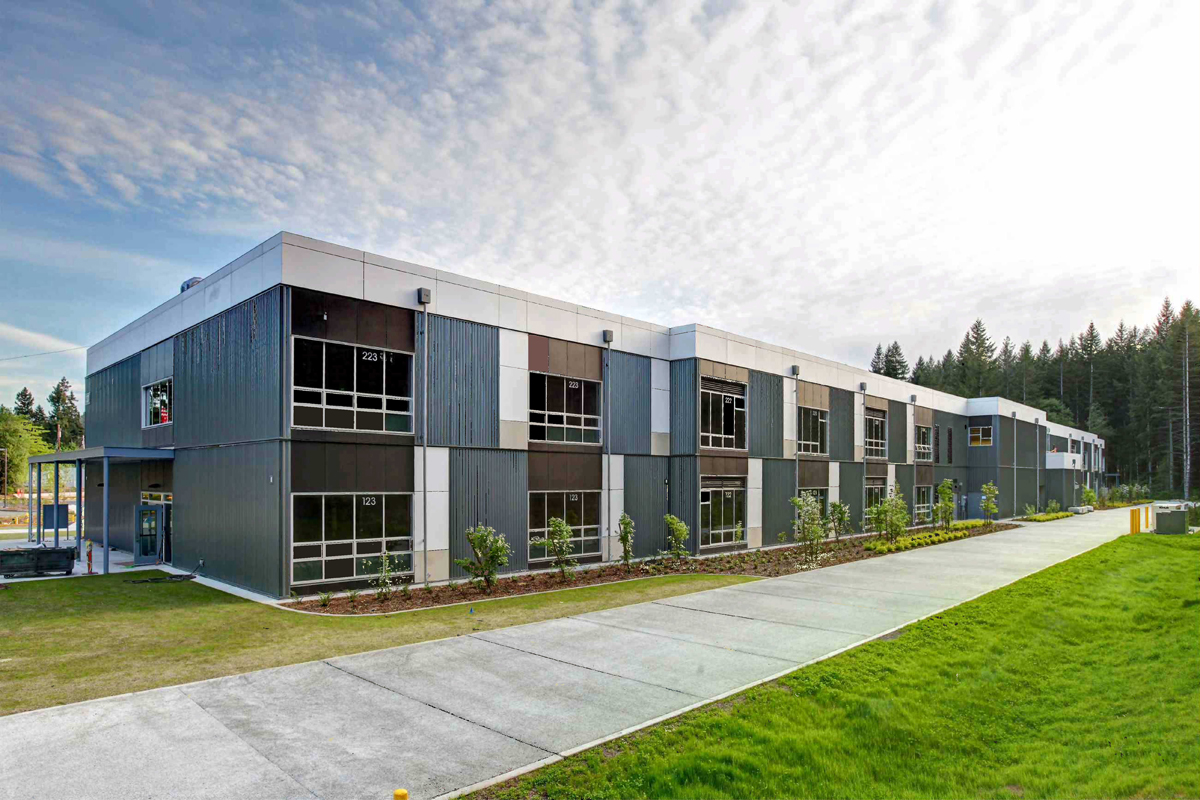
Rear of STEM High School

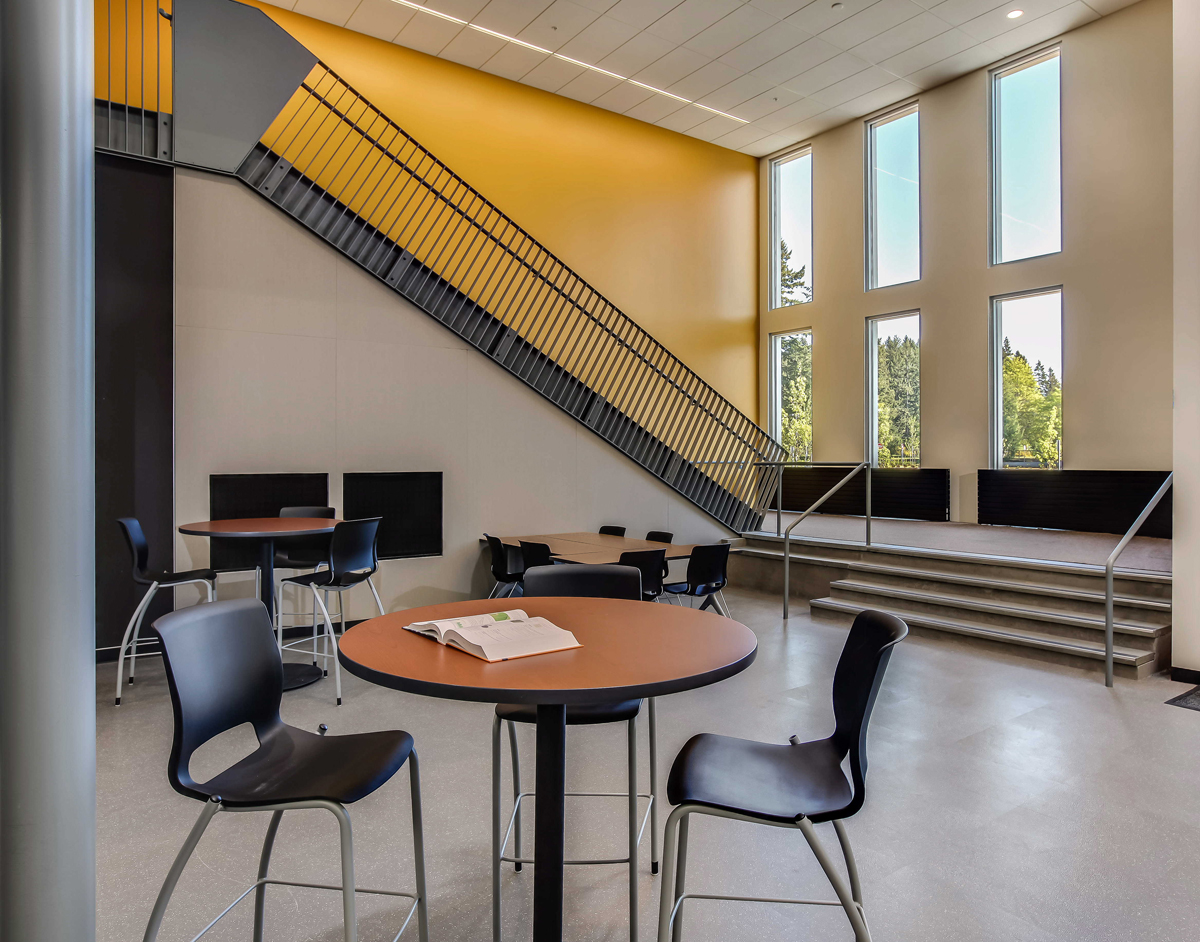
STEM High School interior

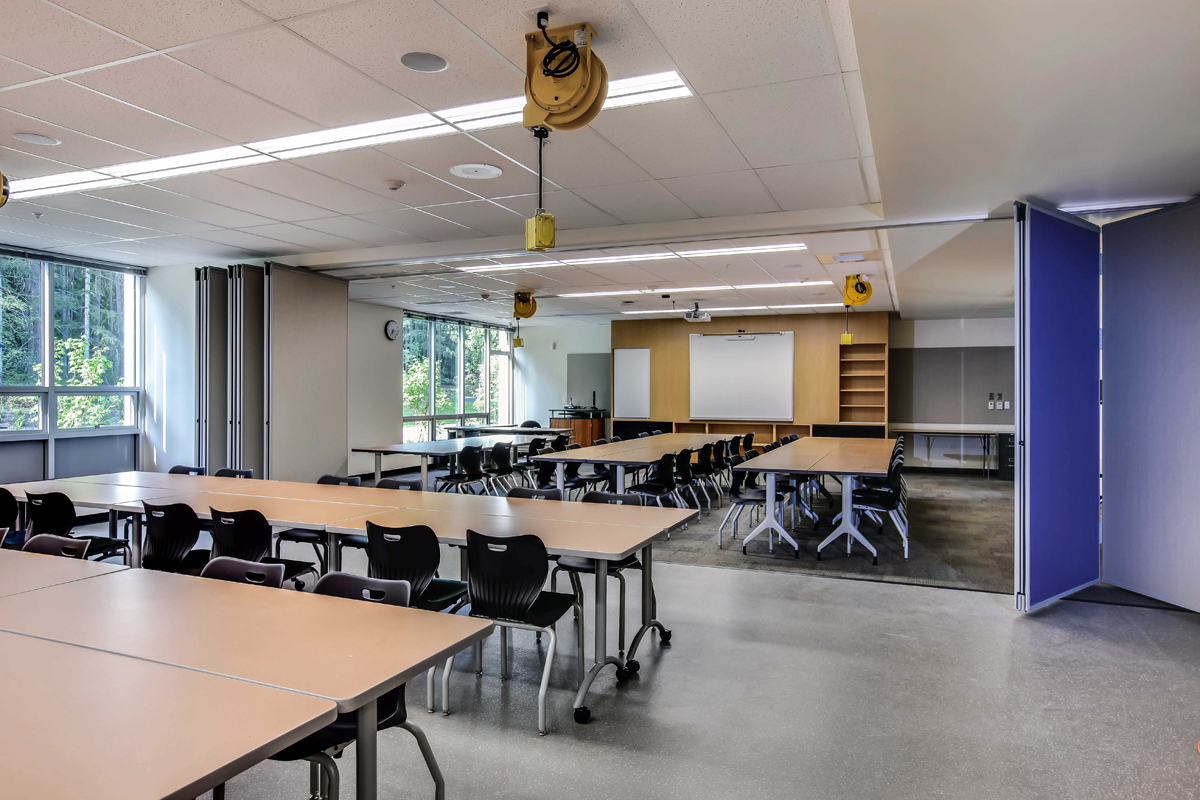
STEM High School classroom

== History and facilities ==
In February 2011, facing substantial sustained and projected future enrollment growth, the Lake Washington School District issued a levy measure to raise $65,400,000 in property taxes from King County residents to fund the construction of expanded facilities at Redmond High School and Eastlake High School as well as the construction of the new STEM High School. The ballot measure passed, and preparations on these population expansion projects began immediately. In December 2011, the Absher Construction Company won the lowest bid for the STEM High School project at $24,080,000 and began construction work in February 2012.

The school's faculty and programs began accepting ninth and tenth grade students in September 2012 for the 2012-2013 school year, but the students were located in the facilities of Eastlake High School until the new dedicated STEM High School was completed in January 2013. The school began admitting eleventh and twelfth grade students in September 2013 and September 2014, respectively.

In 2014, STEM High School formally changed its name to Nikola Tesla Science, Technology, Engineering & Math High School, shortened to Tesla STEM High School.

The two-story school occupies a 21-acre campus. Modular building techniques were used to construct the school due to permitting and time restrictions. The majority of the building was fabricated offsite, with four sections, including the common area, built on site.

Students are admitted from across the district on a lottery basis with around 150 students per grade for a total enrollment of approximately 600 students. In 2025, the school accepted 160 freshman.

=== Awards ===
In 2017, two Tesla STEM students were awarded the President’s Environmental Youth Award from the United States Environmental Protection Agency.

In 2021, students 3D printed thousands of masks for local hospitals.

In 2021 and 2022, Tesla STEM won the Washington Sea Grant's Orca bowl, a marine science competition.

In 2022, U.S. News & World Report ranked Tesla STEM High School first in its annual "Best Washington High Schools" list and twelfth in its "Best U.S. High Schools" list.

In 2023, four students won awards in the Regeneron Pharmaceuticals International Science and Engineering Fair, and in 2024, two students and a teacher were honored with Regeneron Science Talent Search awards. Tesla STEM also won first place in the regional National Science Bowl.

In 2024, the school was rated the third best high school in the nation and in 2026, the 9th best.

== Academics ==
The school's course offerings and overall academic approach are focused on emphasizing the four STEM fields: science, technology, engineering, and mathematics. Students are required to take courses in science and math, as well as engineering and technology via indirect integration in other courses, through twelfth grade. Key tenets of the school's curriculum include leveraging problem-based learning, a professional learning community, integrated curricula, scientific inquiry, and constructivist learning.

In principle, the school's curriculum is designed such that ninth and tenth grade focus on foundation: building skills such as understanding and applying the engineering design process, collaboratively working in a Problem-Based Learning (PBL) environment, as well as other critical thinking aspects. Eleventh and twelfth grade students focus on application: selecting a concentration of study and conducting independent research.

In the 2014-2015 academic year, the school began four “Signature Programs," open to students from all comprehensive high schools in the Lake Washington School District: Eastlake High School, Juanita High School, Lake Washington High School, and Redmond High School. Eleventh graders are given the choice between selecting two signature labs: Environmental Engineering and Sustainable Design, or AP Psychology and Forensics. Twelfth graders may either take the Advanced Physics Lab (AP Physics C: Electricity and Magnetism and AP Physics C: Mechanics) or Biomedical Engineering alongside Anatomy and Physiology.

In 2023, the school had 100% participation in AP coursework.

== Athletics and clubs ==
Athletics and sports programs are not offered at the school. Students who wish to participate in such programs must do so at one of the four aforementioned comprehensive high schools whose boundaries within which they reside.

The school has nearly 40 clubs. The TED-Ed club hosted TEDx independent events from 2016-2019.

== Courses and pathways ==
A total of 13 AP courses are offered, including AP Computer Science Principles (9), AP Biology (10, optional), AP Environmental Science (10), AP Language and Composition (11), AP Psychology (11, elective), AP Physics C: Electricity and Magnetism and AP Physics C: Mechanics (12, optional senior lab), AP Calculus AB (varies, 11th most common), AP Calculus BC (varies and optional, 12th most common), AP Computer Science A (elective), AP Chemistry (elective), and AP Statistics (elective).

Typical learning pathways at Tesla STEM include the computer science pathway (AP CS Principles (9), AP CSA (10), Data Structures (11), Advanced Projects in Java (12)), the engineering pathway (Engineering 1, Engineering 2, Engineering 3), and the life sciences pathway (AP Biology (10), AP Psychology (11), Biomedical Engineering and Anatomy/Physiology (12)).

Four signature labs are offered at STEM, with students being given the option to choose two of them. In 11th grade, students have the choice between Environmental Engineering / Sustainable Design and AP Psychology / Forensics, whereas in 12th grade students choose between the Advanced Physics Lab and Biomedical Engineering / Anatomy and Physiology.

The school is partnered with nearby businesses to offer junior-year internships.
