= Juanita High School =

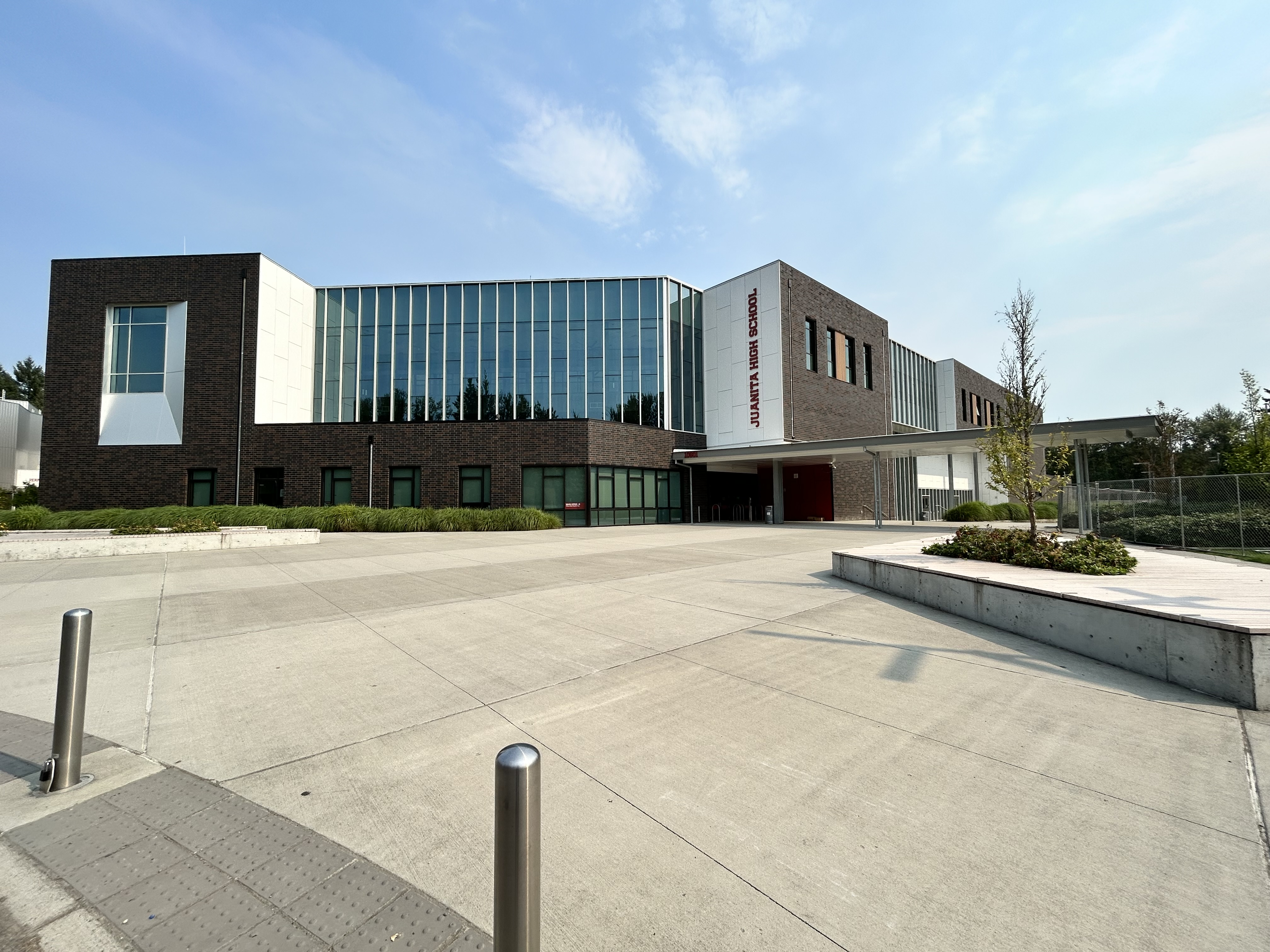

Location
- 10601 Northeast 132nd Street; Kirkland, Washington 98034; 47.7157259°N 122.1995564°W

Information
- Type: Public
- Established: September 4, 1971
- Principal: Ella Maeda
- Teaching staff: 89.86 (FTE)
- Enrollment: 1,778 (2024–2025)
- Student to teacher ratio: 19.79
- Colors: Navy Blue, Red, and White
- Mascot: Ravens
- Rival: Lake Washington High School, Bellevue High School, and Inglemoor High School
- Website: jhs.lwsd.org

Juanita High School (JHS) is a high school in Kirkland, King County, Washington, in the Pacific Northwest region of the Western United States. It is administered by Lake Washington School District (LWSD).

== History and facilities ==
Juanita was opened on September 4, 1971, as a result of a campaign driven by a proposed education theory known as the "Juanita Concept", developed by John Strauss, who became the high school's first principal. The school and the school district however was unable to maintain the concept for long, primarily because of the passing of the "Basic Education Law" in the mid-1970s, resulting in the school later remodeling its curriculum into a traditional format. The mascot chosen back in the early 1970s was the "rebel", to represent the rebellious nature of the then new teaching concept and the upcoming Bicentennial.

Juanita was the second high school on the West Coast of the United States to be accepted as a designated "Cambridge International Center" by the University of Cambridge International Examinations program of the famous ancient University of Cambridge in Cambridge, in England / Great Britain, of the United Kingdom. Approved schools offer a Cambridge Advanced International Certificate of Education study program for academic high achievers allowing them to take the Cambridge AICE exams, the equivalent of the A-level exams in Britain / United Kingdom. Juanita High began administering the program in 2010.

=== Facilities ===
The Juanita school campus consists mainly of two buildings, the school academic building and the field house building for athletics. The school building has the classrooms, lunchroom / cafeteria, theater / auditorium, library, and administrative / departmental offices. The field house building has the field house, swimming pool, and weight-lifting / exercise rooms.

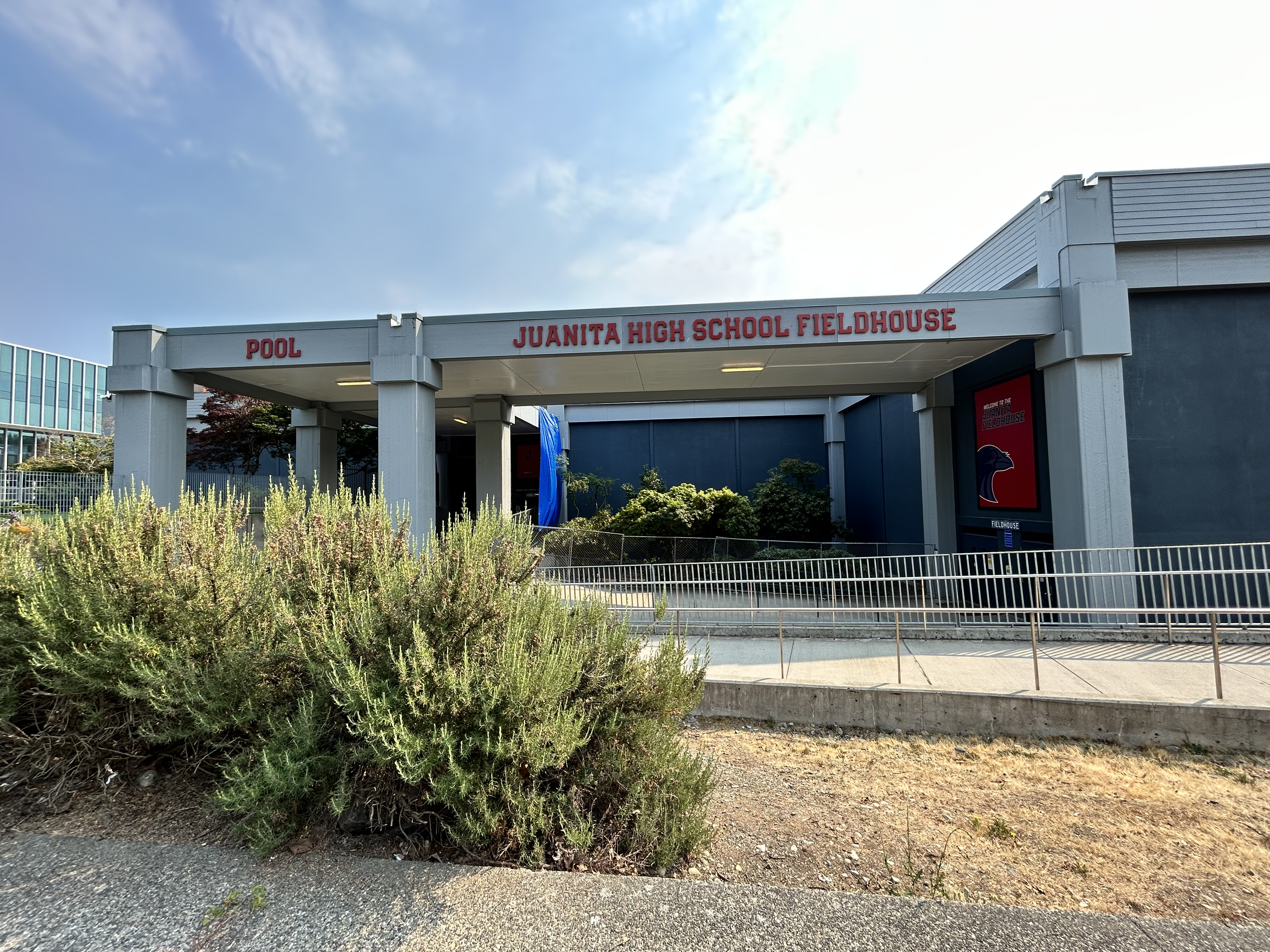
Entrance to Kirkland, Washington's Juanita High School's Field House /swimming pool / exercise rooms

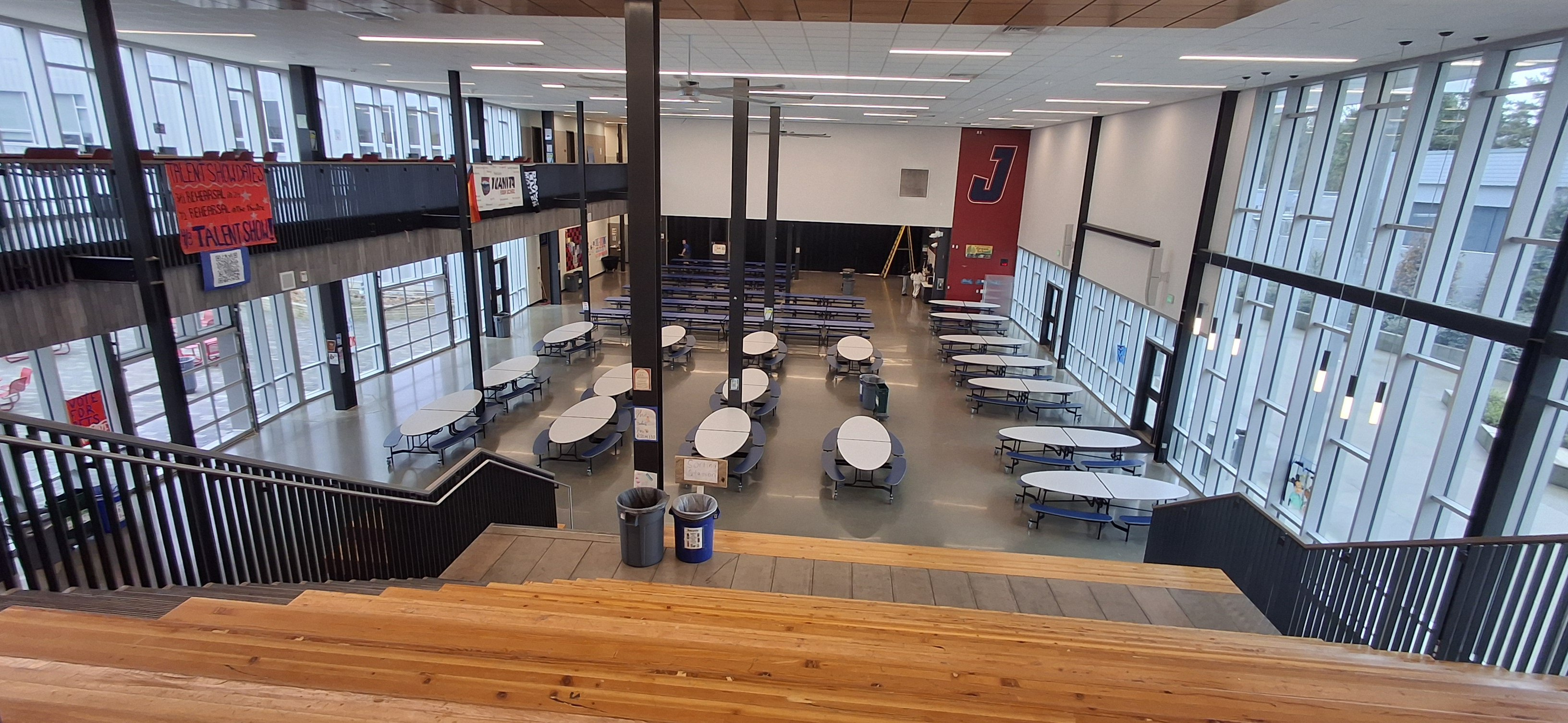
The main cafeteria of Juanita High School. Photo taken from second floor balcony

==== New building ====
In 2016, the LWSD made a levy request for a $398 million construction bond measure to demolish and rebuild two elementary schools, a middle school, and the 1970–1971 Juanita High School structure. The schools needed more room and modernizing for additional students.

The proposed bond issue originally included a plan to tear down the school's swimming pool, which is shared with the WAVE Aquatics water polo program and Inglemoor, Woodinville, Bothell, North Creek, and Lake Washington high schools. Through a $1.8 million grant from the government of King County's Parks Department, the swimming pool was incorporated into an updated bond issue.

Construction on the project broke ground in June 2017. By a year later in June 2018, half the former school was demolished and rebuilt. The whole school was rebuilt and fully refurbished by 2 1/2 years later in September 2020.

=== Mascot change ===
During the 1980s, the school's logo was altered, containing features of the old 1863 Confederate battle flag of the former Army of Northern Virginia of the old Confederate States Army, from the era of the American Civil War of 1861–1865, along with depicting the "Running Rebel" as a Confederate Army soldier. Pictures from old yearbooks showed students on campus with old Confederate flags displayed. In 2017, a student started a petition to change the mascot, citing the mascot's controversial historical ties to the old southern Confederacy as racist. The students voted in a referendum at the time of 2017 to keep the mascot.

Three years later, in 2020, Juanita High alumni and additional current students resurrected the controversy and renewed petition, and the LWSD superintendent unilaterally removed the "Rebel" mascot and logo / symbols before the start in September of the 2020–2021 school year began. Students later voted for the new Juanita mascot to become the "Raven".

=== Juanita Public Pathway ===
In April 2024 students and nearby Kirkland residents proposed a 5-mile walking trail to connect the school to surrounding neighborhoods and the Burke–Gilman Trail called the Juanita Public Pathway. The school has a 2-mile enforced walking radius and the district encourages students to walk. Students advocating for the trail say it is healthier to travel by walking, but noted it is not safe. The proposal was presented to the Kirkland City Council. The council did not take any action on the proposal at that time, but said they were evaluating options.

==== Deaths of pedestrian students ====
Two students had been killed walking to and from the school: one in 1999, Christopher Bo-Yin Lin, and another in 2000, Todd Evans. Evans was a sophomore in the school's band, a performing artist, and a twin. He was struck by a car while walking to the high school on October 9, 2000, at 6:45 am in a crosswalk on Juanita-Woodinville Way NE. His walk from his Bothell home was more than a mile long and the road he was crossing has a speed limit of 40 mph. King County performed a study after the death of Lin that concluded the speed limit was appropriate, which is reduced to 20 mph when children are present. The Manual on Uniform Traffic Control Devices does not define what that means and drivers believe it means during school hours. A pedestrian safety public rally was held at the scene of the accident. Dynamic speed feedback signs were installed later that studies indicated created safer conditions.

== Academics ==
In 2010 Juanita began admitting lower ninth grade students, in addition to the school's previous student body of grades ten through twelve due to overcrowding in the district.

In 2014 Juanita won its fourth Washington Achievement Award Special Recognition for its extended graduation rate.

In 2017 six Juanita students were awarded "Top in the Country" honors in the Cambridge Assessment. In 2018 and 2019, seven and two students were earned the same title in 2018 and 2019, respectively.

From 2020 to 2022 the National Parent Teacher Association designated Juanita High School as a school of excellence.

In 2021 Juanita student Caroline Yim was honored by the International Thespian Society with a $35,000 Grace Kelly Scholarship for scenic design in the play The Hound of the Baskervilles.

In 2021 a Juanita junior, Ria Mohan, and member of Future Health Professionals (HOSA) won first place honors in the state and international HOSA Leadership Conferences. Her research, How Can the Menstrual Health of Women & Teens in Homeless Shelters be Improved?, was done in partnership with a Seattle nonprofit that hosts menstrual product donation drives for homeless women. Mohan and another Juanita student, Pragnya Gudipati, won the 2021 T-Mobile Changemaker Challenge, a grant for $5,000, to develop a diagnostic tool to check for Tuberculosis (TB) with an at-home urinalysis stick called "Tuberculosticks."

=== Biotechnology program ===
In 1996 biology teacher Jeanne Chowning started western Washington's first biotechnology course at Juanita. The course was developed in a science education partnership with the Fred Hutchinson Cancer Center (FHCC) that provides students with workshops and summer internships at the HutchLab, Amgen, ZymoGenetics, Seattle Biomedical Research Institute, and the University of Washington's (UW) department of Genome Sciences and the Molecular and Cellular Biology graduate program. Chowning worked with biology teacher Mary Glodowski, who taught the course at Juanita, to develop the curriculum.

In 2001 Chowning, Glodowski, and other Juanita science teachers started the first annual Student Biotechnology Expo hosted by the Washington Biotechnology Foundation. In 2002, the Expo won the Golden Apple Award. PBS highlighted Chowning, Glodowski, and one of her students, Matt Winkler, in the publication of the award.

In 2003 Glodowski won the Amgen Award for Science Teaching Excellence, and in 2007, Glodowski won the Presidential Award for Excellence in Mathematics and Science Teaching, primarily for her work on Juanita's biotechnology program. Glodowski also won a National Association of Biology Teachers award for Outstanding Biology Teacher of the Year.

Between 2002 and 2004 some students in Juanita's biotechnology program worked with genome research scientists at UW on the Human Genome Project, and isolated a segment of the sequenced DNA as part of UW's High School Human Genome Project. Students in the class also studied the migratory patterns of coyotes, by sequencing DNA, and learned to genetically alter bacteria, which is the same technique used in the production of insulin. The work contributed to research and curriculum.

In 2006, Juanita won the first ever Judges' Award of Excellence cup at the Biotechnology Expo, hosted by the Northwest Association for Biomedical Research.

In 2014 LWSD opened a Capstone course in partnership with EvergreenHealth at Juanita in the field of global health. The STEM Signature Program, adopted from Tesla STEM High School's curriculum, requires the biotechnology class in a series with English and anatomy/physiology. The capstone project involves the diagnosis of a possible case of Tuberculosis. The program also offered opportunities to shadow healthcare workers.

Juanita continues to partner with FHCC in its biotechnology program through the Fred Hutch High School Pathways Explorers Program and the Fred Hutchinson Summer High School Internship.

== Sports and extra-curricular activities ==
In 2012 and 2013 a Juanita student, Frank Garber, won the boys golf state championships.

In 2015 the Juanita High School softball team won the KingCo Athletic Conference Washington state championship.

=== Football program ===
In 1980 Chuck Tarbox joined Juanita as a football coach, and in his first year, he led the team to their first win in more than four years. Their longest winning streak was 26 games. Under his coaching in 1984–1985, Juanita won back-to-back state championships. He coached football for more than 40 years and won more than 200 games. Bodybuilder Mike O'Hearn played for Juanita under Tarbox during his junior year, who Tarbox said was "NFL quality." He retired from Juanita in 1990, and in 1991, he was inducted into the Washington State Football Coaches Hall of Fame. Juanita held a memorial for him after his death in 2014.

In 2015 and 2016 Juanita football running back Salvon Ahmed won Kingco Athletic Conference's offensive player of the year and named for the all conference games. His senior year, 2016, he played in the All-American Bowl. He went on to play for the Washington Huskies, where he earned several Pac-10 academic honors, and the Miami Dolphins. He visited the school to inspire student athletes in 2021.

==== 2014 attempted rape and hazing culture ====
On February 7, 2015, five Juanita football players were charged with the attempted rape of their 18-year-old volunteer manager, a Juanita student with special needs. The freshman student athletes lured the victim into the locker room and recorded the assault with a cell phone as the victim was held down on the shower floor. Senior students intervened and stopped the assault from progressing and immediately reported it to the assistant coach, Lele Te’o. The incident, a hazing ritual called "jubie", was classified as a culture problem because the perpetrators had been victimized themselves. The principal, Gary Moed, revised locker room procedures to require an adult supervisor or school security officer to be in the locker room when it is unlocked. Two administrators were placed on leave, but cleared in a LWSD investigation and allowed to return to work.

In October 2015 the Kirkland Police Department (KPD) released documents from the investigation that revealed Moed, the athletic director Steve Juzeler, and the football coach, Shaun Tarantola, discouraged police involvement. They also neglected to notify LWSD Risk and Safety Management. Juzeler initially lied to police about his knowledge of the crime, later saying he didn't think it was serious enough to warrant police involvement. The documents also showed that Juanita officials were aware of similar crimes in the past involving the football team, including during summer football camp at Camp Casey on Whidbey Island. Tarantola resigned and became an assistant coach at a Texas high school. The students were expelled and sentenced to 12 months of probation with community service. Moed and Juzeler were not investigated and LWSD defended their actions.

=== Clubs ===
Juanita students founded its DECA club in 2012. In 2014, two members placed in the top ten students at the international competition hosted in Washington, D.C.

In 2014 students, with Greg Shelton as their advisor, founded Juanita's Technology Student Association club.

In 2015 freshman Veronique Harris founded the Eastside's first American Civil Liberties Union (ACLU) of Washington club. Harris was awarded with the ACLU's Youth Activist Award the following year.

=== Student activism ===
In 2016 more than 200 students walked out in protest of the 2016 United States presidential election after Donald Trump was elected.

In 2018 students organized a walk-out to bring attention to gun control and school safety after the Parkland high school shooting.

== Notable alumni ==
- Cooper McLeod, US Speedskating team, competing in the 2026 Winter Olympics
- Salvon Ahmed, NFL running back for the Chicago Bears
- Micah Downs, professional basketball player
- Jill Kintner, cyclist, 2008 Summer Olympics bronze medalist
- Mike O’Hearn, American actor and bodybuilder
- Cher Scarlett, American software engineer and workers' rights activist
- Bryan Walters, American football player
