= Emerson High School (Kirkland, Washington) =

Location
- 10903 NE 53rd Street; Kirkland, Washington; United States; 47°39′20″N 122°11′46″W

Information
- Type: Public
- Established: 1967
- School district: Lake Washington School District
- Principal: Nell Ballard Jones
- Teaching staff: 10.00 (on FTE basis)
- Grades: 9 to 12
- Enrollment: 61 (2025-2026)
- Student to teacher ratio: 5.90
- Color: Rainbow
- Mascot: Dragon
- Website: emhs.lwsd.org

Emerson High School is an alternative high school in the Houghton neighborhood of Kirkland, Washington, operated by the Lake Washington School District. It is called a 'choice' school because enrollment is purely by choice. It maintains a maximum of 190 students to maintain a low student–teacher ratio. The school was renamed from BEST Senior high school in the early 2010s.

== Description ==
The school's former name, BEST, is an acronym for Better Education for Students and Teachers. The school serves students who do not function well in a more conventional school environment. Reasons for enrolling most often revolve around difficulties at another, more traditional high school. These reasons can include discipline issues, addiction, teen pregnancy, learning disabilities/differences, difficulty adjusting socially etc. With a very low student–teacher ratio students are able to get much more one-on-one time.

== History ==
B.E.S.T. High School began in 1967 at the old Collins School site.

In 1999, B.E.S.T. High School moved to its current location after the district opened its new Administrative Resource Center in Redmond Town Center.

On October 8, 2003, BEST was the only school in Washington State to be visited by the USDA's "BAC" Mobile on its nationwide tour with physicians who facilitate all-day workshops and activities to promote food safety.

In 2003, the BEST H.S. science department was recognized with the NSTA / Toyota TAPESTRY Award for Innovation in Science Literacy Education for its all-school “Senate Science Hearing."

In 2006, King County (WA) recognized the BEST H.S. science department with the "Earth Heroes at School" award for a school-wide environmental education project.

In September 2008, the BEST H.S. has been joined by another school, The Family Learning Center. A former principal, Jane Andrews, cited budget issues and administrative efficiency as the reasons for the merge. Eventually the two schools changed their names to Emerson High School ( formerly BEST) and Emerson K-12 ( formerly family learning center)

In 2009, AMGEN recognized the BEST H.S. science department, which collaborated with Shoreline Community College and the Seattle Biomedical Research Institute, with the "AMGEN Award for Science Teaching Excellence" (AASTE.)

On March 26th 2026 a groundbreaking occurred for a brand new school to be made on the campus. It is projected to open up for the 2027-28 school year and it will have Emerson high school and Emerson K-12 be the schools within the building.

== Rock School ==
Emerson is the site of Rock School, a non-profit organization offering training programs for aspiring rock musicians, ages 12 to 21.
