= International Community School (Washington) =

Location
- 11133 NE 65th ST, Kirkland, WA, 98033; United States; 47°39′50″N 122°11′28″W

Information
- Type: Public Choice School
- Motto: Forever We Rise
- Established: 1997
- School district: Lake Washington School District
- Principal: Jacob Hendrickson
- Faculty: 22.44 (FTE)
- Grades: 6 -12
- Enrollment: 406 (2022–2023)
- Student to teacher ratio: 18.09
- Colors: Red, Gold, Black
- Mascot: Phoenix
- Website: ics.lwsd.org

International Community School (ICS) is a small 6-12th grade public school in the Lake Washington School District of Washington State. It is part of a series of schools founded by Dr. Bruce Saari. "International" in the school's name reflects an international focus in curriculum, and it is not an international school in the usual sense.

The mascot for ICS is the Phoenix, and the motto is "Forever We Rise".

== Rankings ==
The International Community School has been recognized as one of the best high schools in the United States, public or private. In every year since it was founded, ICS students have achieved top-tier scores on national and state achievement tests like Washington Assessment of Student Learning (WASL) test, the High School Proficiency Exam (HSPE), and Smarter Balanced Assessment Consortium (SBAC). 100% of students participate in AP classes with essentially all students receiving passing grades. As a result, ICS has been ranked among the top high schools in the United States in multiple rankings. From 2007 to 2014 it was selected as a Gold Medal School, ranking between 10th-30th out of the top 100 schools in US News' Best High School list. In 2014, the International Community School was ranked 13th in the nation by U.S. News & World Report. From 2008 to 2014, Newsweek selected ICS as one of the Public Elites, one of the best high schools in the U.S. In the 2012 OECD PISA evaluation, ICS was ranked as the number 1 school in Math, number 4 in reading, and number 7 in Science of all U.S. high schools participating in the evaluation. In 2005, it was selected as a No Child Left Behind—Blue Ribbon School of Excellence. In 2019, U.S. News & World Report ranked ICS as 76th among all high schools in the United States.

== Location ==
The school is located in Kirkland, Washington, a suburb of Seattle, Washington, and serves students from the Lake Washington School District.

== History ==
=== Founding ===
The school was proposed to the Lake Washington School District by parents in 1997 and its program and policies were developed by Dr. Bruce Saari who modeled it after the Bellevue International School, where he had been program developer the previous six years. Up until July 2011, Cindy Duenas was the principal of ICS. After the 2010-2011 school year, Duenas left to help start the new STEM (Science, Technology, Engineering and Math) school for the Lake Washington School District. She was replaced by Dr. Matthew Livingston in 2011. He was replaced in 2014 by Dr. Gregory Moncada. Moncada was replaced in 2017 by Margaret Kinney. In 2014, Andrya Packer, one of the school's humanities teachers, was selected to complete a Fulbright Scholarship in Scotland.

=== Expansion to modern facilities ===
The entrance to ICS' old building

Beginning in 2011, plans for the construction of a new 63,925 square foot building to replace the former building were created by the school's faculty and the school district. Construction of the adjacent new building began in June 2012 and finished in August 2013, prior to the start of the 2013-2014 school year. The old building was destroyed and replaced by the current soccer field and parking lot. The new facility sits on 11.2 acres of land and cost $18 million to build.

In September 2013, students entered the school with modern classrooms and laboratories. The new school includes a centralized commons nicknamed "The Lyceum" for school assemblies, theatrical performances and for use as a cafeteria. Later in the new building's first school year, bleachers were installed in the commons for better seating for the upperclassmen.

== Admissions and enrollment ==
=== Prior to 2012 ===
Because of the limited enrollment, before 2012 students were chosen from applicants from Lake Washington School District's 7th grade class by lottery, and there were limited opportunities for transfer into higher grades after being put on a waitlist. After the school district moved from a K-6 elementary school system to a standard K-5 elementary school in Fall 2012, which changed the admissions of ICS to be in 6th grade. The school has a grandfather clause allowing for students who are members of founding families or who had sibling in the first class of the school to be admitted without going through the lottery system.

=== Introduction of 6th graders ===
Beginning from the 2013-2014 school year and coinciding with the larger change among the school district, 6th graders were given admission to ICS. The application process and lottery were moved upward for 5th graders, and the waitlist process remained the same. There are currently only about 30 of the original students from the first 6th grade class left (there were originally over 60). They were the first ones to go to a 6th grade day camp. The same year ICS introduced a 6th grade class, a time capsule was made and was set to be opened 100 years later.

=== Demographics ===
As of 2020-21, ICS had an enrollment of 429 students, with minorities consisting of 47% of the total student body. The total demographic of the school can be broken down into the following:

- 36% Caucasian
- 54% Asian
- 3% Hispanic
- 0% Pacific-Islander
- 6% Two or More Races

The ratio of male students to female students is 48:52.

== Academics ==
The school has a student-teacher ratio of 18.76, with 19 full-time teachers, and has a 98% graduation rate.

== Student life ==
=== Sports ===
ICS is not part of the KingCo high school division for sports and does not have any sports teams. Since ICS accepts any student in the Lake Washington School District, it is prohibited from sports competition. Should students choose participate in sports, they can do so at their "home school" (the Lake Washington School District neighborhood high school that corresponds with their home address.)

== Notable alumni ==
- Osman Salahuddin, Washington State House Representative 48th Legislature District, former Redmond City councilmember
