= Deb Caletti =

American writer

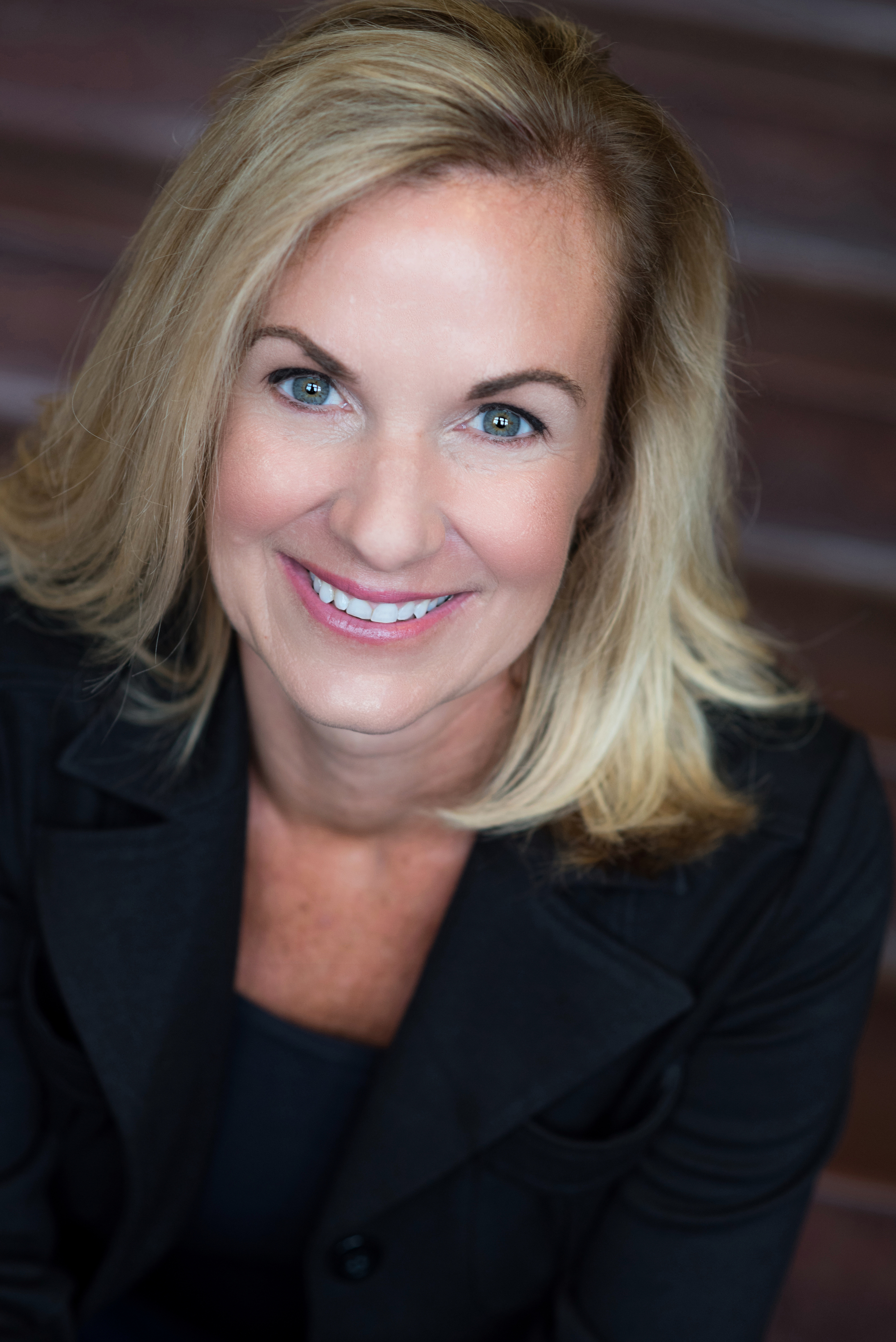
- Born: Debora Lynn Caletti; June 16, 1963 (age 63); San Rafael, California, U.S.
- Education: Lake Washington High School; University of Washington (BA)
- Occupation: Novelist
- Writing career
- Genres: Young adult fiction, fiction
- Website: www.debcaletti.com

Deb Caletti (born June 16, 1963) is an American writer of young adult and adult fiction. Caletti is a National Book Award finalist, and a Michael L. Printz Honor Book medalist, as well as the recipient of other numerous awards including the PEN USA finalist award, the Josette Frank Award for Fiction, the Washington State Book Award, and SLJ Best Book award. Caletti's books feature the Pacific Northwest, and her young adult work is popular for tackling difficult issues typically reserved for adult fiction. Her first adult fiction novel, He's Gone, was published by Random House in 2013, and was followed by several other books for adults, in addition to her many books for teens.

== Personal life ==
Deb Caletti was born June 16, 1963, in Fairfax, California. When Caletti was eleven, her father's work relocated the family to Seattle, Washington. Caletti often cites her love for writing and reading stemming back to her early childhood. "My most memorable teacher was Rich Campe, my third-grade teacher at Fairlands Elementary in Pleasanton, California. Rich was a bona fide Bay Area hippie…We also did a lot of creative writing in his class. His remarks on my stories…were the sort of encouragement that could make you feel that maybe, possibly, you were on to something with the whole writing thing. Groovy! he'd scrawl at the top of the page. Far OUT! If anyone knows where Rich Campe is, please let me know so that I can heartily and sincerely thank him." Caletti attended Lake Washington High School in Kirkland, Washington, graduating in 1981. She earned a BA in Journalism from the University of Washington in Seattle in 1985. Caletti was a longtime resident of Issaquah, Washington, where she set many of her books as the fictional town of "Nine Mile Falls." She currently resides in Seattle, Washington with her family.

== Career ==
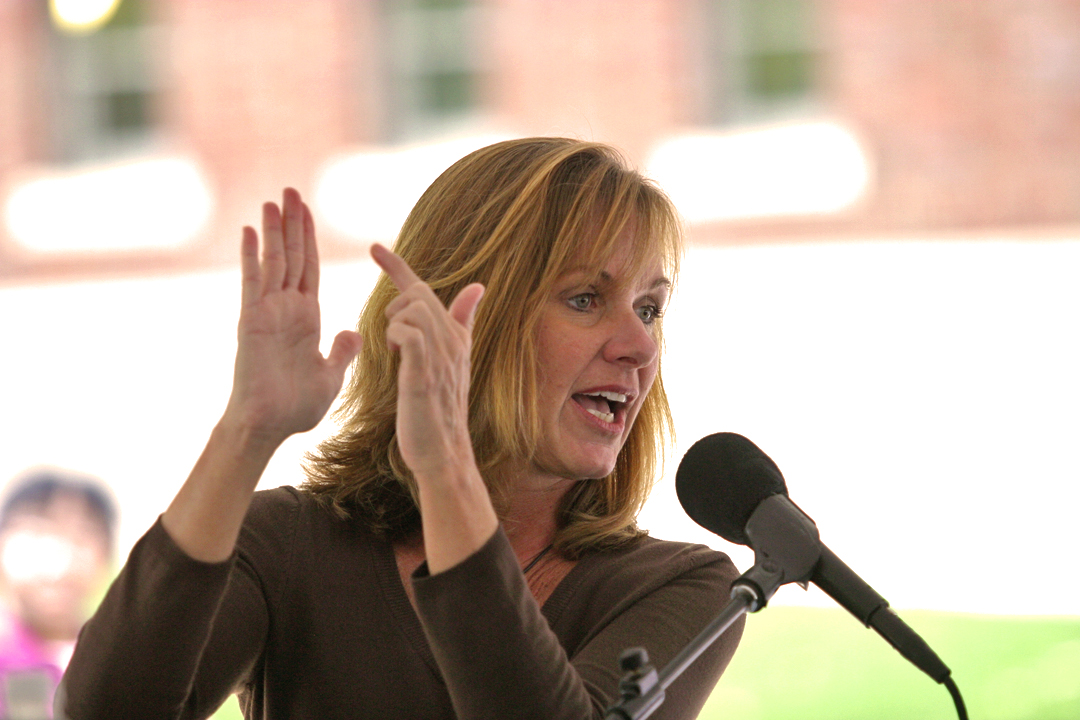
Caletti at a 2010 Bookfest event in Ann Arbor, Michigan

A passionate reader and writer from an early age, Caletti only started focusing seriously on her writing after her youngest child turned two. Though she had studied journalism at the University of Washington, receiving some recognition for playwriting, Caletti feared that a career in creative writing would be too difficult. However, Caletti says, "When my son was two, I got serious about writing. I didn’t want to be one of those people who talked about their dream but never did anything about it. That seemed sad. I worried I would end up at the counter at Denny’s eating pie and smoking cigarettes, and I’ve never even smoked. So I made a decision that I would do it until it happened. No giving up, no going back."

After writing for some time, Caletti’s fifth book, The Queen of Everything was picked up by Simon and Schuster in 2002. Written originally for adults, Queen was published in the young adult market, and received positive reviews, including a starred review in Publishers Weekly (Nov. 2012) and named to the Children's Book Committee (CBC) of Bank Street College of Education's Best Children's Book of the Year list (2003). Her next novel, Honey, Baby, Sweetheart (2004) was a National Book Award finalist, California Young Reader medal finalist (2005/2006), PNBA Best Book of 2005 award, and made many of the year’s top lists including New York Public Library’s 2005 "Books for the Teen Age".

Based on a van Gogh painting, Caletti’s next novel Wild Roses was published in 2005, and was a 2006 finalist for the Washington State Book Award. Following the success of her first three novels in three years, Caletti then went on to write The Nature of Jade (2007), The Fortunes of Indigo Skye (2008), The Secret Life of Prince Charming (2009), The Six Rules of Maybe (2010), Stay (2011), and The Story of Us in 2012. Caletti’s next venture was a much-anticipated adult fiction novel titled He’s Gone, released by Random House in 2013. After that came further books for adults and young adults: The Last Forever (2014); The Secrets She Keeps (2015); Essential Maps for the Lost (2016); What's Become of Her (2017).

Her YA novel A Heart in a Body in the World was released in September 2018, and received numerous honors including a Michael L. Printz Honor Book. In additional, it won the Josette Frank Award for Fiction from the CBC and named to its Best Children's Book of the Year list with Outstanding Merit. This title as well as many others has been translated into many languages, including Polish, French, and Russian. The first title of hers to be translated into German (in 2022), it was nominated in March 2023 by the youth jury in a category of the Deutscher Jugendliteraturpreis which will be awarded in October.

A series of television films based on Caletti's novels was in production in 2007, though that project is now on hold. Caletti was also a judge for the 2013 National Book Awards, in the Young People's Literature category.

=== Themes ===
Caletti’s complex stories center around healthy and unhealthy relationship dynamics, family (including stepfamilies), change and resilience, and the connections between human nature and animal nature. "Self discovery, finding home, dealing with being a mostly good hearted but flawed person in a complicated world, those are all repeating themes in my work… Writing is always my therapy – the attempt to work out particular events and questions I’m trying to understand."

All of Caletti's books are set in the Pacific Northwest, and she "thinks of setting as if it were a character, with its own quirks, temperaments and moods." Characters and locations reappear in her books; main characters in one book may be briefly glimpsed in another. Caletti "loves this idea of interconnectedness… the thought that you might have once passed on the street the person you are now married to."

Caletti has often been asked about her use of profanity or sexual scenes in young adult novels. Addressing this, she says, "My primary job is to create a realistic world with realistic characters. Some people swear. Some people don’t. Some do on occasion. So that is the reality in my books, too." Caletti describes this further, "Honesty is the most important thing to me in my work... It is not my aim to show an idealized world. It is my aim to show the world as it is in all of its beauty and messiness and variety and wackiness and rare moments of perfection."

== Books ==
- The Queen of Everything (Simon & Schuster 2002)
- Honey, Baby, Sweetheart (Simon & Schuster 2004)
- Wild Roses (Simon & Schuster 2005)
- The Nature of Jade (Simon & Schuster 2007)
- The Fortunes of Indigo Skye (Simon & Schuster 2008)
- The Secret Life of Prince Charming (Simon & Schuster 2009)
- The Six Rules of Maybe (Simon & Schuster 2010)
- Stay (Simon & Schuster 2011)
- The Story of Us (Simon & Schuster 2012)
- He's Gone (Random House 2013)
- The Last Forever (Simon & Schuster 2014)
- The Secrets She Keeps (Random House 2015)
- Essential Maps for the Lost (Simon & Schuster 2016)
- What's Become of Her (Random House 2017)
- A Heart in a Body in the World (Simon & Schuster 2018)
- A Flicker of Courage (Putnum Children's, Penguin Random House 2019)
- Girl, Unframed (Simon & Schuster 2020)
- The Weird in the Wilds (Putnum Children's, Penguin Random House 2020)
- One Great Lie (Simon & Schuster 2021)
- The Epic Story of Every Living Thing (Random House Children's/Labyrinth Road 2022)
- Plan A (Random House Children's/Labyrinth Road 2023)
- True Life in Uncanny Valley (Random House Children's/Labyrinth Road 2025)

== Collaborations ==
- The World of the Golden Compass (BenBella Books 2007)
- First Kiss: A Collection of Lip-Locked Moments (Bloomsbury 2008)
- Through the Wardrobe: Your Favorite Authors on C.S. Lewis' ‘The Chronicles of Narnia’ (BenBella Books 2008)
- Literary Feast: The Famous Authors Cookbook (Classic Day Publishing 2009)
- Nightlights: Stories and Essays from Northwest Authors (Humanities Washington 2010)
- Hotel Angeline: A novel in 36 Voices (Open Road Media 2011)
- Seattle City of Literature (Sasquatch Books 2015)
- Mount St. Helens: A Summer Stories Anthology (Spokesman Review 2020)

== Awards and nominations ==
List includes official awards received and nominated for. In addition, Caletti has earned placement on numerous other lists, including ALA’s Best Books, New York Public Library’s Best Books, and IRA’s Best Books, among others.

- National Book Award Finalist (2005)
- PEN USA Literary Award Finalist (2005)
- PNBA Best Book Award (2005)
- Washington State Book Award Winner (2005)
- California Young Reader Medal Finalist (2005/2006)
- IRA Children's Book Award (2005)
- SSLI Book Award Honor Book (2005)
- Washington State Book Award Finalist (2006)
- South Carolina Young Adult Book Award Nominee (2007)
- Grand Canyon Reader Award Nominee (2008)
- Virginia Reader's Choice Award (2009/2010)
- CCBC Choices Award Winner 2010
- Best Books For Young Adults (2012)
- RT Magazine Lifetime Achievement Award for YA Fiction (2018)
- Michael L. Printz Honor Award (2019)
- Josette Frank Award for Fiction (2019)
- Best Fiction for Young Adults (2019)
- Best Fiction for Young Adults Top Ten (2019)
- Chicago Public Library Best of the Best (2019)
- New York Public Library Best Books for Teens (2019)
- Amelia Bloomer List (2019)
- Kirkus Best Book of the Year (2022)
- BookPage Best Book of the Year (2022)
- Booklist Best Book of the Year (2022)
- Amazon Best YA Book of the Year Editor's Pick (2022)
- Chicago Public Library Best Teen Fiction of the Year (2022)
- Amelia Bloomer List (2019)
- Buxtehuder Bulle finalist, Germany (2023)
- Deutscher Jugendliteraturpreis finalist, Germany (2023)
