= LTC Financial Partners =

LTC Financial Partners, LLC
- Industry: long term care insurance
- Founded: April 2003
- Founder: Cameron Truesdell; Craig Smith
- Successor: GE Capital
- Headquarters: Fort Myers, Florida
- Area served: United States
- Website: ltcipartners.com

LTC Financial Partners, LLC (LTCFP), based in Fort Myers, FL, was one of the largest long-term care insurance agency in the United States.

== Background ==
LTCFP (in California, LTC Partners & Insurance Services, LLC) was founded in April 2003 by Cameron Truesdell and Craig Smith. Truesdell was the president and a principal in LTC Inc., one of the early national agency firms for LTC insurance. Smith held the position of national sales manager within the same firm. LTC Inc. was founded in 1985 and built a sales force throughout the United States. LTC Inc. was later sold to GE Capital in 1997.

LTCFP was the original founder and a co-sponsor of the “3 in 4 Need More” campaign, which seeks to alert Americans to the long term healthcare crisis, and to multiply the number protected by long term care planning. The campaign is run by the 3in4 Association, a nonprofit that operates as a 501(c)(4) corporation. LTCFP spearheaded the association's creation and enlisted the support of insurance carriers, care providers, insurance agencies, and others concerned about the critical, growing need for extended care.
