= Lake Washington School District =

School district in King County, Washington, U.S.

Location
- King County, Washington United States
- Coordinates: 47°37′06″N 122°10′35″W

District information
- Established: 1944; 82 years ago
- Superintendent: Jon Holmen
- NCES District ID: 5304230

Students and staff
- Enrollment: 30,882 (2023-24)
- Staff: 3,115.95 (FTE)
- Student–teacher ratio: 18.26

Other information
- Website: www.lwsd.org

The Lake Washington School District #414 or LWSD is a public school district in King County, Washington, in suburbs east of Seattle. Its headquarters is in Redmond. As of 2020 it is the second-largest school district in Washington. It serves the region to the east of Lake Washington, one of the wealthiest in the Puget Sound area, though some parts of the area are well under the poverty line.

In October 2021, the district had a student enrollment of 30,500.

== Boundary ==
The district serves the vast majority of Redmond, almost all of Kirkland, the majority of Union Hill-Novelty Hill, north Sammamish, and parts of Bellevue, Cottage Lake, and Woodinville. The portion of Kenmore in the district is in the Saint Edward State Park.

== History ==
The district was formed in 1944 by combining three smaller districts:

- Redmond School District #208
- Kirkland School District #224
- Juanita School District #21

In 1944 the new district had seven schools; as of 2022, it has 56.

In August 2012, LWSD moved the freshman class into its four high schools, and converted the junior highs to middle schools (grades 6–8).

== High schools ==
=== Traditional high schools ===
Formerly operated as senior high schools (grades 10–12), the four high schools added the freshman class in August 2012. All compete in the Kingco conference in Class 4A.

High school	Location	Opened	Mascot	Colors	Approx. students	WIAA class
Eastlake	Sammamish	1993	Wolves	Crimson/black	2,481	4A
Juanita	Kirkland	1971	Ravens	Red/white/navy	1,778	4A
Lake Washington	Kirkland	1923	Kangaroos	Purple/white	2,081	4A
Redmond	Redmond	1965	Mustangs	Green/gold	2,304	4A

=== Choice High Schools ===
School	Location	Opened	Mascot	Colors	Approx. Students
Emerson High School	Kirkland		Dragon	Rainbow	60
Futures School	Kirkland				33
International Community School	Kirkland		Phoenix	Red/gold/black	400
Tesla STEM High School	Redmond		Python	Green/blue/white	603
Cambridge Program*	Kirkland		Ravens		

*The Cambridge Program is part of Juanita High School. The students in this program are students of Juanita High School, but are part of a different program.

- As of August 2020

=== Other high schools ===
- Lake Washington Technical Academy
- BEST High School

== Middle schools ==
All junior high schools (grades 7–9) became middle schools (grades 6–8) in August 2012.

School	Location	Opened	Mascot	Colors	Approx. Students
Emerson K-12	Kirkland		Dolphins	Blue/green	28
Environmental (EAS)	Kirkland		Cedar Trees	Brown/green	141
Evergreen Middle School	Redmond	1982	Eagles	Green/blue	1,238
Finn Hill Middle School	Kirkland	1967	Falcons	Blue/gold	655
International (ICS)	Kirkland	1997	Phoenix	Red/gold/nlack	249
Inglewood Middle School	Sammamish	1992	Knights	Blue/silver	1,265
Kamiakin Middle School	Kirkland	1975	Cougars	Maroon/gold	596
Kirkland Middle School	Kirkland	1976	Panthers	Purple/white	608
Northstar Middle School	Kirkland	1981	Patriots	Red/white/blue	90
Redmond Middle School	Redmond		Grizzlies	Black/red	1,057
Renaissance School of Art and Reasoning	Sammamish		Ravens	Purple/black/silver	94
Rose Hill Middle School	Redmond	1969	Royals	Red/blue/white	944
Stella Schola Middle School	Redmond	2000	Dragons/ 5 pointed stars	Gold/blue	90
Timberline Middle School	Redmond	2019	Timberwolves	Green/black/white	742

- As of August 2020

== Elementary schools ==
As of June 2020, there are 33 elementary schools in LWSD.

School	Location	Opened	Mascot	Approx. Students
Alcott Elementary	Redmond		Orcas	724
Audubon Elementary	Redmond		Owls	560
Bell Elementary	Kirkland		Bulldogs	440
Blackwell Elementary	Sammamish		Bobcats	557
Carson Elementary	Sammamish		Falcons	438
Clara Barton Elementary	Redmond	2018	Bobcats	612
Community School	Kirkland			72
Dickinson Elementary	Redmond		Dragons	353
Discovery Community School	Kirkland		Lighthouse	70
Einstein Elementary	Redmond		Otters	425
Ella Baker Elementary	Redmond Ridge	2018	Bears	550
Emerson K-12	Kirkland		Dolphins	31
Explorer Elementary	Redmond		Eagles	72
Franklin Elementary	Kirkland		Eagles	481
Frost Elementary	Kirkland		Roadrunner	441
Juanita Elementary	Kirkland		Jaguars	355
Keller Elementary	Kirkland		Snakes	313
Kirk Elementary	Kirkland		Eagles	639
Lakeview Elementary	Kirkland		Cheetahs	558
Mann Elementary	Redmond		Colts	383
McAuliffe Elementary	Sammamish		Challengers	586
Mead Elementary	Sammamish	2019	Mustang	666
Muir Elementary	Kirkland		Mountain Lions	397
Redmond Elementary	Redmond		Hawks	654
Rockwell Elementary	Redmond		Beagles	547
Rosa Parks Elementary	Redmond Ridge		Pumas	650
Rose Hill Elementary	Kirkland	1954	Racoons	487
Rush Elementary	Redmond		Cheetahs	681
Sandburg Elementary	Kirkland		Seals	444
Smith Elementary	Sammamish		Dolphins	677
Thoreau Elementary	Kirkland		Frogs	482
Twain Elementary	Kirkland	1955	Bobcats	659
Wilder Elementary	Woodinville		Wolves	369
Total				15,379

- As of October 2019
