= Lake Washington High School =

High school in Kirkland, Washington, United States

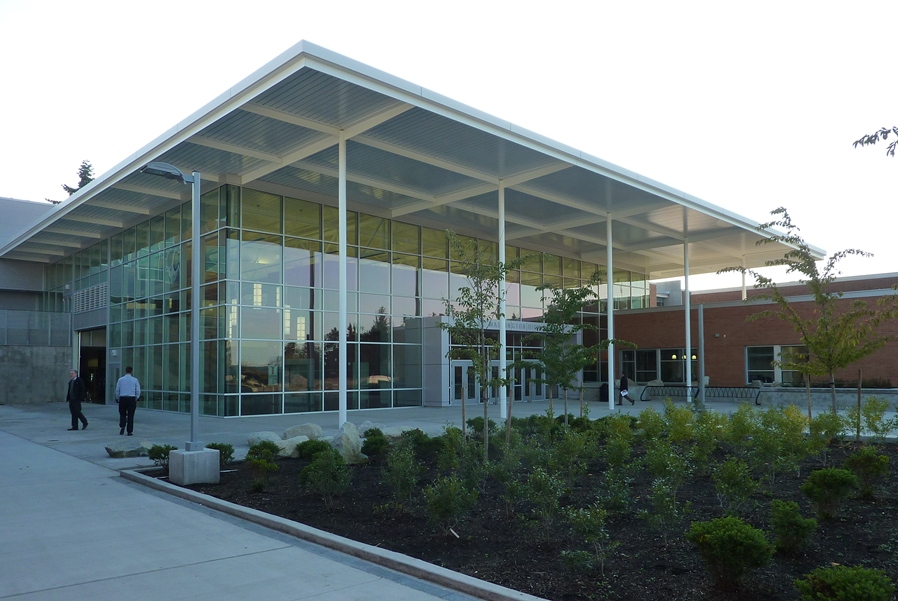
- LWHS main entry

Location
- 12033 Northeast 80th Street; Kirkland, (King County), Washington 98033; United States; 47°40′25″N 122°10′52″W

Information
- School type: Public, High School
- Motto: "Always Rising."
- Established: 1922; 104 years ago 1949, 2011 (renovation)
- School district: Lake Washington School District
- NCES School ID: 530423000674
- Principal: Christine Bell
- Teaching staff: 96.79 (FTE) (2022–23)
- Grades: 9–12
- Enrollment: 2,087 (2024–25)
- Student to teacher ratio: 18.31 (2024–25)
- Campus type: Suburban
- Colors: Purple & White
- Athletics conference: KingCo 4A (2024 onwards)
- Mascot: Kangaroos (Lizzy)
- Rivals: Juanita
- Feeder schools: Kirkland Middle School; Rose Hill Middle School
- Website: lwhs.lwsd.org

Lake Washington High School (LWHS) is a four-year public high school in Kirkland, Washington, a suburb east of Seattle.

== History and facilities ==
Lake Washington opened as Kirkland High School (also called Union “A” High School) in 1922, the only high school in the area at the time. It was originally located northwest of downtown Kirkland at the site of Heritage Park. With the formation of the Lake Washington School District in 1944, the high school was given its present name. It moved to its present location in 1949, with doors opening in January 1950. The former building became the junior high and was later known as Terrace Hall; it burned in a spectacular fire in 1973.

It was a National Blue Ribbon School in 1984-1985.

Formerly a senior high school (grades 10–12), LWHS added freshman to its campus in August 2012, and its feeder junior high schools (Kirkland Junior High and Rose Hill Junior High) were converted to middle schools (grades 6–8).

=== Mascot change ===
LWHS's mascot was the Hornet until 1935, when it was changed to the Kangaroo. The mascot was changed after the district learned the students were calling themselves the "horny hornets". The district punished the students by making them choose a different mascot. The students selected kangaroos as a joke, believing the district would allow them to keep the hornet as their mascot.

== Notable alumni ==
- Jill Bakken, Olympic gold medalist (bobsled)
- Carrie Brownstein, musician
- Deb Caletti, author
- Craig Caskey, former MLB player (Montreal Expos)
- Jeremy Enigk, musician
- John Fiala, NFL linebacker with the Pittsburgh Steelers (1998–2002)
- Dann Gallucci, guitarist for Modest Mouse and other projects
- Matt Hume, retired mixed martial artist; founder and head trainer at AMC Pankration in Seattle
- Nick Hundley, MLB catcher for the Oakland Athletics
- Cathrine Kraayeveld, WNBA player
- Ken Lehman, former MLB player (Brooklyn Dodgers, Baltimore Orioles, Philadelphia Phillies)
- Jeffrey Dean Morgan, actor
- Robin Pecknold, lead vocalist and guitarist for the indie folk band Fleet Foxes
- Skyler Skjelset, guitarist for the indie folk band Fleet Foxes
- Johnny Whitney, musician
- Frank Williams, former MLB player (San Francisco Giants, Cincinnati Reds, Detroit Tigers)
- Lana Wilson, director
