= Kirkland, Washington =

Kirkland
- City
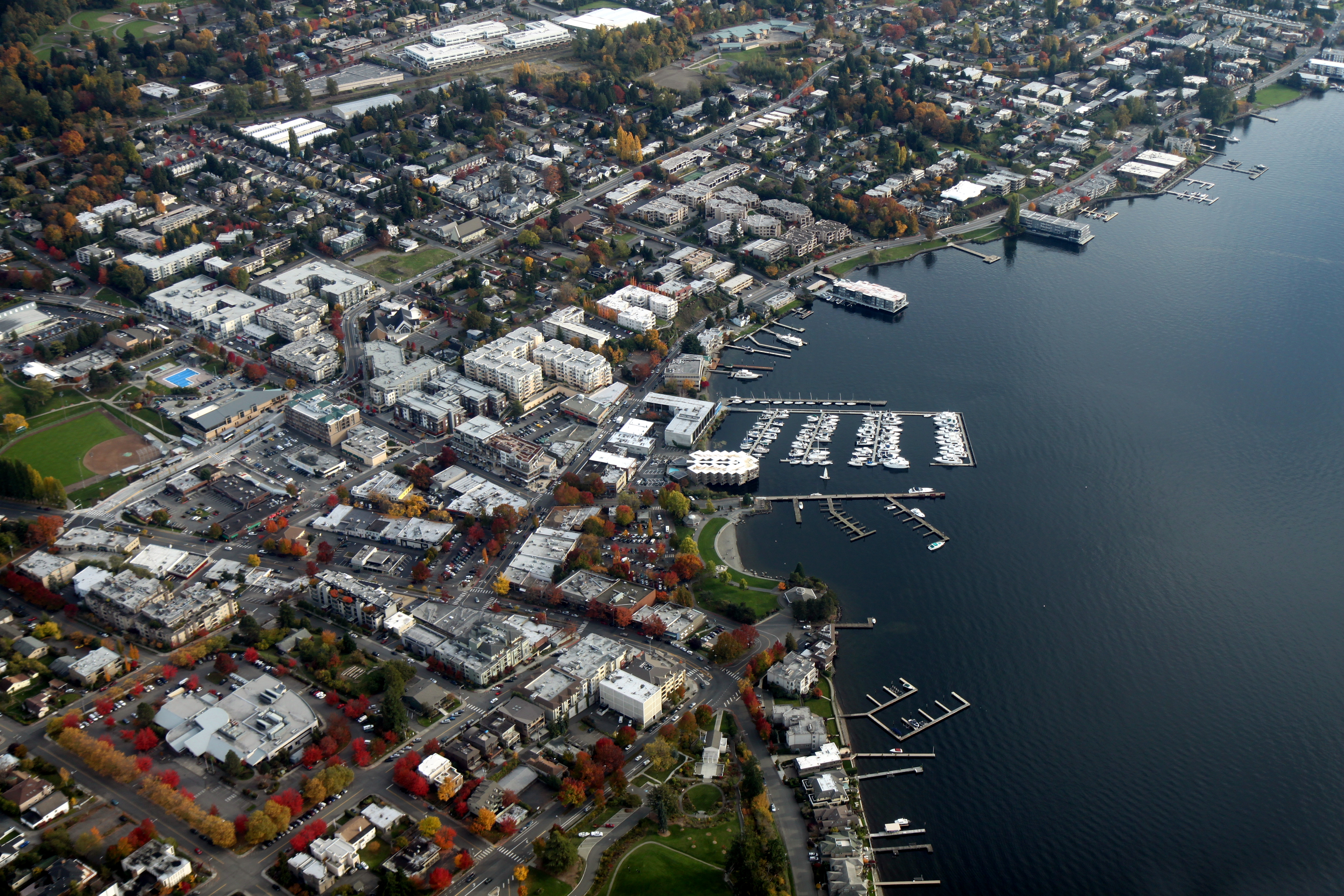
- The downtown waterfront area of Kirkland, on the shores of Lake Washington

- Logo
- Interactive map of Kirkland
- Coordinates: 47°42′00″N 122°13′30″W
- Country: United States
- State: Washington
- County: King
- Founded: 1888
- Incorporated: 1905

Government
  - Type: Council–manager
  - Body: City council
  - Mayor: Kelli Curtis
  - Manager: Jay Arnold

Area
  - Total: 22.66 sq mi (58.69 km^{2})
  - Land: 17.81 sq mi (46.12 km^{2})
  - Water: 4.86 sq mi (12.58 km^{2})
- Elevation: 43 ft (13 m)

Population (2020)
  - Total: 92,175
  - Estimate (2024): 95,499
  - Rank: US: 362nd WA: 13th
  - Density: 5,176/sq mi (1,998.3/km^{2})
- Time zone: UTC−8 (Pacific)
  - Summer (DST): UTC−7 (Pacific)
- ZIP codes: 98033, 98034, 98083
- Area code: 425
- FIPS code: 53-35940
- GNIS feature ID: 2411552
- Website: kirklandwa.gov

Kirkland is a city in King County, Washington, United States. A suburb east of Seattle, its population was 92,175 in the 2020 U.S. census which made it the sixth largest city in King County and the twelfth largest city in the state of Washington.

The city's downtown waterfront has restaurants, art galleries, a performing arts center, public parks, beaches, and a collection of public art that includes bronze sculptures.

Kirkland was the original home of the Seattle Seahawks; the NFL team's headquarters and training facility were located at the Lake Washington Shipyard (now Carillon Point) along Lake Washington for their first ten seasons (1976–85), then at nearby Northwest University through 2007. Warehouse chain Costco previously had its headquarters in Kirkland. While Costco is now headquartered in Issaquah, the city is the namesake of its "Kirkland Signature" store brand. American video game company Valve was also founded in Kirkland.

== History ==
The land around Lake Washington to the east of Seattle was first settled by bands of the indigenous Duwamish people, including the x̌ačua’bš ("lake people") and təbɬtubixʷabš ("people of the loamy place" or "ochre-painted people"). Several Duwamish village sites lie within the modern-day boundaries of Kirkland, including staɬaɬ ("a fathom measure") in the modern-day downtown and təbɬtubixʷ ("loamy place" or "ochre-painted") at Juanita Bay. The indigenous settlements were close to natural resources, including salmon, venison, and wapato plants harvested for their bulbs. Disease such as smallpox eliminated a majority of the local indigenous population with the development around Lake Washington, including lowering the water level for the Ship Canal in 1916 left the remaining population to decline further.

English settlers arrived in the late 1860s, when the McGregor and Popham families built homesteads in what is now the Houghton neighborhood. Four miles (6 km) to the north people also settled near what is now called Juanita Bay, a favored campsite of the Duwamish because of the abundance of wapato there. The Curtis family arrived in the area in the 1870s, followed by the French family in 1872. The Forbes family homesteaded what is now Juanita Beach Park in 1876, and settled on Rose Hill in 1877. Gradually, additional people settled in the area, and by the end of the 1880s a small number of logging, farming and boatbuilding communities were established.

Kirkland in 1912, at the modern-day intersection of Fourth Avenue and First Street overlooking Lake Washington.

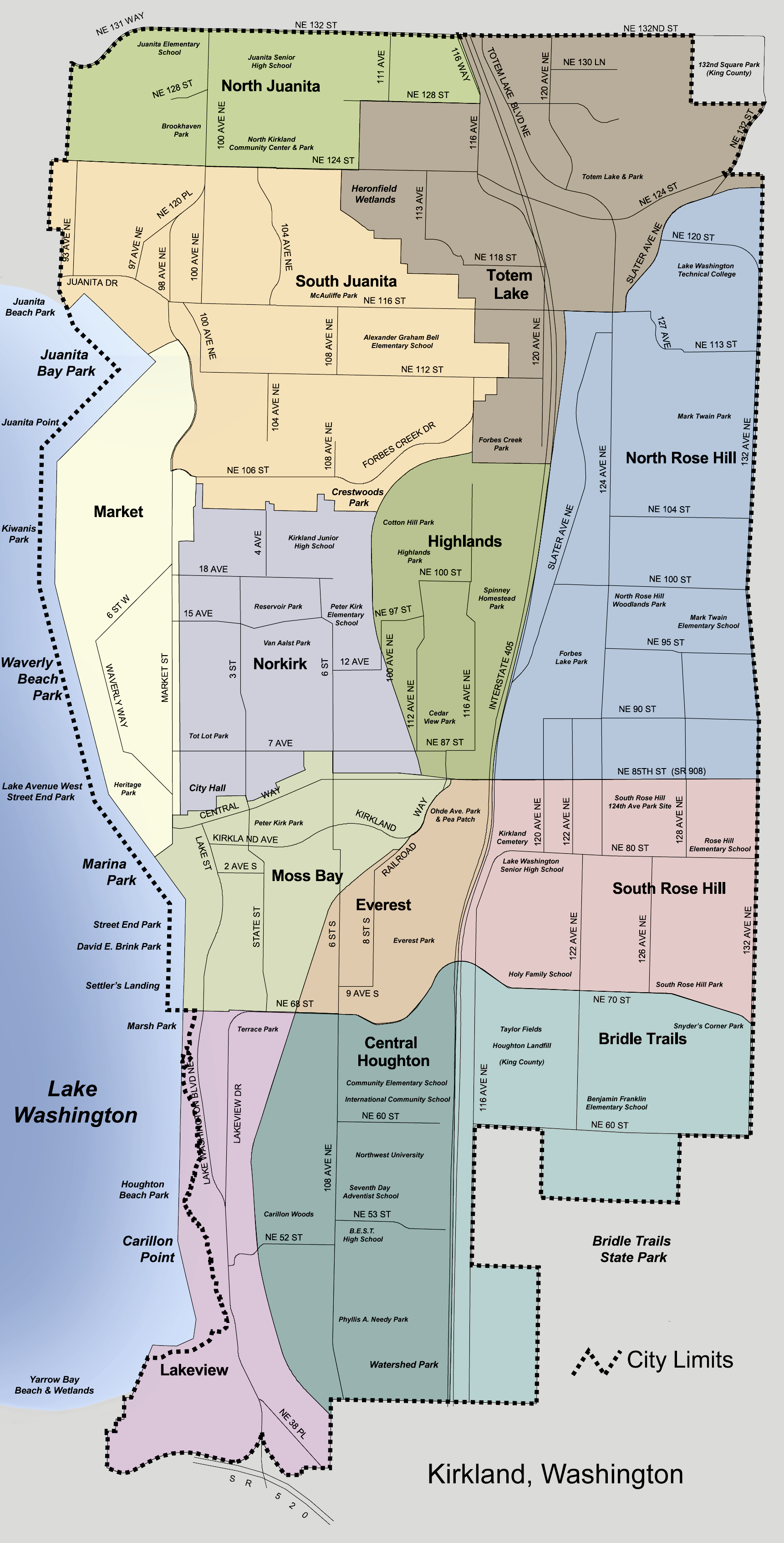
Map of Kirkland neighborhoods in 2006, prior to several major annexations.

Designated city landmarks in Kirkland

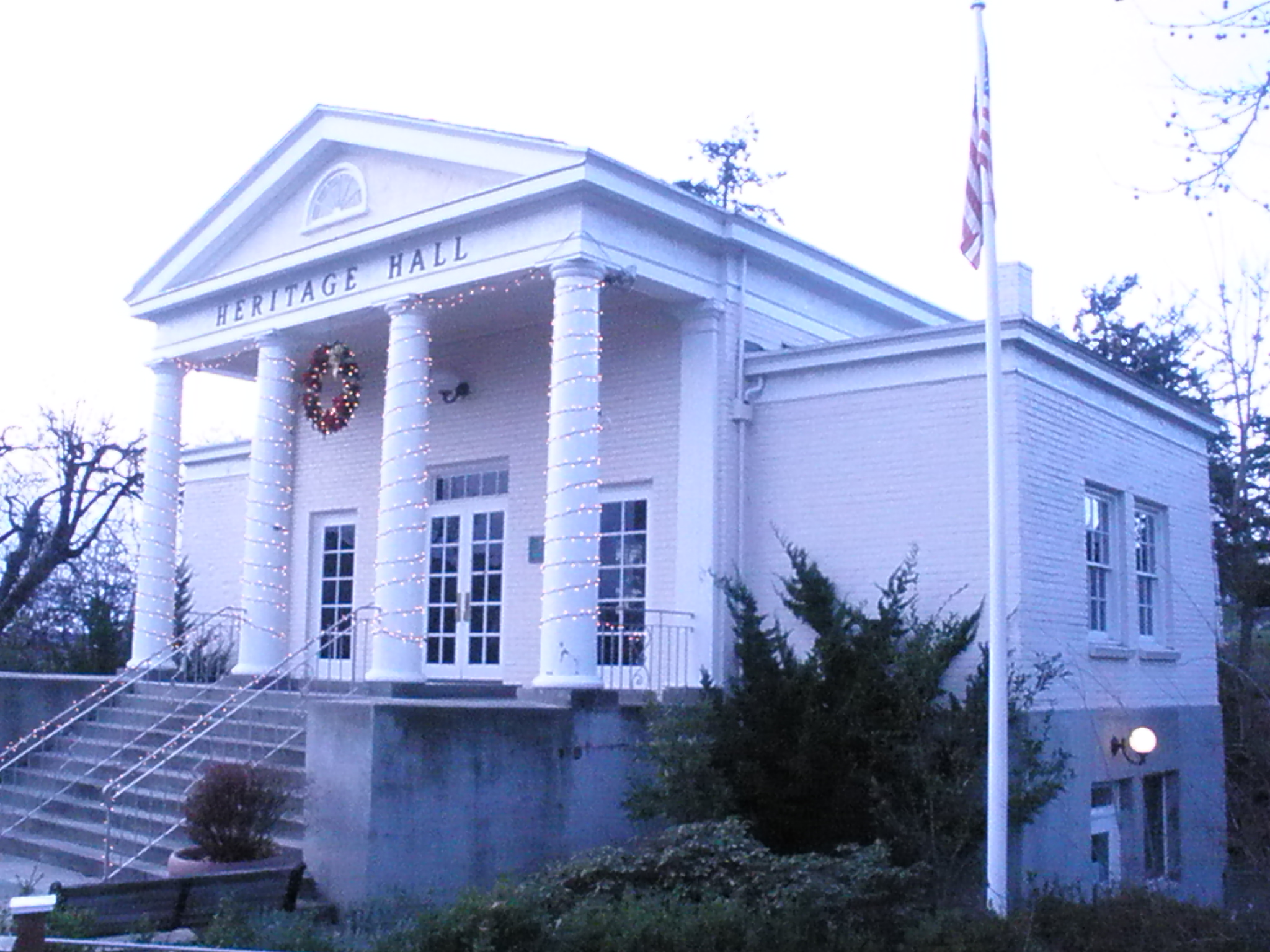
Heritage Hall (built 1922)

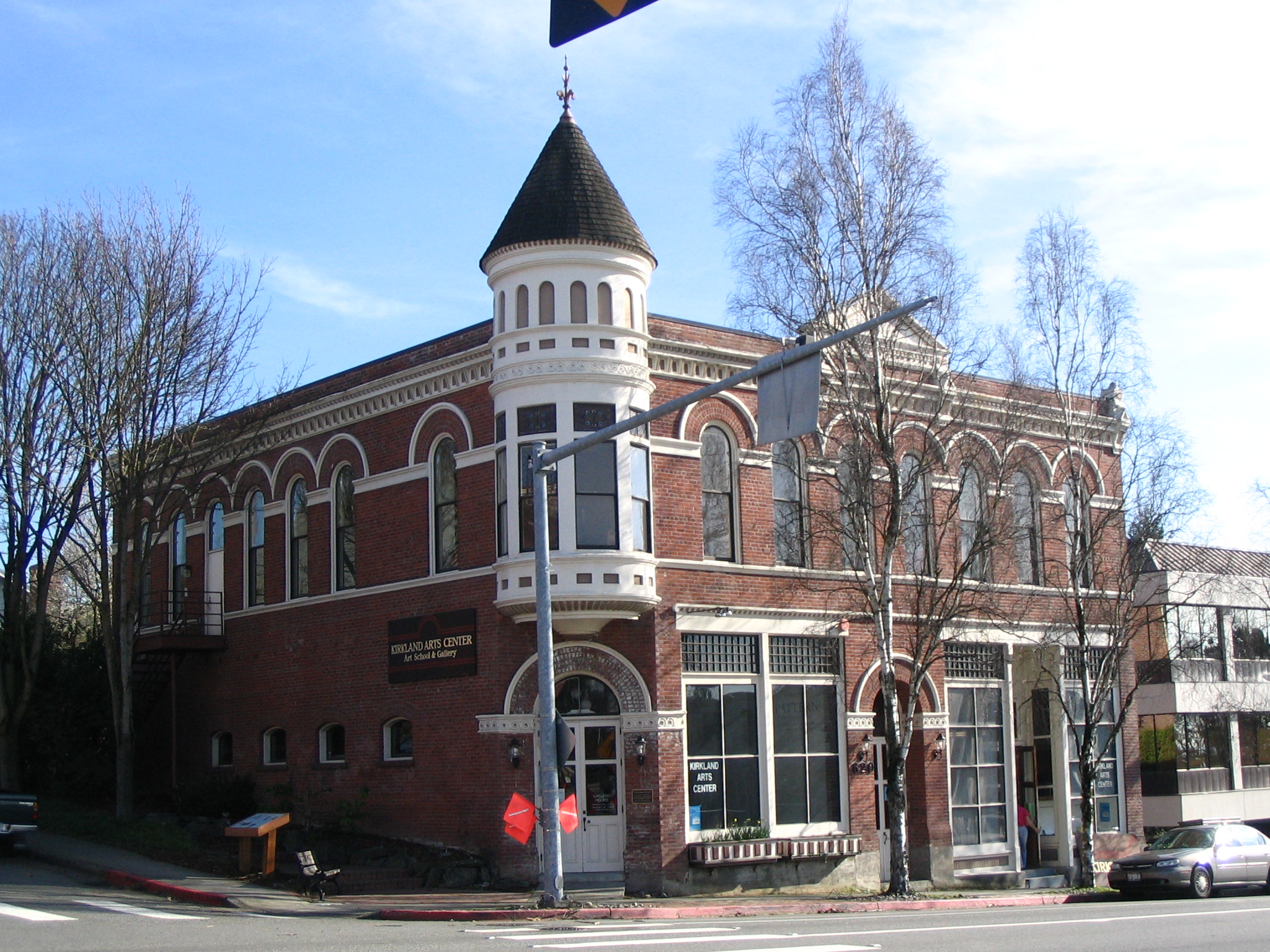
Peter Kirk Building (built 1890–1892)

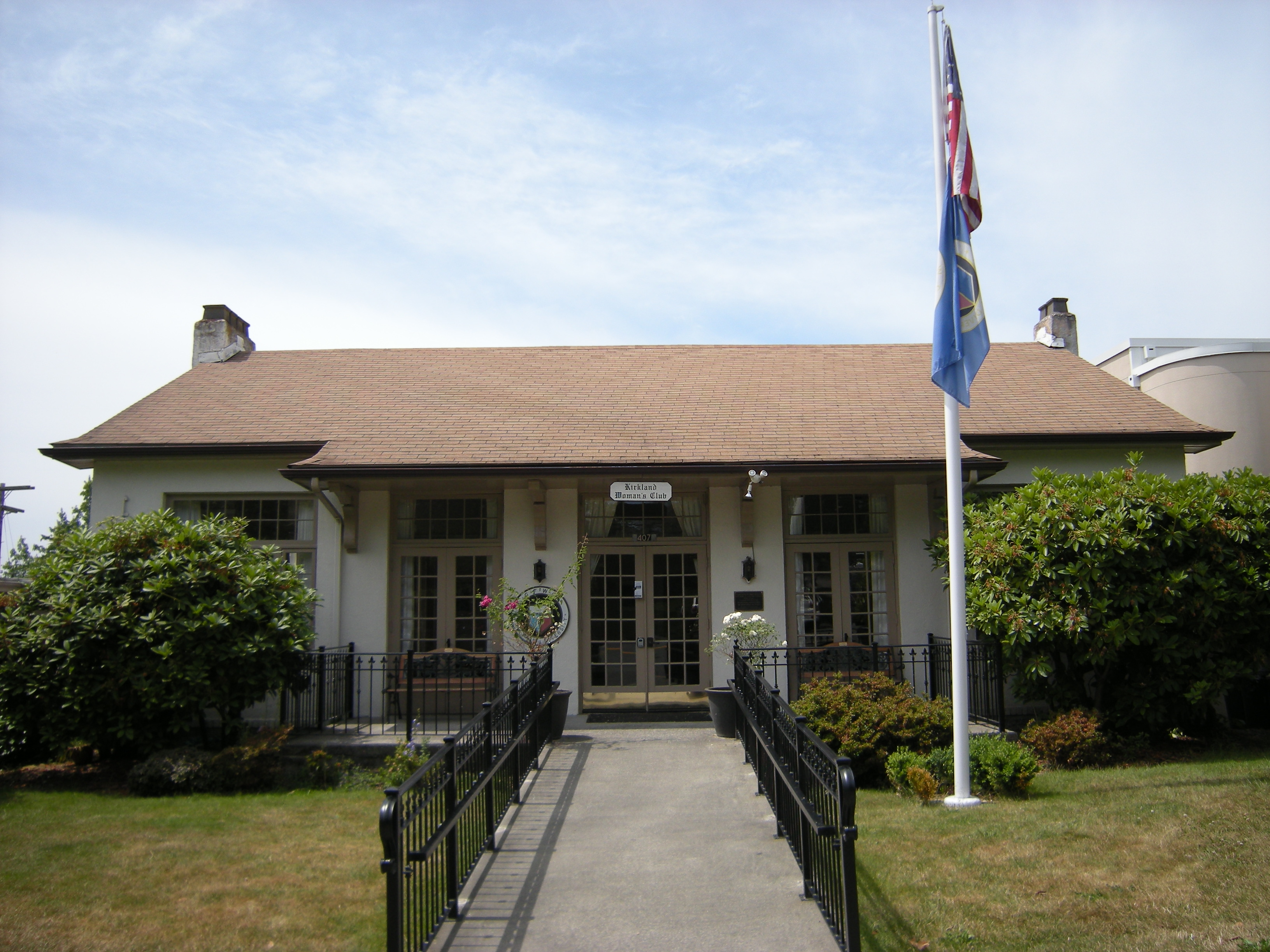
Kirkland Woman's Club (built 1925)

In 1886, Peter Kirk, a British-born enterprising businessman seeking to expand the family's Moss Bay steel production company, moved to Washington after hearing that iron deposits had been discovered in the Cascade Range. Other necessary components such as limestone, needed in steel smelting, were readily available in the area. Further yet, a small number of coal mines (a required fuel source for steel mills) had recently been established nearby in Newcastle and train lines were already under construction. Plans were also underway to build the Lake Washington Ship Canal.

Kirk realized that if a town were built near the water it would be a virtual freshwater port to the sea, as well as help support any prospective mill. At the time, however, Kirk was not a U.S. citizen and could not purchase any land. Leigh S. J. Hunt, then owner of the Seattle Post-Intelligencer, offered to partner with Kirk and buy the necessary real estate.

Under their new venture, the Kirkland Land and Development Company, Kirk and Hunt purchased thousands of acres of land in what is now Kirkland's downtown in July 1888. Kirk and his associates started the construction of a new steel mill soon after, named the Moss Bay Iron and Steel Company of America. After founding the city of Kirkland in 1888, officially one of the earliest on the Eastside at the time, Kirk's vision of a "Pittsburgh of the West" was beginning to take form. Construction soon commenced on several substantial brick homes and business blocks that would house and serve the steel mill employees.

However, the Seattle, Lake Shore and Eastern Railway, which had recently been purchased by Tacoma-based Northern Pacific, had now refused to construct a rail line to the lake. This would, after all, have a negative impact on Tacoma, which was furiously competing with Seattle as the dominant Puget Sound seaport. The ensuing financial issues and numerous obstacles took a toll on Kirk, who was running out of investors. Hunt was also in debt from the purchase of land.

Nevertheless, the plans continued and the steel mill was eventually completed in late 1892 on Rose Hill (a full 2 miles (3 km) from the lake's shore). Financial issues arose and due to the Panic of 1893 the mill subsequently closed without ever producing any steel. In spite of everything, Kirk was determined not to give up on his namesake town, and Kirkland was finally incorporated in 1905 with a population of approximately 532. A final attempt at a steel mill in Kirkland was planned by James A. Moore in 1906. His Northwestern Iron & Steel Company paid $250,000 in cash for a 1,500-acre (6.1 km^{2}) site, but the mill never materialized. This came at the heels of the Pacific Steel Company, incorporated earlier in 1906 by J.F. Duthie, William Calvert and L.S. Cragin. This company soon amounted to nothing.

In 1900, the Curtis family made a living operating a ferry-construction business on Lake Washington. Along with Captain John Anderson, the Curtises were among the first to run ferries in the area. Leschi, first operated on December 27, 1913, was the original wooden ferry to transport automobiles and people between the Eastside and Madison Park until her retirement in 1950. The ferry operations ran nearly continuously for 18 hours each day. The construction of the first Lake Washington floating bridge in 1940, however, made ferry service unprofitable and eventually led to its cancellation. Subsequent years saw wool milling and warship building become the major industries.

By 1917, after the completion of the Lake Washington Ship Canal, the construction of ocean-going vessels had become a major business. By 1940, the thriving Lake Washington Shipyard had constructed more than 25 warships during World War II for the U.S. Navy, on what is now Carillon Point.

=== Annexations ===
Since the incorporation of Kirkland in 1905, the city has grown to approximately 12 times its original geographic boundaries, nearly doubling in size during the 1940s and 1960s.

Kirkland consolidated with the neighboring town of Houghton on July 31, 1968, to form one city of 13,500. It annexed the neighborhood of Totem Lake in 1974, and the neighborhoods of South Juanita, North Rose Hill, and South Rose Hill in 1988, which were the largest annexations undertaken in Washington in nearly two decades. This added a further 16,119 people to Kirkland's population and was responsible for 76 percent of Kirkland's population increase between 1980 and 1990.

On November 3, 2009, responding to a county initiative to encourage cities to annex or incorporate many of the unincorporated areas within the county, as well as a state sales tax incentive intended to ease the process, three previously unincorporated districts north of the city—Finn Hill, North Juanita, and Kingsgate—voted on whether to annex to Kirkland. The measure failed by seven votes to reach the 60% margin, which was required because the measure included accepting a share of the city's voter-approved debt. However, since the affirmative vote was over 50%, the city council could and did vote to accept the annexation, without the assumption of debt.

The annexation added 33,000 residents (combined total population of around 80,000) and nearly 7 square miles (18 km^{2}) to Kirkland on June 1, 2011. For a 10-year period from 2011 to 2021, the city was eligible and filed annually for a special Annexation State Sales Tax Credit (ASTC) from the State of Washington to bridge the millions of dollars deficit in providing municipal services in the annexation area. The ASTC expired in 2021.

== Geography ==
The city's downtown lies along Lake Washington's Moss Bay and includes a business district, restaurants, art galleries, and parks. Downtown and the surrounding Moss Bay neighborhood has thousands of condominiums and apartments, largely built since the 1990s. Kirkland is among the most compact suburban cities in the state of Washington, with a higher population density than most Eastside cities.

Kirkland is accessible via Interstate 405, which connects it with other Eastside cities, including Bellevue, Renton, and Bothell. Seattle, which is across Lake Washington to the west of Kirkland, as well as Redmond to the east, are both accessible through State Route 520.

According to the United States Census Bureau, the city has a total area of 17.83 square miles (46.18 km^{2}), of which 17.818 square miles (46.15 km^{2}) are land and 0.012 square miles (0.03 km^{2}) are water. The elevation varies from 14 to 500 feet (150 m) above sea level.

=== Climate ===
Kirkland's average temperature is 52 °F (11.1 °C), and the average annual precipitation 36.27 inches (921 mm). The highest temperature was recorded as 109 °F (42.8 °C) on June 28, 2021. The lowest temperature was recorded as −5 °F (−20.6 °C) in January 1950.

Climate data for Kirkland, Washington
Month	Jan	Feb	Mar	Apr	May	Jun	Jul	Aug	Sep	Oct	Nov	Dec	Year
Record high °F (°C)	66 (19)	70 (21)	79 (26)	90 (32)	94 (34)	109 (43)	103 (39)	101 (38)	100 (38)	89 (32)	74 (23)	64 (18)	109 (43)
Mean daily maximum °F (°C)	43 (6)	47 (8)	54 (12)	59 (15)	64 (18)	70 (21)	77 (25)	78 (26)	71 (22)	61 (16)	52 (11)	45 (7)	60 (16)
Daily mean °F (°C)	38 (3)	41 (5)	47 (8)	50 (10)	55 (13)	61 (16)	66 (19)	67 (19)	62 (17)	53 (12)	46 (8)	38 (3)	52 (11)
Mean daily minimum °F (°C)	33 (1)	36 (2)	39 (4)	42 (6)	47 (8)	53 (12)	56 (13)	57 (14)	52 (11)	46 (8)	40 (4)	34 (1)	45 (7)
Record low °F (°C)	−5 (−21)	−3 (−19)	11 (−12)	28 (−2)	29 (−2)	37 (3)	41 (5)	43 (6)	34 (1)	27 (−3)	5 (−15)	0 (−18)	−5 (−21)
Average precipitation inches (mm)	4.81 (122)	3.43 (87)	3.51 (89)	2.77 (70)	2.16 (55)	1.63 (41)	0.79 (20)	0.97 (25)	1.52 (39)	3.41 (87)	5.84 (148)	5.43 (138)	36.27 (921)
Average snowfall inches (cm)	2.0 (5.1)	2.2 (5.6)	0.8 (2.0)	0 (0)	0 (0)	0 (0)	0 (0)	0 (0)	0 (0)	0 (0)	1.0 (2.5)	2.1 (5.3)	8.1 (21)

== Demographics ==
Historical population
Census	Pop.	Note	%±
1900	264		—
1910	532		101.5%
1920	1,354		154.5%
1930	1,714		26.6%
1940	2,084		21.6%
1950	4,713		126.2%
1960	6,025		27.8%
1970	14,970		148.5%
1980	18,785		25.5%
1990	40,052		113.2%
2000	45,054		12.5%
2010	48,787		8.3%
2020	92,175		88.9%
2024 (est.)	95,499		3.6%
U.S. Decennial Census

As of July 2023, the median household in the city was $143,533 and per capita income was $88,015.

=== Racial and ethnic composition ===
Kirkland, Washington – Racial and ethnic composition Note: the US Census treats Hispanic/Latino as an ethnic category. This table excludes Latinos from the racial categories and assigns them to a separate category. Hispanics/Latinos may be of any race.
Race / Ethnicity (NH = Non-Hispanic)	Pop 2000	Pop 2010	Pop 2020	% 2000	% 2010	% 2020
White alone (NH)	37,438	37,024	58,847	83.10%	75.89%	63.84%
Black or African American alone (NH)	688	805	1,842	1.53%	1.65%	2.00%
Native American or Alaska Native alone (NH)	211	148	252	0.47%	0.30%	0.27%
Asian alone (NH)	3,497	5,465	16,387	7.76%	11.20%	17.78%
Pacific Islander alone (NH)	83	123	164	0.18%	0.25%	0.18%
Other race alone (NH)	107	241	926	0.24%	0.49%	1.00%
Mixed Race or Multi-Racial (NH)	1,178	1,896	6,473	2.61%	3.89%	7.02%
Hispanic or Latino (any race)	1,852	3,085	7,284	4.11%	6.32%	7.90%
Total	45,054	48,787	92,175	100.00%	100.00%	100.00%

=== 2020 census ===
As of the 2020 census, Kirkland had a population of 92,175 and a median age of 37.9 years.

20.6% of residents were under the age of 18 and 13.6% of residents were 65 years of age or older. For every 100 females there were 97.7 males, and for every 100 females age 18 and over there were 95.5 males age 18 and over.

100.0% of residents lived in urban areas, while 0.0% lived in rural areas.

There were 38,037 households in Kirkland, of which 29.2% had children under the age of 18 living in them. Of all households, 51.1% were married-couple households, 17.9% were households with a male householder and no spouse or partner present, and 23.9% were households with a female householder and no spouse or partner present. About 27.9% of all households were made up of individuals and 8.8% had someone living alone who was 65 years of age or older.

There were 40,019 housing units, of which 5.0% were vacant. The homeowner vacancy rate was 0.9% and the rental vacancy rate was 5.3%.

Racial composition as of the 2020 census
Race	Number	Percent
White	60,418	65.5%
Black or African American	1,909	2.1%
American Indian and Alaska Native	423	0.5%
Asian	16,485	17.9%
Native Hawaiian and Other Pacific Islander	179	0.2%
Some other race	3,313	3.6%
Two or more races	9,448	10.3%
Hispanic or Latino (of any race)	7,284	7.9%

=== 2010 census ===
As of the 2010 census, there were 48,787 people, 22,445 households, and 12,014 families residing in the city. The population density was 4,521.5 inhabitants per square mile (1,745.8/km^{2}). There were 24,345 dwelling units at an average density of 2,256.3 per square mile (871.2/km^{2}). The racial makeup of the city was 79.3% White, 1.8% African American, 0.4% Native American, 11.3% Asian, 0.3% Pacific Islander, 2.5% from other races, and 4.5% from two or more races. Hispanic or Latino of any race were 6.3% of the population.

There were 22,445 households, of which 24.6% had children under the age of 18 living with them, 42.3% were married couples living together, 7.6% had a female householder with no husband present, 3.6% had a male householder with no wife present, and 46.5% were non-families. 36.0% of all households were made up of individuals, and 8.4% had someone living alone who was 65 years of age or older. The average household size was 2.15 and the average family size was 2.83.

The median age in the city was 37.5 years. 18.8% of residents were under the age of 18; 8.2% were between the ages of 18 and 24; 35.1% were from 25 to 44; 27% were from 45 to 64; and 10.9% were 65 years of age or older. The gender makeup of the city was 48.7% male and 51.3% female.

== Arts and culture ==
Kirkland had a gallery district downtown until recent years when all but three galleries closed or moved away. The Kirkland Performance Center hosts a number of performing arts events. The Kirkland Arts Center, located in the historic Peter Kirk Building on Market Street, provides classes, workshops and community-oriented gallery space.

Kirkland hosted the annual Kirkland Concours d'Elegance at Carillon Point from 2003 until 2011, showing vintage and classic automobiles (and wooden boats) from across the country. The Porsche Club of America now hosts an annual Porsche car show at the Carillon Point location every September.

=== Teen Union Building ===
The Kirkland Teen Union Building (KTUB) in downtown Peter Kirk Park is supported by the city and a number of nonprofit organizations. It has two music stages, a recording studio, darkroom and year-round activities and programs for youth.

== Sports ==
The local Lake Washington High School lacrosse team defeated intercity rival Juanita High School in the state championship 8–7 in 2015 to secure a state title. The Lake Washington High School baseball team won their first State Championship (3A) in 2016, defeating Lakeside School 2–0.

Kirkland FC, nicknamed the Goats, is an amateur soccer club in the Western Washington Premier League, which began play in 2018.

=== Team facilities ===
Kirkland was the original home of the Seattle Seahawks; the NFL team's headquarters and training facility were located at the Lake Washington Shipyard (now Carillon Point) along Lake Washington for their first ten seasons (1976–85), then at nearby Northwest University through 2007.

The Seattle Kraken of the National Hockey League announced plans in 2026 to build a Iceplex at the former Houghton Park-and-Ride through a public–private partnership with the city government. The facility is planned to have two NHL-size rinks, a community center, restaurant, and team store. Ownership of the Iceplex would revert to the city government at the end of the 34-year lease with the Kraken.

=== Little League ===
Kirkland has two Little Leagues: Kirkland American Little League and Kirkland National Little League. Kirkland National won the 1982 Little League World Series championship; they defeated a team from Taiwan 6–0 on August 28, 1982. The 1982 victory was subject of the ESPN 30 for 30 documentary Little Big Men. It also was the home to Little League's 1992 Big League Softball World Series Champions representing the Eastside District Nine Leagues.

The Kirkland Baseball Commission provides recreational baseball for players ages 13–18. It is affiliated with the national Pony Baseball organization.

Since 1999, Kirkland has been the home of the Little League Junior Softball World Series, which is held each August at Everest Park.

== Parks and recreation ==
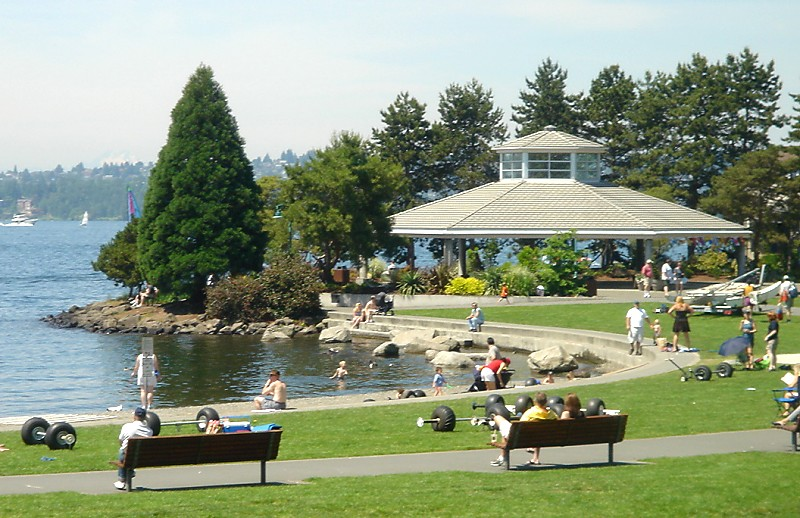
Marina Park in Kirkland

Kirkland's waterfront parks on Lake Washington are a popular destination during the summer months. Kirkland has neighborhood parks as well, contains a corner of Saint Edward State Park, and abuts the equestrian Bridle Trails State Park. The waterfront parks are linked by a gravel trail, which is open until dusk. Juanita Beach Park is another major park in Kirkland, and is a tourist attraction. The Cross Kirkland Corridor is a rail-trail that roughly bisects the city.

== Government ==
Kirkland has a council–manager form of government, with a city manager hired by the city council. The seven councilmembers are elected at-large for staggered four-year terms in non-partisan elections. The city council selects a mayor from among its members, who serves as council chair but has no veto power. As of 2024, the mayor is Kelli Curtis, and the city manager is former interim King County Executive Kurt Triplett.

== Education ==
The majority of Kirkland is part of the Lake Washington School District, which also serves other communities. The school district operates two high schools, Juanita and Lake Washington, within Kirkland city limits as well as five middle schools and thirteen elementary schools.

A portion is in the Bellevue School District and another portion is in the Northshore School District.

The city is also home to several private schools, including Puget Sound Adventist Academy and Eastside Preparatory School, as well as several public magnet schools including the Environmental and Adventure School, International Community School, B.E.S.T. High School, and Northstar Middle School.

Kirkland is home to Lake Washington Institute of Technology (LWTech) and Northwest University, a small Christian college. Additionally, Kirkland is bordered on the northwest by the campus of Bastyr University (which is technically in Kenmore).

== Economy ==
As of 2023, the city's unemployment rate was 3.5% and the top local employers were:

Rank	Employer	Employees in 2023
1	Evergreen Healthcare	3,924
2	Google, Inc.	3,265
3	Lake Washington School District	1,196
4	Fred Meyer Stores, Inc.	867
5	City of Kirkland	710
6	Kenworth Truck Co.	600
7	Astronics Advanced Electronic Systems	526
8	Salesforce, Inc.	508
9	Lake Washington Institute of Technology	380
10	ServiceNow, Inc.	371

== Media ==
Kirkland is served by several news sources, including:

- The Seattle Times, the largest daily newspaper in the Seattle metro area. It is designated the city of Kirkland's official newspaper of record.
- The Kirkland Reporter (formerly the Kirkland Courier), an online weekly publication of Sound Publishing (Black Press).
- The City Update Newsletter, the city's official newsletter. It provides information about city programs, legislative updates and neighborhood highlights.
- Currently Kirkland, the city's official video news segment. It airs every two weeks on Kirkland's two local TV stations: K Life and K Gov.

== Infrastructure ==
=== Transportation ===
In 2006, Kirkland was the first city in Washington to adopt a Complete Streets ordinance. Kirkland passed an Active Transportation Plan in 2009 specifically targeting improvements to pedestrian, bicycle, and equestrian facilities.

Kirkland is served by King County Metro and Sound Transit Express buses that converge in Downtown Kirkland, the Totem Lake neighborhood, and South Kirkland. The city also has several park and ride facilities along Interstate 405. Metro's buses connect Kirkland to Bellevue, Bothell, Kenmore, Redmond, Woodinville, and Seattle's University District. The city's first bus rapid transit line, the RapidRide K Line, is scheduled to open in 2030. It is planned to run from Totem Lake to Downtown Kirkland, Downtown Bellevue, and Eastgate. Totem Lake is also served by Sound Transit Express and Community Transit buses that operate on Interstate 405 with connections to Downtown Bellevue and Snohomish County.

The South Kirkland Park and Ride is planned to be the terminus of the 4 Line, a Link light rail line that also serves Bellevue and Issaquah. It was part of the Sound Transit 3 program approved in 2016 and was originally scheduled to open in 2041. Amid projected revenue declines resulting from the COVID-19 pandemic and construction cost escalations, the project's opening was delayed to 2050. The Sound Transit 3 program also includes a bus rapid transit line on Interstate 405, with stops at NE 85th Street and the existing Totem Lake Freeway Station. The NE 85th Street station is projected to cost $235–300 million, making it one of the most expensive bus projects under consideration by Sound Transit, due to the need to completely rebuild the cloverleaf interchange. The city's existing transit center is about a mile away and about 200 feet (61 m) lower in elevation. For a time the first aerial tramway in the Seattle area was discussed to connect the two. The station was originally planned to open in 2024 after three years of construction, but Sound Transit is delaying opening to 2026 due to revenue declines as a result of the COVID-19 pandemic.

=== Health care ===
Kirkland is served by EvergreenHealth, a public healthcare system that operates a 318-bed hospital complex near Totem Lake. It was founded in 1967 and opened the first phase of Evergreen General Hospital in 1972.

In March 2020, the city had the first reported fatalities in the United States during the COVID-19 pandemic, primarily related to the Life Care Centers of America nursing home in Kirkland.

== Notable people ==
- Dorothy Anstett, Miss Washington USA 1968 and Miss USA 1968
- Mark Arm, musician in the bands Green River and Mudhoney
- Chris Bingham, race car driver
- Gail Brodsky, tennis player
- Mitchie Brusco, professional skateboarder
- Dori Hillestad Butler, children's author, resides in Kirkland
- Tobey Butler, racing driver
- Deb Caletti, author, young adult and adult fiction
- Efton Chism, wide receiver for New England Patriots
- David DeCastro, lineman for Pittsburgh Steelers
- Tom Evans, MLB baseball (Toronto Blue Jays, Texas Rangers)
- Ryan Hall, retired runner, holder of U.S. half marathon record
- Marion Hutton, singer and actress
- Ken Lehman, MLB pitcher (Brooklyn Dodgers, Baltimore Orioles, Philadelphia Phillies)
- Ally Maki, actress
- Rick May, voice actor and theatrical director and actor
- Michael O'Hearn, bodybuilder, actor and model
- Evagoras Papasavvas, racing driver
- Robin Pecknold, singer, lead songwriter of Fleet Foxes
- Jennie Reed, champion track cyclist and Olympian (2004, 2008, 2012)
- Cher Scarlett, software developer and activist
- Travis Snider, MLB baseball (Toronto Blue Jays, Pittsburgh Pirates, Baltimore Orioles, Arizona Diamondbacks)
- Rosalynn Sumners, World and National champion figure skater, Olympic silver medalist (1984)
- Johnny Whitney, singer and musician
- Lana Wilson, filmmaker

== Sister city ==
Kirkland has one sister city:

- Emmerich am Rhein, Germany (1995)

== See also ==
- List of companies based in Kirkland, Washington
