= Joshua Sears Building =

- U.S. National Register of Historic Places
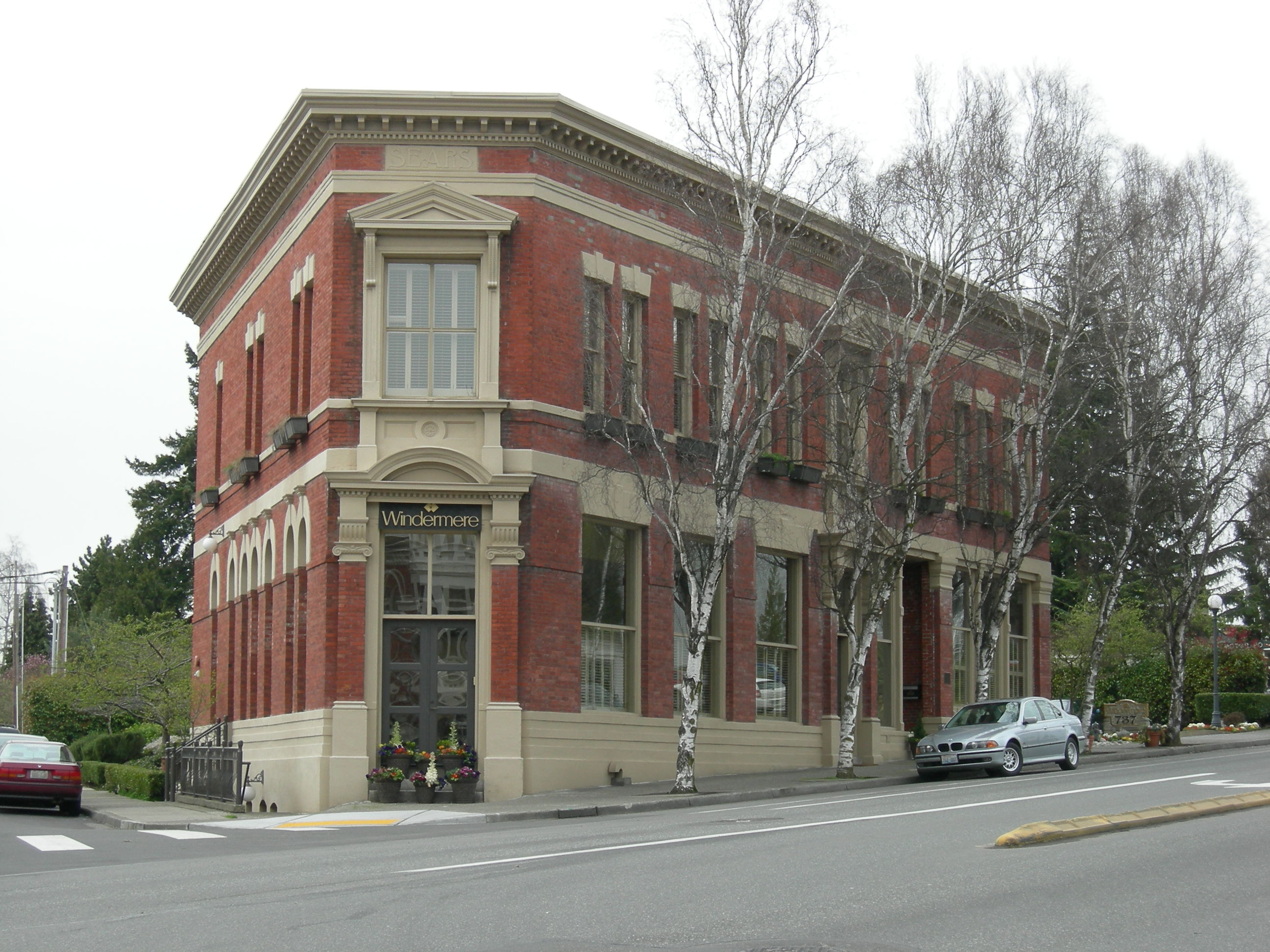

- Location within Washington (state)
- Location: Kirkland, Washington
- Coordinates: 47.68074°N 122.20981°W
- Built: 1891
- Architectural style: Romanesque Revival, Beaux Arts
- NRHP reference No.: 82004225
- Added to NRHP: August 3, 1982

The Joshua Sears Building is a historic building in Kirkland, Washington, located at the northwest corner of Market Street and Seventh Avenue, Kirkland's historic commercial core. It was built in 1891 by Boston philanthropist and capitalist, Joshua Sears, who was heavily invested in Peter Kirk's Great Western Iron and Steel Company and was the town site's largest landowner. As a result of the Panic of 1893, the steel mill and the bank intended to occupy this building never opened but the Sears building survives today as a reminder of what might have been in Kirkland. It is an early example of Beaux-Arts architecture in the Northwest, where Victorian and Romanesque Revival styles were still predominant in commercial buildings. On August 3, 1982, it was added the National Register of Historic Places. In December 2015 the building was purchased by local attorney Simeon Osborn and his wife Monica Hart, who stated they plan to keep the current business and residential tenants.

== Original and present appearance ==
A single detached structure, the building is an irregular polygon in plan, measuring 10′ x 81′ x 52′ x 42′ x 61′. It is two full stories with a full basement. The main business entrance is on the southeast corner with a second major entrance centered on the east facade. Reflecting the East-Coast influence of its builder, The building is predominantly Beaux Arts in design; a style newly popular back East but which wouldn't become common place on the West coast until the turn of the 20th century. The original architect is not known. Like its neighbors, it is constructed of locally fired red brick in the stretcher bond pattern. The foundation is also brick, and has been mostly sealed with cement parging on the exterior to protect against moisture. The roof is flat and covered with tar and gravel.

There is a continuous pressed metal cornice around the east and south roof lines. The cornice contains brackets, dentils, and a decorated frieze. There are belt courses of cast ornamental concrete over raised brick occurring at four levels: on the first floor under the window sills a wide band above the first floor windows; on the second floor as a continuous band window sill and just below the metal frieze of the cornice. This cast concrete is used throughout the exterior to imitate stone.

There are several types of window treatment. These are on the west facade: segmental with radiating voussoirs of plain brick and cast concrete lug sills; south facade: first floor, plain double hung windows; above these are a second row of small windows approximately 2½′ x 4′, semi-circular with cast concrete surrounds and pressed metal decorative keystones; second floor, standard double hung with shaped concrete lintels with raised keystones and continuous cast concrete sills; east facade: first floor, large fixed windows with transoms above and continuous sills and headers of cast concrete; second floor, the same as the south facade; the north facade originally had no openings, anticipating neighboring construction, but has since had several small fixed-pane windows added, as well as doors that allow direct access to the building's parking lot.

The main entrance, intended for the bank, is on the southeast corner. The door is recessed and approached by three granite stairs. Originally, there were paneled double doors but they have been replaced by a standard plain single door. The door architrave consists of brick pilasters with cast concrete bases and pressed metal Ionic capitals and a segmental pediment also of pressed metal. The second story window surround continues the classic effect with a triangular pediment supported by brackets over two double hung windows, since replaced by a single fixed, four pane window imitating the original. Above this pediment is a rectangular cast concrete cartouche bearing the name "SEARS". The second entrance is centered on the east facade and bears many of the same features: pressed metal pediments, etc.

== History ==
The Sears Building was built in 1891 by Boston millionaire, philanthropist and major Kirkland investor Joshua Montgomery Sears II (1854–1905) as part of the speculative land boom following Peter Kirk's proposal of building a steel producing mecca that would rival Pittsburgh on the east side of Lake Washington. Sears was born on Christmas Day 1854 in Yarmouth, Massachusetts, as the only son of Joshua M. Sears I, a prominent Boston grocer who had built the family fortune from the ground up, but died when the younger Sears was only two years old. With a yearly stipend from his father's estate and through a series of profitable investments, the young Sears amassed his own fortune. He became known as "The Boston Astor" and was reportedly the single biggest tax payer in the city. A major patron of the arts (he at one time owned the Jupiter Stradivarius) he is only remembered today through the famous John Singer Sargent portrait of his wife, Sarah Choate Sears.

The Sears Building was completed in June 1891 at a cost $18,000 (equivalent to $645,000 in 2025), at the time the most expensive being built in Kirkland outside of the steel mill itself. The bricks were pressed from local clay at Peter Kirk's own brick works on what is now Peter Kirk Park. Originally intended to house a bank at the corner, Sears outfitted the entire interior and even hired a partial staff but with the arrival of the Panic of 1893, the doors, like the steel mill, never opened. In the years after the bust, the building, like many others in the area remained mostly vacant, though it, along with a large portion of the original town-site remained in the ownership of the Sears estate. The corner space was eventually occupied by a printing company and later a grocery store. An electric supply store occupied one of the smaller storefronts for over twenty years. At one point the building's upper floors, originally intended for office space, were divided into seven apartments. On August 3, 1982, it was added the National Register of Historic Places. As of 2005 the building housed a religious bookstore and a real estate office. In 2015 the building was purchased by Local attorney Sim Osborn and his wife Monica Hart, the couple bought the building with plans to preserve its historic features and aesthetics for future generations.

== See also ==
- Peter Kirk
- Peter Kirk Building
- Masonic Lodge Building
