= Juanita, Kirkland, Washington =

Neighborhood of Kirkland, Washington

Juanita, Washington
- Neighborhood
- Location of Juanita within King County, Washington, and King County within Washington.
- Coordinates: 47°42′25.3″N 122°12′28.4″W
- Country: United States
- State: Washington
- County: King
- Elevation: 13–499 ft (4–152 m)
- Time zone: UTC-8 (Pacific)
  - Summer (DST): UTC-7 (Pacific)
- ZIP codes: 98033, 98034, 98083
- Area code: 425

Juanita is a neighborhood of Kirkland, Washington located along the northeast edge of Lake Washington. The area, one of the Eastside's most historic, was an unincorporated area governed by King County until it was gradually annexed by Kirkland in 1967, 1988, and 2011.

== History ==
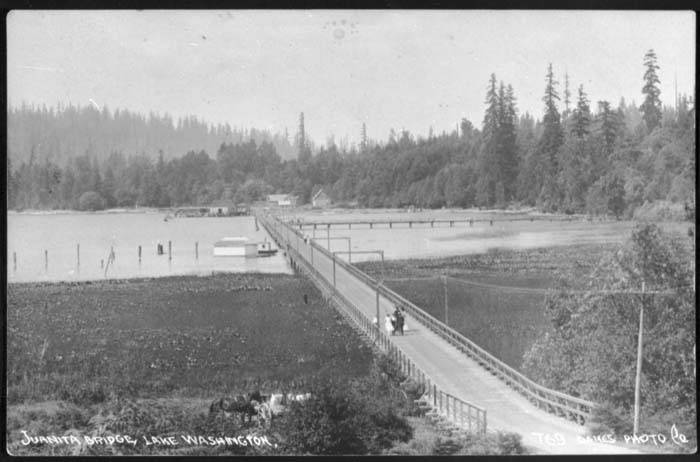
Dorr Forbes' wooden causeway across Juanita Bay, ca. 1910

Juanita Bay was first home to members of the Duwamish tribe, who had a winter village with three longhouses at the mouth of Juanita Creek in today's Juanita Beach Park. The village was known as təb(ɬ)tubixʷ in Lushootseed, literally 'Loamy Place' referring to the composition of the soil, known as loam. The bay was a popular place to harvest wapatoes, an aquatic plant with an edible root. Many of the Native residents died of smallpox in the mid-nineteenth century, but some continued traveling to the area by canoe until at least 1917.

Kirkland's earliest European settlers homesteaded in Juanita. Among them was Mary Jane Russell Terry, who is believed to have called the settlement "Juanita" after the 1853 Spanish love song Nita Juanita written by Caroline Norton. The earliest written reference to Juanita can be found in a settler's journal entry from 1873, where it is misspelled as "Waneta".

Martin W. Hubbard and his family established a homestead in Juanita in 1870, and throughout the 1880s the village and its post office, where Hubbard was postmaster, were known officially as "Hubbard" rather than Juanita. He would also establish Juanita Bay as a small port for steamers and ferries with the creation of a dock called Hubbard's Landing. In 1876, Dorr Forbes, a Civil War veteran, settled in Juanita. Forbes moved his original Seattle-area house, first built in Madison Park, across the lake by barge, though this structure would have to be rebuilt following a fire in 1905. Around 1890, Forbes constructed a wooden causeway to connect the village to Kirkland's newly-established Market Street. In 1902 Harry Langdon established a feed store and service station at what is now the intersection of 98th Ave NE and NE 116th Ave, which remains Juanita's central business district.

The area found new life in the 1920s as a resort community for Seattleites with the establishment of the Juanita Beach resort, now Juanita Beach Park, by the second generation of the Forbes family. The lowering of Lake Washington in 1917, a result of the construction of the Lake Washington Ship Canal, shrunk the size of Juanita Bay considerably, which facilitated its use for recreation. The town was given another boost in the 1920s with the construction of Lake Washington Boulevard, also known as highway 2-A, through Juanita. Businesses catering to the automobile were some of the first to appear along the road in Juanita. In 1950 a new, larger Juanita school was built to replace the small wooden one, and by the end of the decade most of the waterfront had been purchased by the county for public parks.

As the farms and large homesteads around Juanita gave way to subdivisions and shopping centers in the 1960s, the village began to explore incorporation at the same time that neighboring Kirkland was looking to annex the area. Most of what is now known as Juanita became a part of the city of Kirkland in July 1967. In 1971 a new, much larger Juanita High School opened with an open, experimental floor plan. In 1988, a section of unincorporated King County called lower Juanita was incorporated into Kirkland alongside the neighborhoods of North and South Rose Hill.

During the November 2009 general election, the unincorporated areas of North Juanita, a small area which is locally considered part of the greater Juanita neighborhood, Finn Hill, and Kingsgate voted to be annexed into the city of Kirkland. The annexation came after encouragement from King County, as well as provisions of the state's Growth Management Act that offers financial incentives to aid in the annexation process.

== Recreation ==
Juanita is home of or neighbor to a number of parks. These include:

- Juanita Bay Park
- Juanita Beach Park
- Heronfield Wetlands (located in pre-annexation Kirkland city limits)
- Edith Moulton Park and Windsor Vista (in the Juanita neighborhood)
- Juanita Woodlands
- O.O. Denny Park
- Big Finn Hill Park
- Saint Edward State Park (in the Finn Hill Neighborhood, within both Kirkland and Kenmore city limits)

== Transportation ==
The major arterial roads in Juanita are 100th Avenue NE, Juanita Drive, and NE 132nd Street. Juanita is served by several Metro bus lines.
