= Juanita Beach Park =

City park

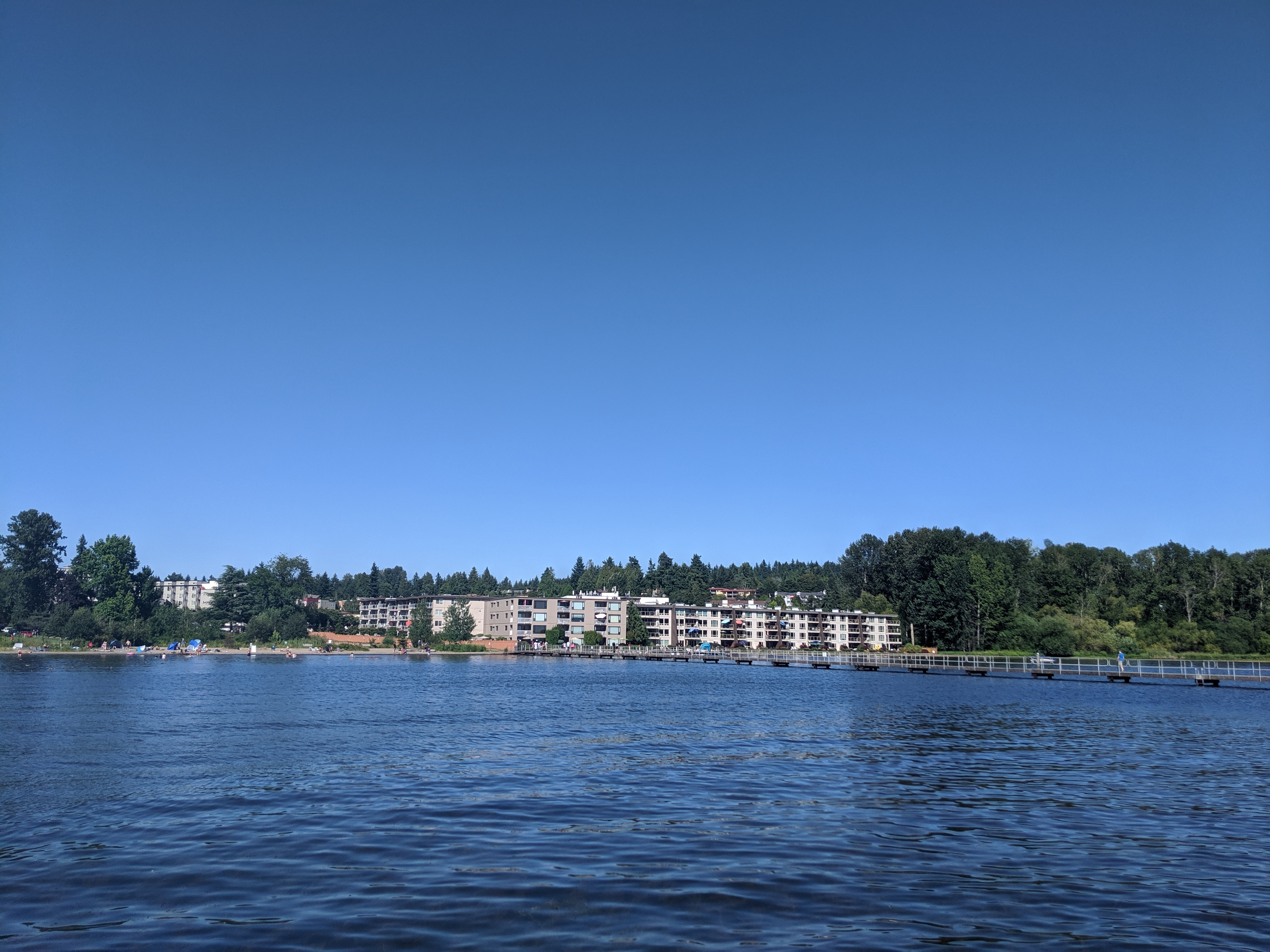
- Juanita Beach Park viewed from Juanita Bay.
- Interactive map of Juanita Beach Park
- Location: Kirkland, Washington, U.S.
- Coordinates: 47°42′19″N 122°12′54″W
- Established: 1956

Juanita Beach Park is a 22-acre (8.9 ha) waterfront park located on the northeast shore of Lake Washington in the Juanita neighborhood, managed by the city of Kirkland, Washington in the United States. It was historically the home of several popular private beach resorts before their purchase by the public in 1956. The park straddles thoroughfare Juanita Drive and features a number of amenities, including a pier, a playground, bathhouses, and athletic facilities. It is the busiest waterfront park in Kirkland's recreation system.

== History ==
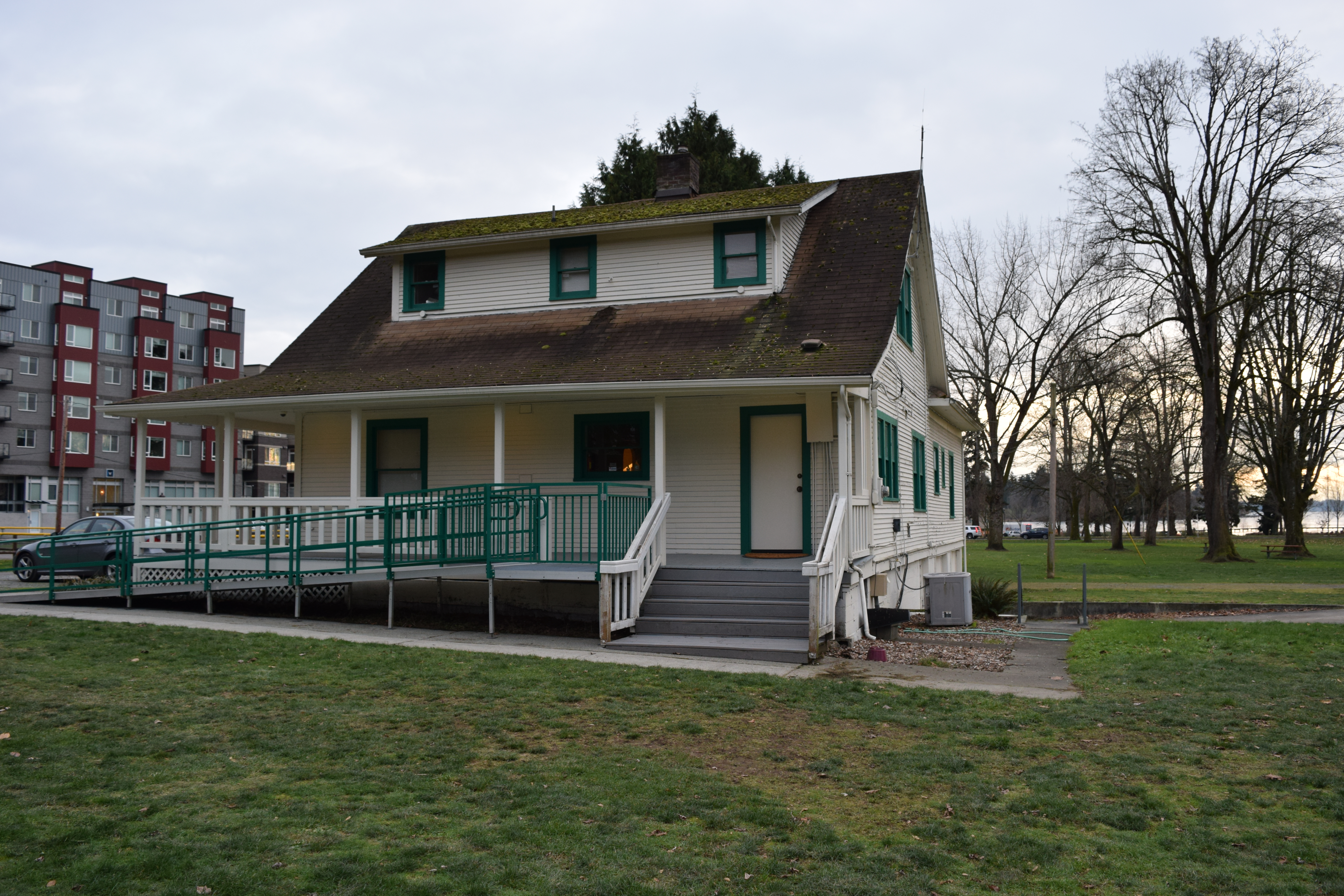
The 1905 Forbes house in 2016.

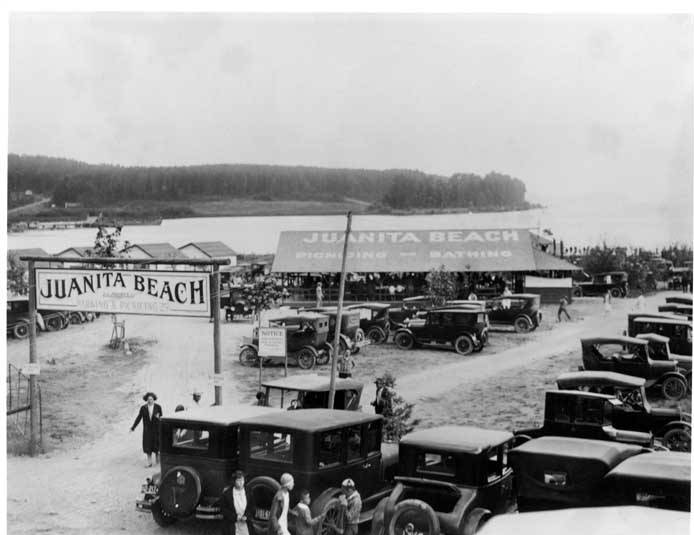
Juanita Beach Resort in 1925.

The Kirkland Heritage Society has called Juanita Beach Park "likely the most historic property owned by the City of Kirkland". Prior to European colonization, Juanita Bay (including both Juanita Beach Park and nearby Juanita Bay Park) was home to several Duwamish longhouses, collectively referred to as təb(ɬ)tubixʷ, Lushootseed for 'Loamy Place'. Between 1876 and 1877 the site was homesteaded by 33rd Illinois Volunteer Infantry Regiment Union veteran Dorr Forbes of Allegany County, New York and his wife Eliza. Forbes owned several properties in what is now Kirkland, including a farm at Forbes Lake, the future site of Peter Kirk's failed Great Western Iron and Steel Company endeavor, which is now sometimes called Lake Kirkland.

As a result of the 1916 construction of the Lake Washington Ship Canal, the lake dropped 8.8 feet (2.7 m) to match Lake Union's level, which exposed a white sand beach along what is now Juanita Beach. This, as well as the bay's naturally long shelf, which creates a shallow expanse of water out to 500 feet (150 m), made the site a fit for recreation.

The Forbes resort, called Juanita Beach, was opened in 1921 by Dorr Forbes' son Leslie and his wife Alicia. Over the course of several years, they built up a kitchen, cabins, a bathhouse, jukebox, dance floor, and sold rental swim gear to visitors. They faced competition from neighboring resorts, which were ultimately subsumed by King County's public park on the site.

Juanita Beach was popular and acclaimed even throughout the Great Depression. However, attendance fell following the Second World War, and after pollution issues temporarily closed the park in 1953, the Forbes family would ultimately sell the resort's land to King County in 1956. The county designated the land for use as a public park and subsequently purchased the adjacent resorts in 1957 to expand its size. Numerous investments in the park were made by King County throughout the 1960s and 70s, including a bathhouse, the park's concrete pier enclosing the swimming area, and the hiring of a caretaker to address crime.

The park's use fell sharply in the 1990s as a result of the county's lack of upkeep, which led to waterfowl feces and invasive Eurasian watermilfoil polluting and clogging the swimming area. Kirkland, which had annexed most of the previously unincorporated Juanita neighborhood in 1967, acquired the park in 2002 following the county's funding shortfall the previous year.

In 2006 the Juanita Beach Master Plan was undertaken by the City of Kirkland, which included environmental restoration and modernization of facilities. The bathhouse component of the Plan, which opened to the public on December 23, 2020, was honored with the 2021 Project of the Year Award for Structures Under $5 Million by the Washington Chapter of the American Public Works Association (APWA) and the 2022 Civic Design Honor Award by the American Institute of Architects Washington Council.

== Features ==
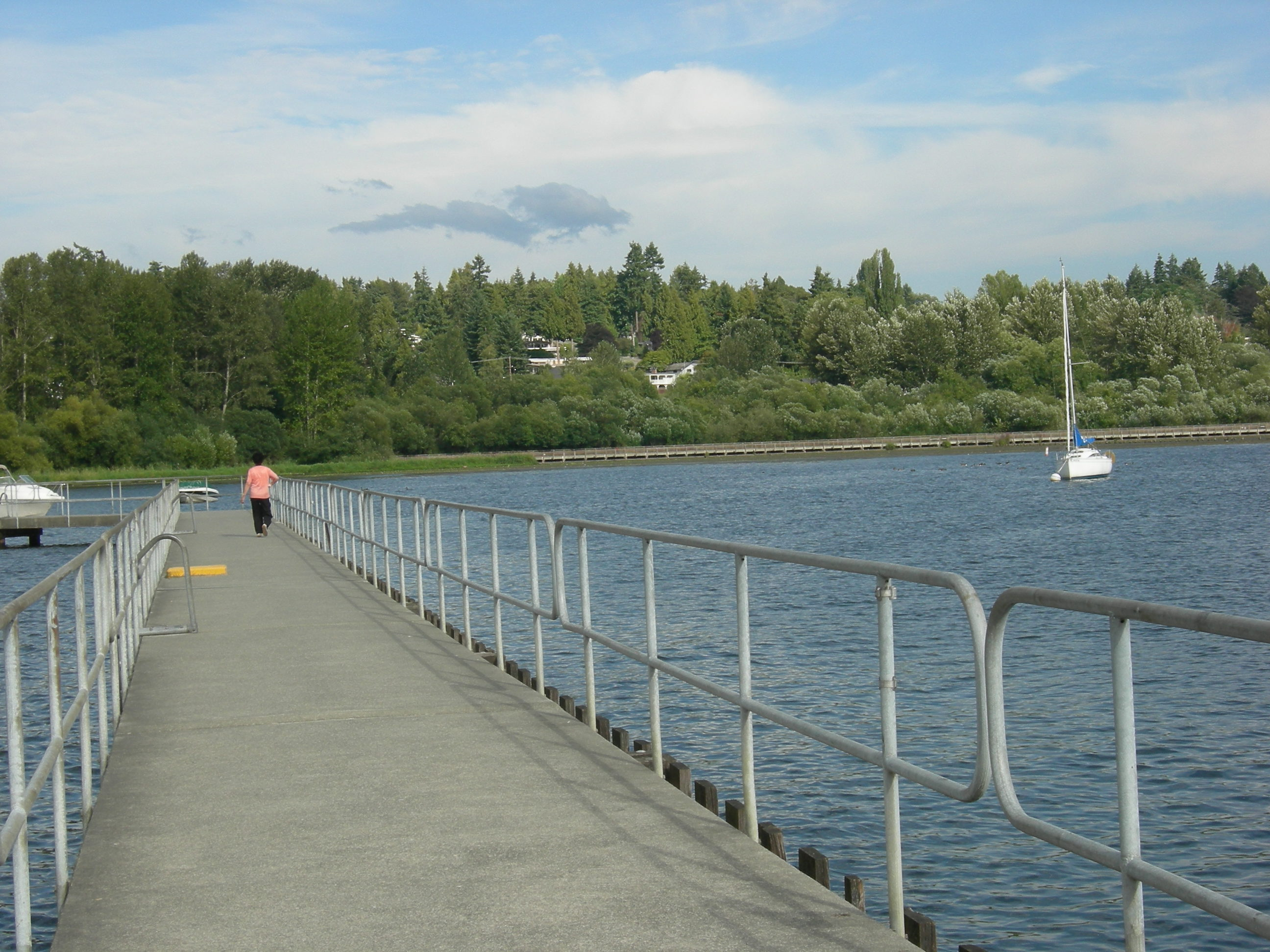
The park's pier in 2007, looking toward Juanita Bay Park.

Juanita Beach Park has two sections, one on either side of Juanita Drive, connected by at-grade crosswalks. The beach itself consists of approximately 1,000 feet (300 m) of shoreline. As of November 2022, amenities at the park include restrooms with dressing areas, heated year-round restrooms, outdoor showers, picnic shelters, volleyball courts, tennis courts, youth baseball/softball fields, and a playground. There is historical interpretation throughout the park, and the 1905 Forbes house still stands in the section north of Juanita Drive. The swimming area is surrounded by a concrete, U-shaped pier. Fishing is allowed on the pier and non-motorized boats are permitted to launch from the park.

Juanita Beach Park features a number of pieces of public art, including the wind sculpture Glassinator (2021) by Andrew Carson, Now and Then (2021) by UrbanRock Design, which features timber seating elements and historical images cast in metal, and Symbiosis (2010) by Joshua Wiener.

The park currently hosts a weekly farmers' market in summer months as well as public cultural events throughout the year.
