= Masonic Lodge Building (Kirkland, Washington) =

- U.S. National Register of Historic Places
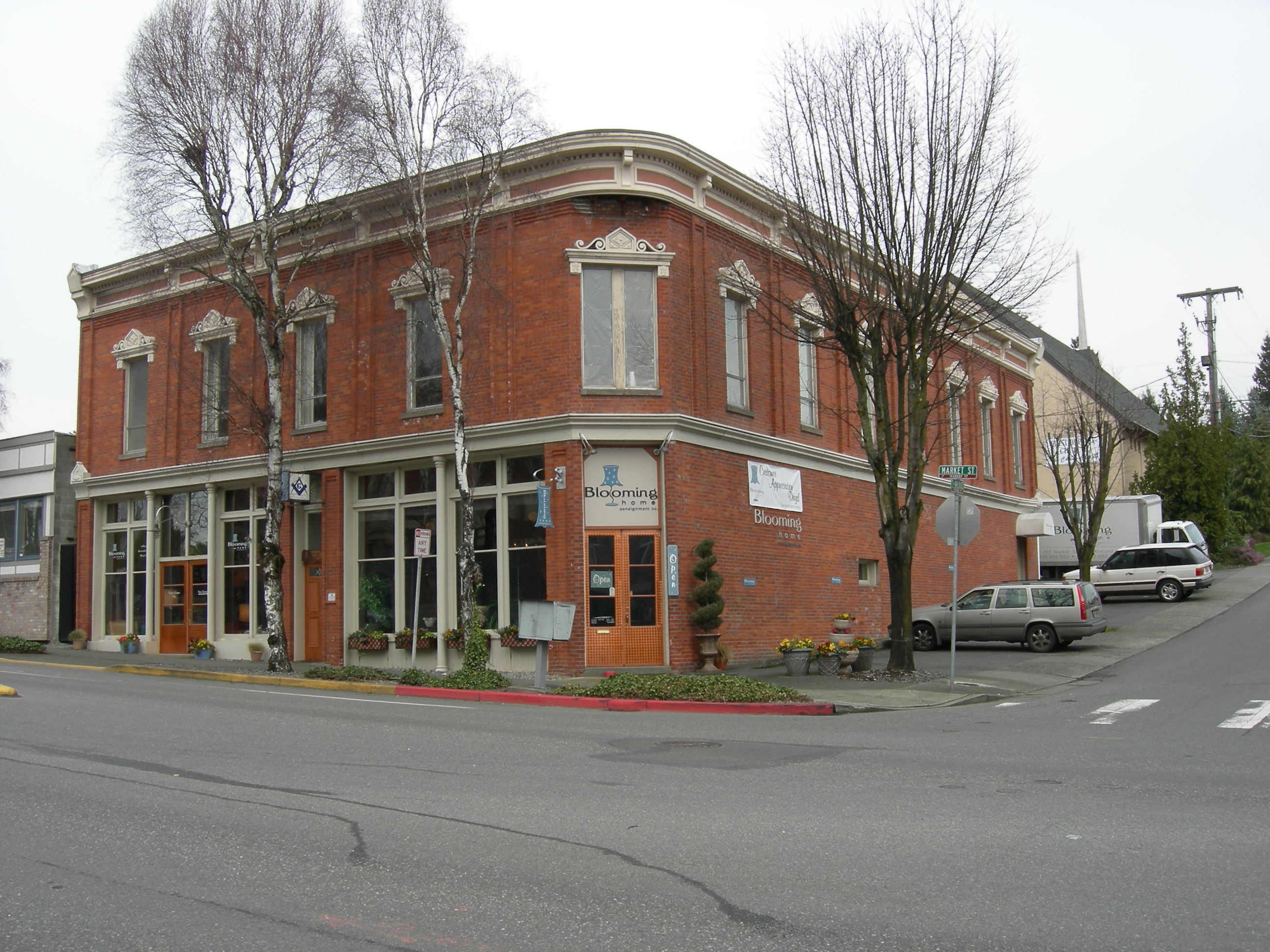

- Location within Washington (state)
- Location: Kirkland, Washington
- Coordinates: 47.68053°N 122.20932°W
- Built: 1891
- Architectural style: Victorian Romanesque
- NRHP reference No.: 82004224
- Added to NRHP: August 3, 1982

The Masonic Lodge Building, also known as the Campbell Building and first known as the French & Church Building, is an historic building located at 702 Market Street at the corner of Seventh Avenue in the historic commercial core of Kirkland, Washington. It was built in 1890-91 by Kirkland businessman and postmaster Edwin M. Church with pioneer Harry D. French as part of the land boom following Peter Kirk's proposal of building a huge steel mill on the east side of Lake Washington. Home to Kirkland's Post Office from 1891 to 1907, In 1922, The building was purchased by Kirkland Lodge No. 150 of the Free and Accepted Masons, which still occupies the building's upper level.

The building is notable for its sturdy brick construction and Victorian elements including a pressed-tin cornice and window caps. It remains essentially unchanged except for new aluminum frame windows installed by the lodge in the 1960s to replace the original wood double hung ones. On August 3, 1982, it was added the National Register of Historic Places.

== Present and past appearance ==
This is a two-story rectangular brick building with a flat roof. The building measures 54' x 79' with the southwest corner cut at a 45° angle to create a corner entrance. The exterior brick is laid in the common bond pattern.

The wall design on the street level of the west facade is alternate brick piers and 8" round, cast iron columns one story in height. The window and door treatments are typical storefront with large wood sash windows with transoms and doorways without decoration. There is frieze and cornice 'molding' above the window transoms at the second floor level terminating at the northwest and southeast corners in a decorative bracket and triangular ornament. The second floor of the west facade is given a pier effect by the use of vertical sections of raised brick at regular intervals between the tall rectangular windows. Original double hung windows have been replaced with Aluminium frame windows. Above these windows are window caps of pressed tin, featuring entablature heads topped by scrolls flanking a triangular ornament. These were most likely manufactured by the Mesker Brothers Foundry in St. Louis, Missouri, as the design appears in their catalogs.

There is a continuous decorated metal parapet with dentils, brackets and wide paneled frieze crowning the building, terminating at the northwest and southeast corners in a decorative bracket similar to those mentioned previously. Below the frieze are several rows of brick corbelling. The decorative parapet and frieze form a smooth curve around the angled corner of the building. Just below the frieze at this point was a plaster conch shell decoration which has been missing for several years, most likely due to deterioration. The corner has recessed nine foot wooden double doors at the street level, now sheathed in brushed copper.

== History ==
=== The Builders ===
Edwin M. Church was born in New York and spent his early years all over the midwest, serving in the 1st Iowa Cavalry Regiment during the American Civil War. After living in Kansas for several years, he and his family traveled west by train to San Francisco where they boarded the steamer Pacific. This steamer would sink off of Cape Flattery on its next voyage, killing all but two aboard. Church arrived in Seattle in May 1875 where he briefly lived near modern-day Auburn. His family finally settled on a large plot of land in Houghton on the eastern shore of Lake Washington by the end of 1876. During this time Church worked as a bricklayer while his family tended to crops. He eventually sold most of the property to other settlers, excluding the plot for his house, which he rebuilt in 1880 and expanded in 1886.

Harry French, whose father, S. Foster French had brought them to the area from Maine in August 1872, was one of the earliest settlers in what would become Kirkland. Their original home, though moved from its original location, still stands and is one of the oldest homes on the East Side.

=== The Building ===
In the spring of 1889, Church purchased the Kirkland grocery store of J.J. Tompkins and became a businessman. He was appointed Kirkland's postmaster in June 1890 and by the end of the year, with Peter Kirk's plans for the town nearing certainty, Church joined forces with Harry D. French, son of one of Kirkland's earliest pioneers, to construct a $12,000 brick building at the Northeast corner of Market Street and Picadilly (now Seventh Avenue) to accommodate their businesses as well as the post office. Church and French purchased the 4 lots on the corner from the Kirkland Land & Improvement Co. on February 13, 1891 for $3,100 (About $89,300 in 2019) but it is unclear whether the building, which occupies the southern 2 lots, was completed by this time. Though the building topped out at 2 floors, its walls were reported to be thick enough to support an eventual third floor if needed. In 1894, Church would be removed from the position of postmaster due to what reports called "offensive partisanship" (He would be succeeded by C.C. Filson, who would later found the Filson Company in Seattle). In later years, E.A. Brooks operated the grocery store in the building and lived upstairs with his family. When Brooks had his own building built further down Market Street in 1907 (still standing), he moved his store and the post office into the new quarters. In the 1920s a Mr. Evans operated a variety store in the southern half of the building for a time while the other storefront was used as a band practice space. In the later 20's the ground floor was used for automotive storage. The corner store was later used as a plumbing shop then a cabinet shop.

=== The Masons ===
In 1922, Kirkland Lodge No. 150 of the Free and Accepted Masons of Washington purchased the building for their meeting space, moving from an older wooden building a block away. The Masons remodeled the space by replacing the roof and removing most of the partition walls on the second floor. They rented out their meeting space for use by several other Masonic lodges. When a garage building was built to the north of the Masonic Lodge Building, they used its north wall as a bulkhead, weakening it and necessitating the construction of a retaining wall. Under direction of the Lodge, the basement, rendered useless by time and dampness, was filled with 15,000 yards of pea gravel and capped with a layer of cement that replaced the original floor in 1954. The then vacant store rooms have been occupied ever since.

== See also ==
- Peter Kirk
- Peter Kirk Building
- Joshua Sears Building
