= O.O. Denny Park =

Park in Washington, United States

Coordinates: 47°42′36″N 122°14′55″W

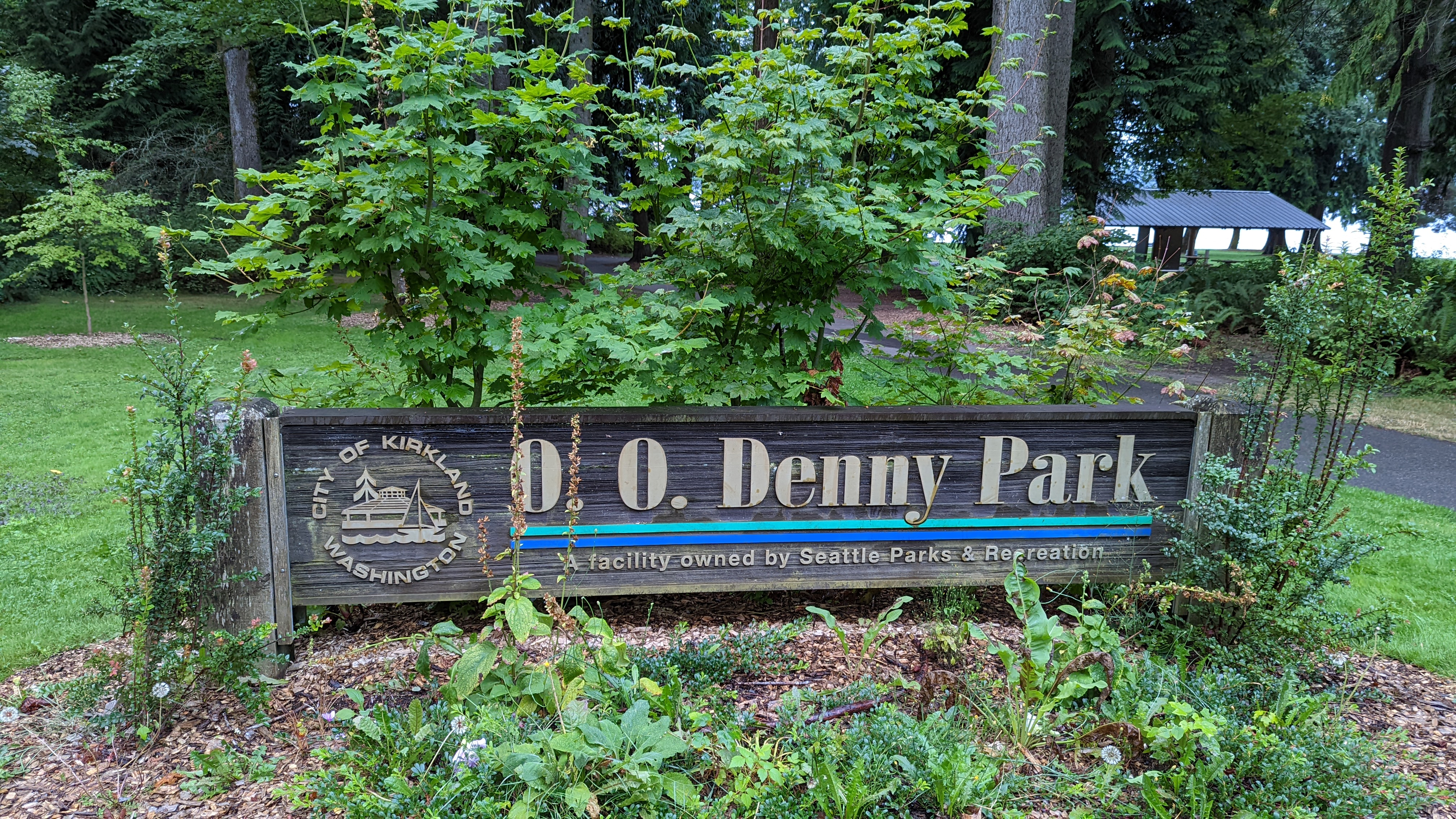
- Interactive map of O.O. Denny Park
- Established: 1922; 104 years ago

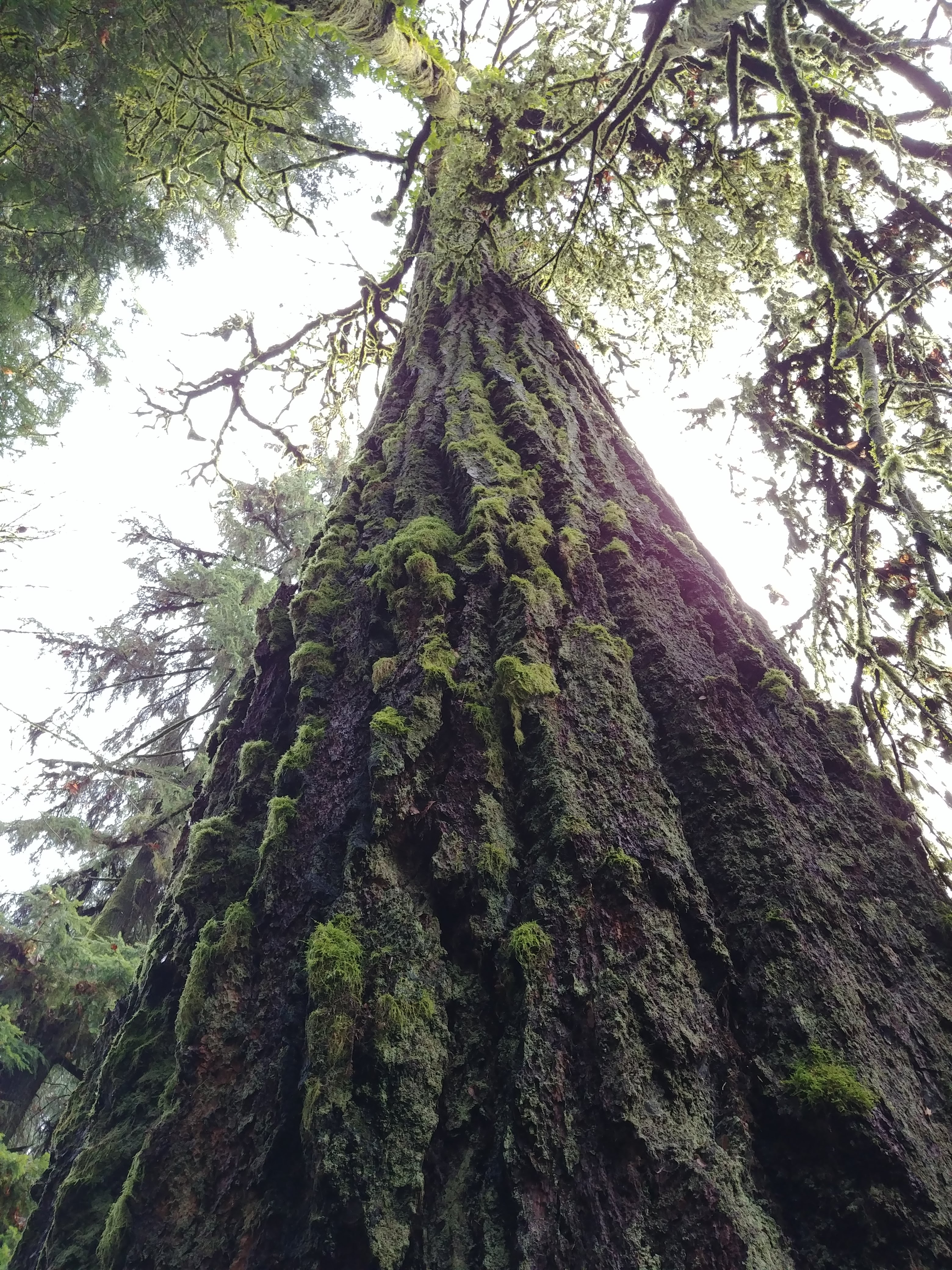
Sylvia, the large Douglas fir in O.O. Denny Park

O.O. Denny Park is a 46-acre (19 ha) park on the northeast shore of Lake Washington that is managed by the city of Kirkland, Washington but is owned by the city of Seattle. It has approximately 0.25 miles (400 m) of Lake Washington shoreline, and some park amenities such as BBQ grills and a covered structure at the shore, with mostly unimproved forest above the lake, surrounding Denny Creek.

== History ==
Named for Seattle founder Arthur A. Denny's son Orion Orvil Denny (1853–1916), the site of present-day O.O. Denny Park served as Orion Denny's country estate. Orion Denny and his wife called their estate "Klahanie", (Note: The word "Klahanie" is a Chinook Jargon term for "outside" or "the outdoors", also used by the neighborhood of Klahanie, Washington a few miles away.) which is Chinook Jargon for "out of doors." Following Orion's death in 1916, Denny's widow Helen willed Klahanie to the city of Seattle to become a public park named in memory of her husband.

The park opened to the public in 1922. In 1926, the park became a designated campsite for Seattle children. In 1954, the old Denny residence was torn down.

After 1968, Seattle turned management of the park over to King County. In 2002, management was taken over by the Finn Hill Park and Recreation District. The city of Kirkland began managing the park in 2013, following its annexation of the Finn Hill neighborhood. The park remains owned by the city of Seattle.

== Natural history ==
The park features an unusual quantity of trees over 150 feet (46 m) tall, including grand firs, black cottonwoods, western hemlock, and cedars. Many Douglas firs stand over 200 feet (61 m) tall, and are among the tallest trees in the Seattle area. One of the Douglas firs is "Sylvia", a 600-year-old specimen over 26 feet (7.9 m) in circumference, once the largest fir tree in King County; it was 255 feet (78 m) tall until the 1993 Inauguration Day windstorm topped it.

The park is one of four designated, protected bald eagle nesting areas in Kirkland, all on the Lake Washington shoreline.

O.O. Denny Park gallery
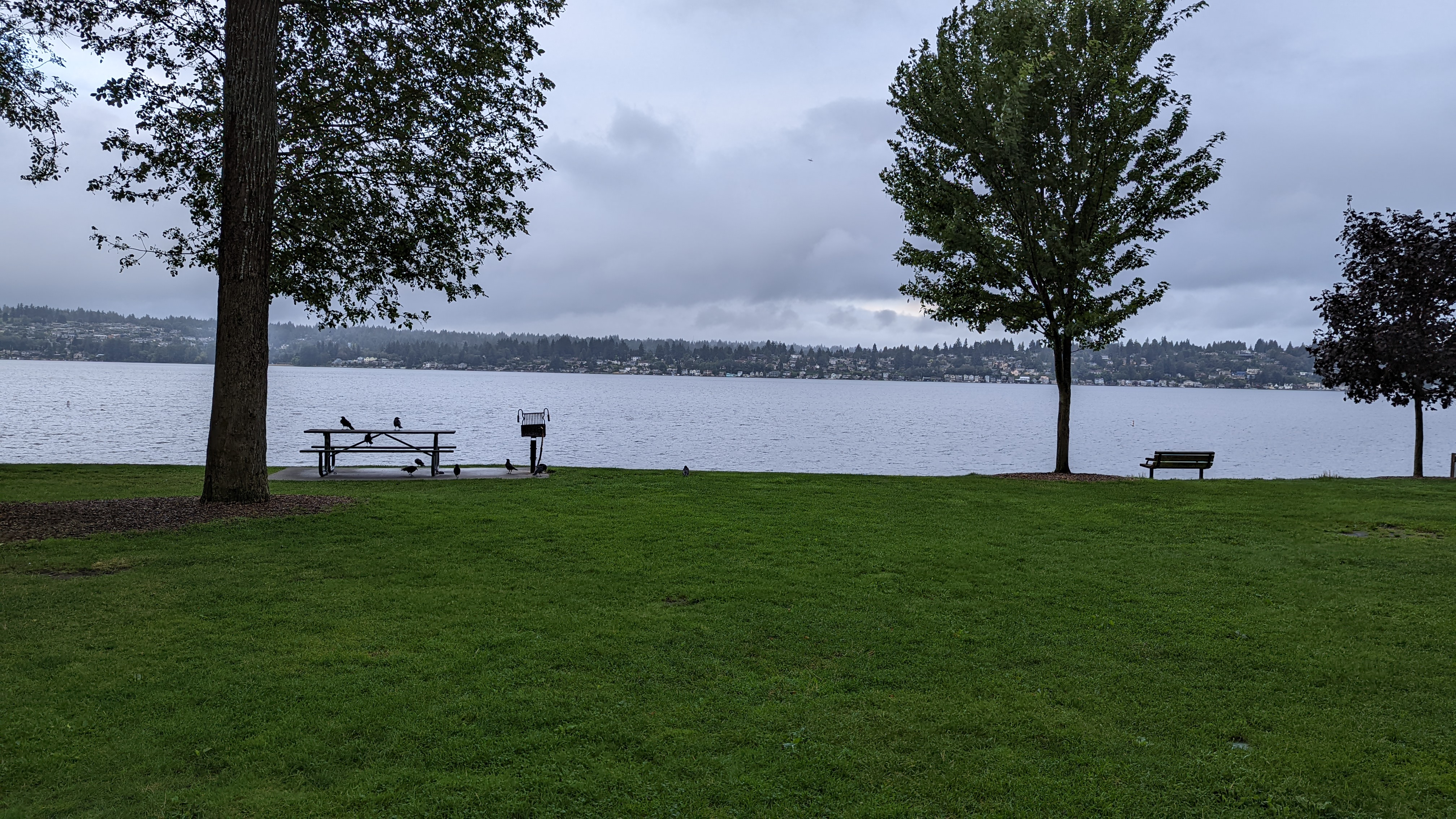
Lake Washington and north Seattle as seen from O.O. Denny Park

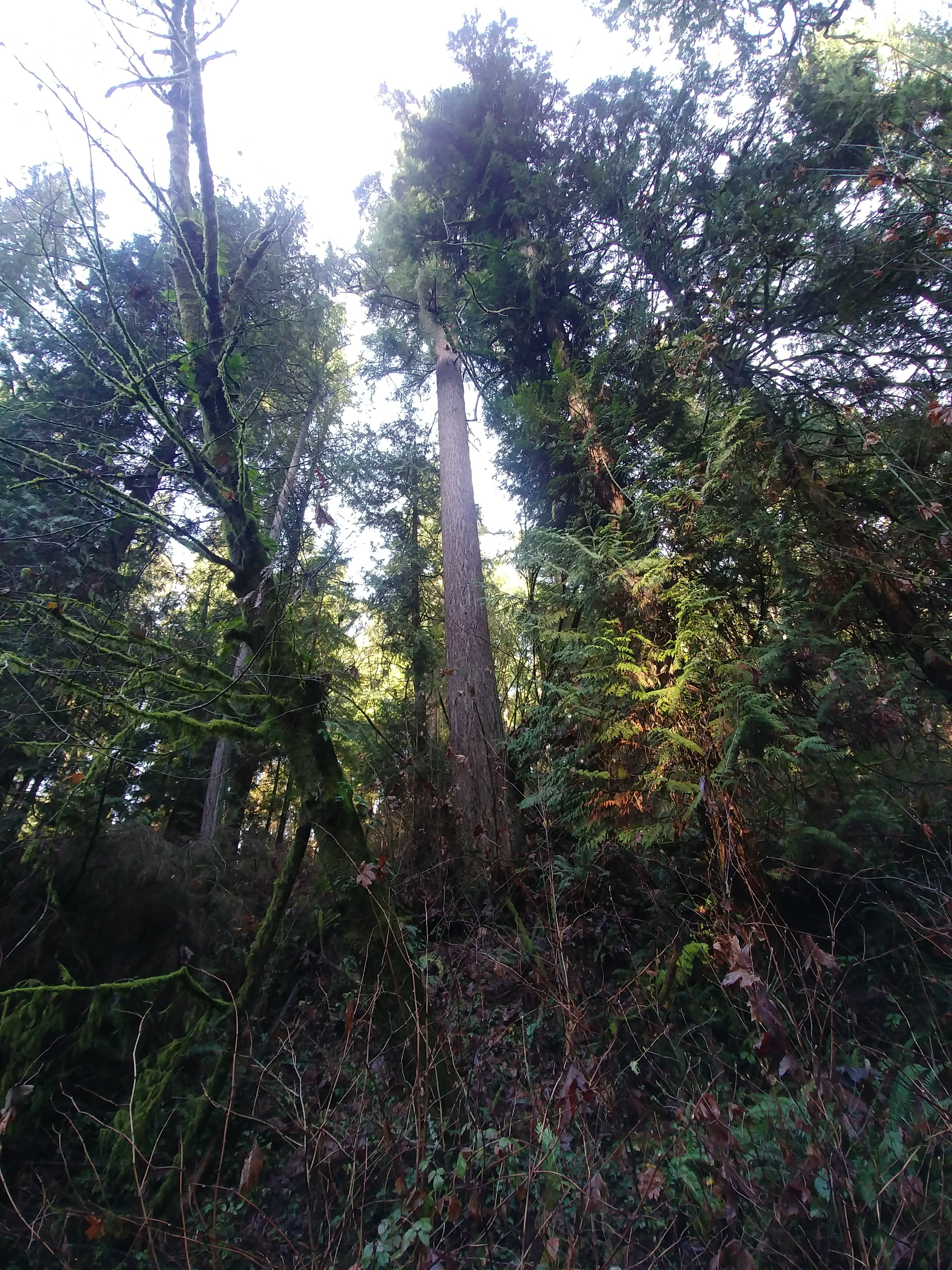
Lower Loop Trail

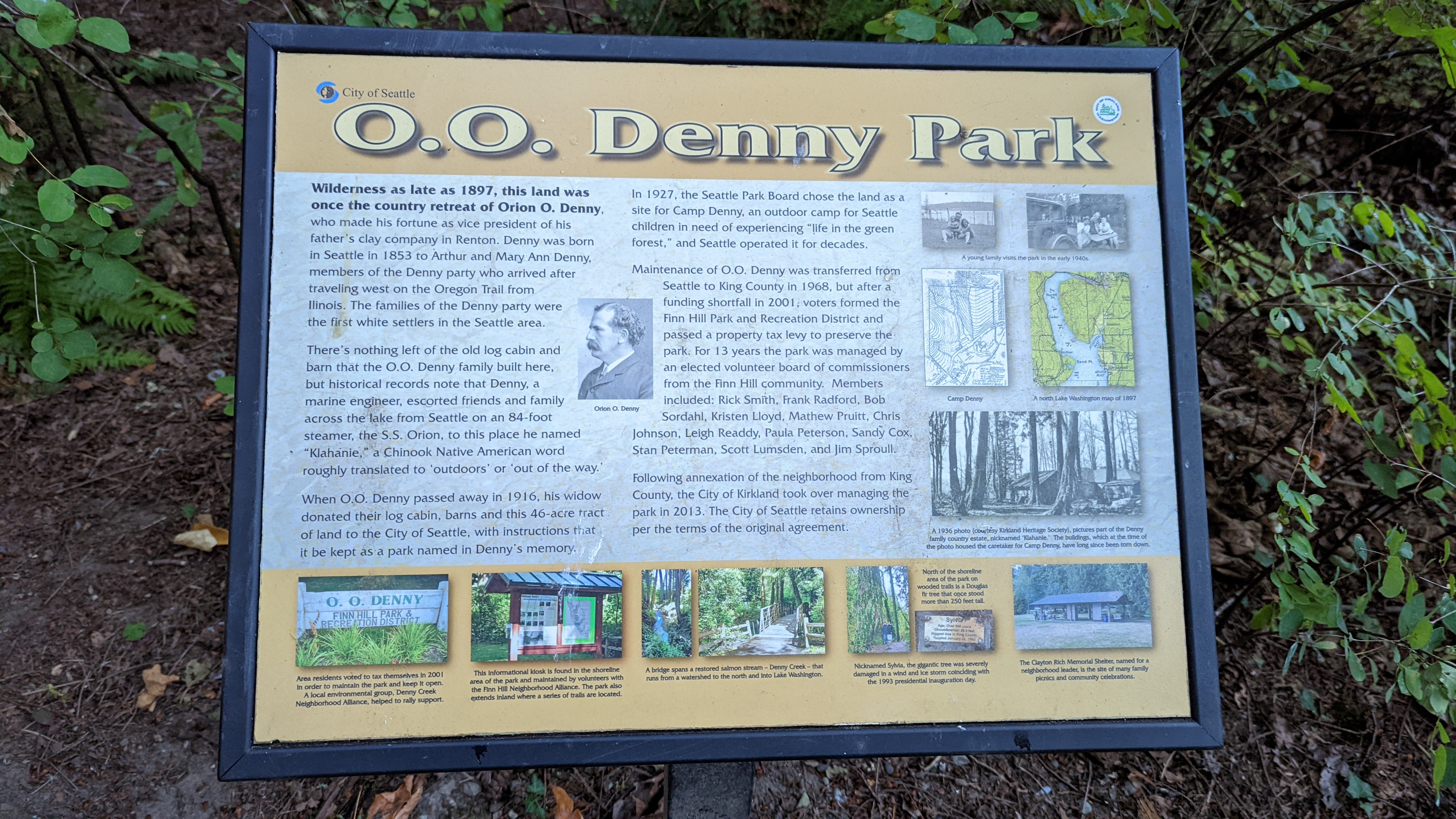
O.O. Denny Park history placard
