= Peter Kirk Building =

- U.S. National Register of Historic Places
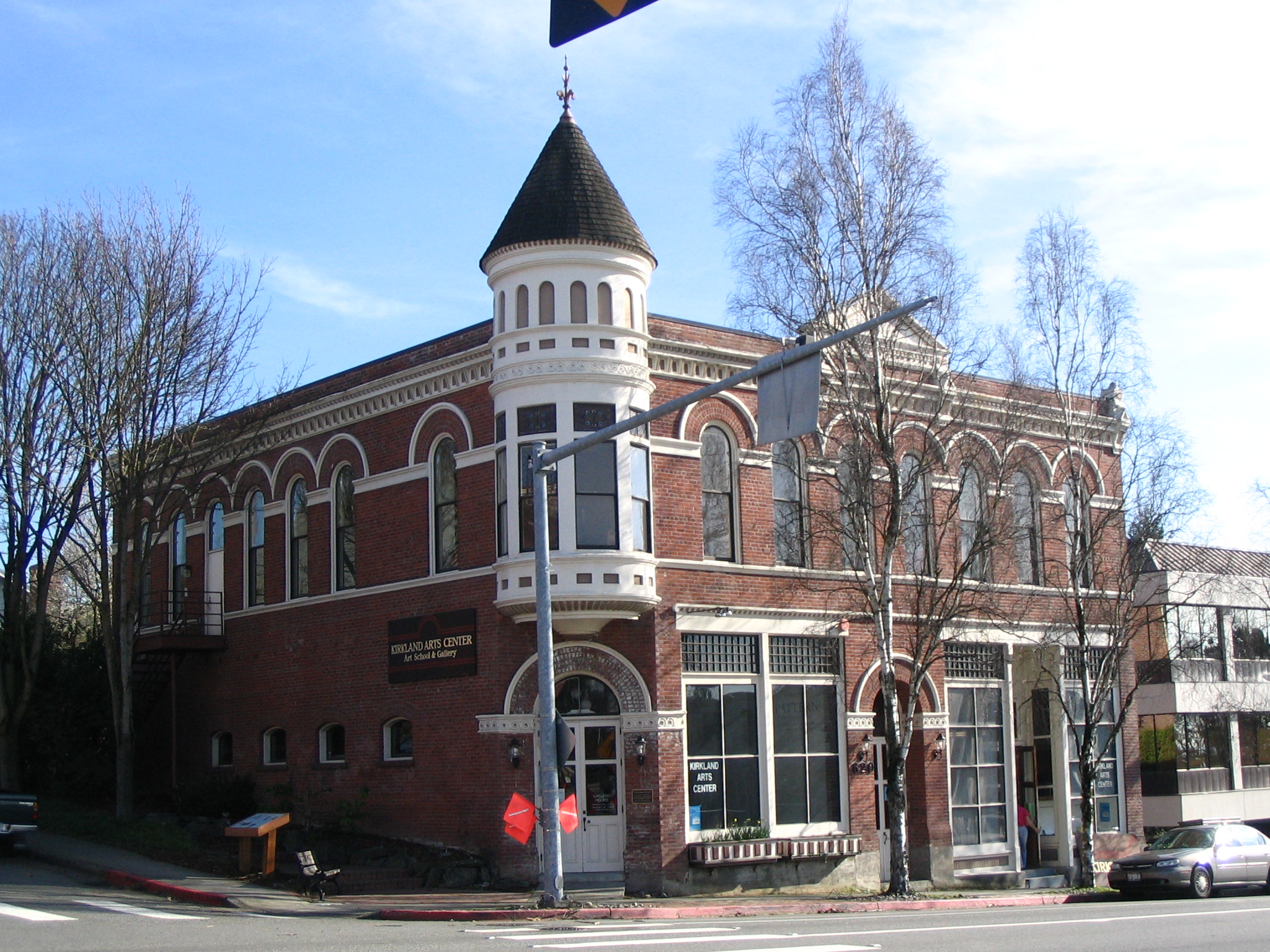
- Interactive map of Peter Kirk Building
- Location: Kirkland, Washington
- Coordinates: 47.68022°N 122.20939°W
- Built: 1889–90
- Architectural style: Victorian Romanesque
- NRHP reference No.: 73001873
- Added to NRHP: August 14, 1973

The Peter Kirk Building, first known as the Kirkland Investment Company Building, is a historic building in Kirkland, Washington located at the corner of Market Street and Seventh Avenue, Kirkland's historic commercial core. It is listed on the National Register of Historic Places. It was built in 1889 by the city's founder and namesake Peter Kirk, who constructed the building as the intended centerpiece of his planned steel producing mecca until those plans were dashed by multiple factors including the Panic of 1893. In the ensuing years, Kirkland's commercial core shifted to the south, likely sparing the building the fate of urban renewal or being altered beyond recognition. Due to its location on the East Side's main north-south arterial (WA 2-A, a.k.a. Lake Washington Boulevard) the building remained occupied on the ground floor but had fallen into serious disrepair by the mid-20th century. The building was rescued from demolition in the early 1960s by a syndicate led by William Radcliffe who purchased and restored the Peter Kirk Building into the Kirkland Arts Center which it remains to the current day. Today it is one of Kirkland's most historic and iconic landmarks.

The building is notable for its corner turret and Victorian and Romanesque designs which remain intact. It is constructed of locally pressed red brick with plaster, rusticated stone and tin trimmings. It is the oldest existing commercial building on the Eastside of Lake Washington.

== Present and original appearance ==
The Peter Kirk Building is generally late Victorian in character and the exterior, in spite of many owners and periods of neglect, appears now almost exactly the same as it did in the late 19th century. There have been some interior changes such as a stairway being moved and the addition of a fire escape in the rear and also the addition of a mezzanine. The land on which it sits is sloping. The building is basically square, measuring 59' × 55'. The roof is flat with a continuous parapet on the north and west faces (approximately 3 feet high). There is an isolated pediment rising above the roof line on the west face. There is a decorated entablature with dentils and stylized brackets; the entablature is metal. The building material is brick in stretcher bond pattern. It is two stories with no basement. Second story windows are tall semicircular with radiating voussoirs and continuous sills; they are all double hung sash, The western face on street level has store front windows, full length topped by 48 section "lights". The north face main level windows are squat segmented with radiating voussoirs and a surround with trim. The entrance is semi-circular w/radiating voussoirs and a surround with trim., The recessed doors are double with windows. There is a two section fan transom above the doors. The main entrance is topped on the second level by a turret with a candle snuffer roof. The turret has four double hung windows topped by leaded stained glass lights. There is a metal finial atop the turret roof.

== History ==
Ground was broken for the building in 1889 at the southeast corner of Market and Picadilly Street (now Seventh Avenue) in what was then Kirkland's main intersection and intended business district. The bricks were made by the Kirkland Brick Company, located where Peter Kirk Park is now, out of locally dug clay. After several delays in construction the building was completed in March 1890 at a cost of $8,000. Kirk located his offices for the Kirkland Investment Company on the upper floor; his own office in the corner turret. The first floor was initially occupied by the dry goods business of James Guptill and George Evans (Who were both having homes constructed on Waverly Way during the boom) and The Elder Drug store. Following the demise of Kirk's plans for the town as a steel producing mecca, the business center shifted away from the Kirk Building towards the waterfront and ferry dock. The upper floor was vacated when the Kirkland Investment Company was sold to Seattle Developers Burke & Farrar, who played a major role in revitalizing Kirkland as a suburban community in the early 1910s. In the 1920s Market Street was designated as part of state highway 2-A, making it the main north-to-south thoroughfare on the Eastside. The second floor of the Kirk Building was later converted to apartments while the ground floor continued to host businesses including a butcher shop, a grocery store and a furniture store. One of these was the Eastside Furniture Company, owned by Kirkland's youngest mayor, Al Leland, in the 1940s.

After years of neglect, the building was threatened with demolition in the late 1950s because the landlord couldn't afford to make the needed repairs. William Radcliffe, a local teacher, purchased space in the building's then vacant upper story in 1958 for an art studio. In 1961, he and a group of local investors, known as the Peter Kirk Syndicate, purchased the building to clean it up and perform needed repairs. Their intention was to "preserve the building as an historic structure and use the building for the cultural enrichment of the community." The members of the syndicate donated their shares of the building to form the Creative Arts League which moved into the building where it offered various art classes as well as operating a small theater.

On October 25, 1991, the organization's name was changed to the Kirkland Arts Center. KAC operates a non-profit visual arts school which includes ceramics, printmaking, painting, watercolor, and collage.

The Peter Kirk Building was listed on the National Register of Historic Places in 1973 and after receiving the federal tax credits, the building was given a full restoration in 1977.

In 2010, the Peter Kirk Building was nominated to compete for part of a $1 million grant from American Express as part of their Partners In Preservation Seattle-Puget Sound Initiative.

From 2021-2023, the Kirkland Arts Center received a Building for the Arts grant for a seismic retrofit and roof renovations.

== See also ==
- Peter Kirk
- Masonic Lodge Building
- Joshua Sears Building

== Bibliography ==
- National Register nomination form for the Peter Kirk Building" Kirkland Creative Arts League 26 April 1973. Retrieved January 10, 2010
- "THE PETER KIRK BUILDING - CENTER OF ACTIVITY" The Kirkland Arts Center. Retrieved December 31, 2009.
- Anon. "Town's houses offer a tour through time" The Seattle Times 21 July 2007. Retrieved December 31, 2009.
- "Kirkland Town of Brick Business Blocks 150 New Buildings" The News 1890. Retrieved December 31, 2009 [Kirkland Heritage Society]
- "Area's Oldest Building to be Restored (Headline only)" The Eastside Journal 11 January 1962. Retrieved December 31, 2009.
- Wood, Carrie "Editor's Note | Cast your vote to preserve piece of Kirkland history" The Kirkland Reporter 6 May 2010. Retrieved June 8, 2010.
