= Great Western Iron and Steel Company =

American company

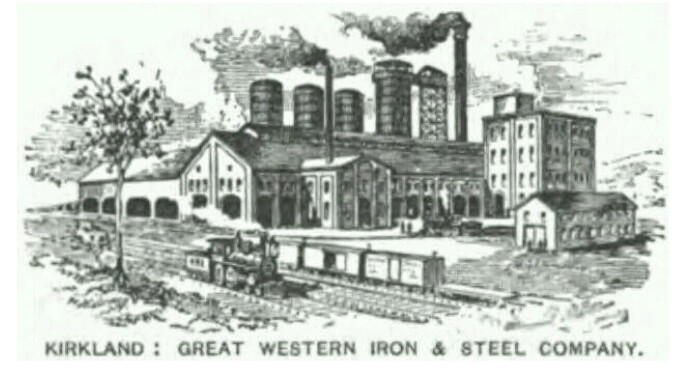
- Kirkland Steel Mill in 1892 King's Handbook of the United States (artist's depiction)
- Type: Private
- Industry: Iron and steel production
- Founded: Seattle, Washington, United States (August 18, 1888 Moss Bay America) or (June 1890 Great Western Iron and Steel)
- Founder: Peter Kirk, Arthur A. Denny, Leigh S. J. Hunt, et al.
- Defunct: June 19, 1895
- Headquarters: Kirkland, Washington Territory, United States
- Number of locations: Kirkland Steel Mill near Forbes Lake; 47.684°N 122.178°W

The Great Western Iron and Steel Company was a company founded in the 1890s in Kirkland, Washington Territory by the city's namesake Peter Kirk to build an integrated smelter and steel mill to refine local ore into steel for rails and other purposes. If the enterprise had proceeded as Kirk and other investors envisioned, it would have held a "practical monopoly of the entire Pacific Coast" steel production. But instead, the company went bankrupt in the Panic of 1893, and the mostly-completed mill never produced any steel. A scholar in 1962 called it "the last major effort of private capital to erect an integrated iron and steel mill on the West Coast".

== Rise and fall of Great Western Iron and Steel ==
Kirk was a steel industry veteran from England. He and his business partners (including Member of Parliament Charles James Valentine) owned the Moss Bay Hematite Iron Company, later renamed Moss Bay Hematite Iron and Steel Company Limited, at Mossbay in Workington, Cumberland.

In Washington Territory, iron ore had been discovered near Snoqualmie Pass by Seattle pioneer Arthur A. Denny and coalfields were being worked in the Issaquah Alps and elsewhere in the King County Cascades foothills, although metallurgical coal used on the West Coast in the 1880s was imported from Australia.

Kirk became aware of the mineral resources and local demand on a trip to the area in 1886, during which year his British company supplied rails for the construction of the Seattle, Lake Shore and Eastern Railway. By 1887 thousands of tons of rails were being shipped from Britain, and a newspaper reported Kirk's company would begin production in King County within two years. Tacoma newspapers reported in early May, 1888 that Northern Pacific Railway's land agent Paul Schulze had wooed the project to begin in Cle Elum, Washington, but in late May, the Seattle Post-Intelligencer reported it was going to be done "between Houghton and Juanita" (now neighborhoods of Kirkland, then independent towns, and Kirkland was yet to receive its name). By June 1888, news had spread to national newspapers and the city of Kirkland was being mentioned by name. In August, 1888, incorporation papers were filed for the Moss Bay Iron and Steel Company of America, with Denny, Kirk, and Leigh S. J. Hunt, publisher of the Seattle Post-Intelligencer, among the six trustees. The company acquired 120 acres of land at Forbes Lake, subsequently transferred to Great Western. Moss Bay Iron and Steel prepared for construction and placed orders for machines and materials, but ran short of funds by late 1889. In June 1890, a new company, Great Western Iron and Steel, was formed with $1 million in capital. Kirk, Hunt and Denny were retained as trustees from the original company, and several new trustees were brought in.

=== Construction of the Kirkland Steel Mill ===
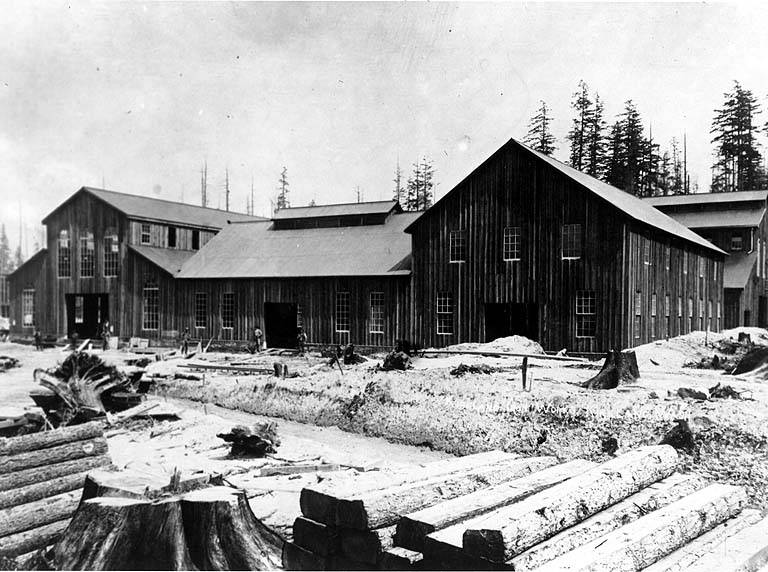
Steel works c. 1892

By mid 1890, clearing had begun around Forbes Lake. Kirkland was visited by President Benjamin Harrison to investigate possibility of a Lake Washington Ship Canal in 1890. He arrived on sidewheeler Kirkland and toured potential canal sites. The ship canal would have been used to deliver finished goods to Pacific markets in America and China; (Note: Sherrard (1958), p. 74–75 states: "There is every reason to believe that had the industrial activity on the east shore of Lake Washington continued after 1892 a Lake Washington Canal would have been built, enabling oceangoing steamships to enter Lake Washington.") the canal was actually built well after the start of the 20th century.

Construction continued through 1891–1892. An 1892 Tacoma Ledger article shows photographs of completed depot, coal bunker, and iron works buildings. An 1892 American steel industry directory noted that a foundry, machine and pattern shops, and ore bunkers had been completed but no coke stack; in 1894 the same directory repeated that the coke stack had not been built.

Steel plant — buildings and structures (from Sherrard 1962)
Structure	Dimensions	Notes
Sawmill		
Blast furnaces	Each furnace was 75 feet (23 m) high	Capacity of 1,500 tons of pig iron per week per furnace. Thousands of tons of firebrick for the furnaces were sent by ship from England.
Rolling mill	At least 320 feet (98 m) long	Sources are unclear if this was actually built
Foundry	160 by 92 feet (49 m × 28 m)	Contained a small blast furnace, capable of handling 30-ton castings
Machine shop	90 by 60 feet (27 m × 18 m)	Machinery and equipment was purchased in Glasgow, Scotland and shipped in the fall 1890 around Cape Horn, arriving on Puget Sound March 7, 1891.
Blacksmith shop	61 by 40 feet (19 m × 12 m)	
Pattern department	90 by 49 feet (27 m × 15 m)	
Engine houses for the blast furnaces	94 by 40 feet (29 m × 12 m) each (2x engines)	Engines 84 feet (26 m) long, the pistons 42 inches (1,100 mm) in diameter with a stroke of 6 feet (1.8 m). Hundreds of tons of machinery were sent from England.
Boilers (12x)	30 feet (9.1 m) long (each boiler)	
Cast house	160 by 34 feet (49 m × 10 m)	
Bunkers for ore and coal	360 by 42 feet (110 m × 13 m) and 34 feet (10 m) high	Thirty ore bents with 18,000 ton capacity, one half of the entire bunker complex, were already up by March 1891. Rail tracks were laid above and below the bunkers. Another trestle over ore and coal bins was planned behind the ore bunkers. There was to be another trestle over ore and coal bins.

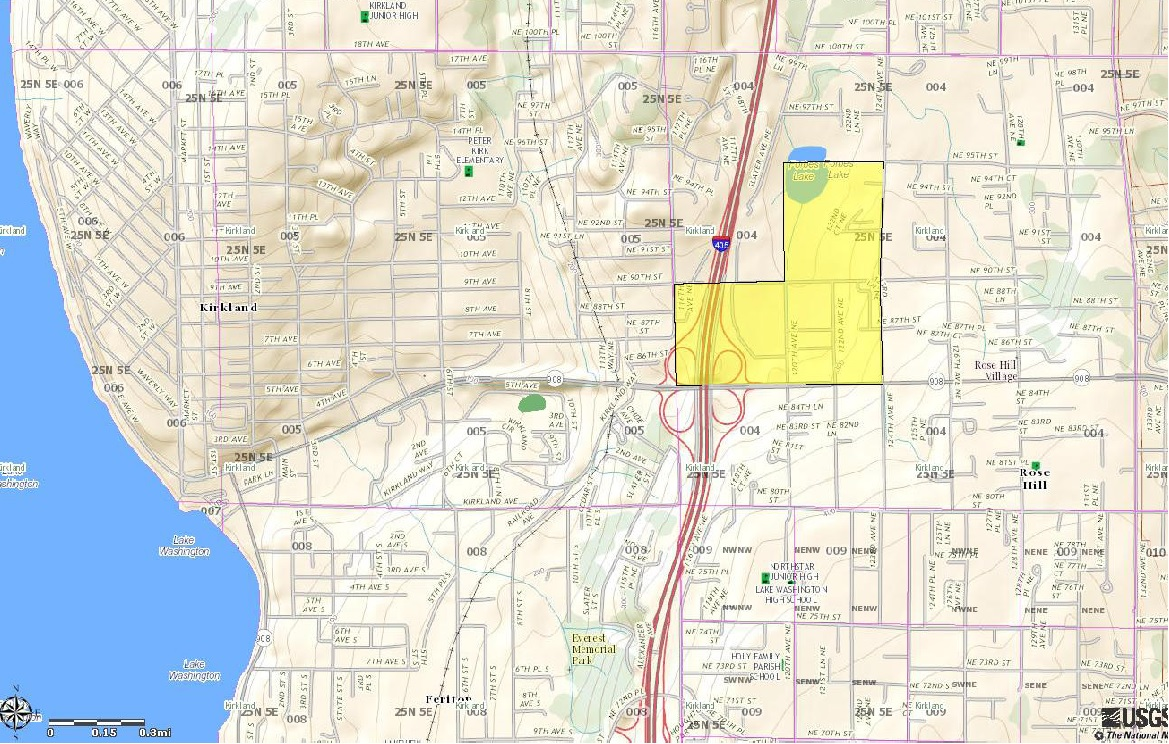
Locator map of the Kirkland Steel Mill property at Forbes Lake

From historical photographs and descriptions, the mill was built on the east side of Forbes Lake, between the lake and present-day 124th Avenue Northeast in Kirkland. (Note: Forbes Lake has been known by several names found in historical sources, including Little Lake, Lake Kirkland and Steel Works Lake. The official name is now Forbes Lake.) Historical society documents state that foundations and other remnants of the mill are reported to exist in the vicinity of the Kirkland Costco warehouse (or the nearby Rose Hill Presbyterian Church), but could not be found. The same location was noted in a Seattle Times article on Kirkland's centennial in 2005. The property owned by Great Western is shown in the map to the right, roughly bounded on the south by NE 85th Street, on the north by modern day Forbes Lake Park, on the west by 116th Avenue NE, and on the east by 124th Avenue NE.

=== Associated works ===
Other works associated with the mill included lakefront warehouses built in 1890 for equipment and raw materials to construct the mill, a sawmill producing approximately 3,000,000 board feet of lumber by early 1891, miles of water pipeline from Lake Washington and Forbes Lake, and a railroad depot at Piccadilly Street (today Slater and 7th Avenue/NE 87th Street) for the expected Northern Pacific Railway connection. (Note: Sweetser (1892): "The Northern Pacific Railroad [sic] is now being built to Kirkland and to the iron mines...")

=== Bust ===
Transportation issues with railroads, the delay in building the planned Lake Washington Ship Canal (in turn due to the Great Seattle Fire of 1889, after which the canal was derided by some as the "Kirkland ditch"), failure to completely analyze demand and properly lay the foundations for the business, and competition between Tacoma and Seattle, (Note: Stein (1998) states: "[T]he Seattle, Lake Shore & Eastern Railroad refused to bring a rail line down to the waterline. The Northern Pacific, based in Tacoma had just bought the railroad, and Tacoma was in direct competition with Seattle as the predominant seaport on Puget Sound. A rail spur to Kirkland would have helped Seattle, which was not in the railroad's best interest.") have all been listed as reasons why Great Western never began to produce steel. In any event, the Panic of 1893 resulted in investors defaulting on their stock subscriptions, resulting in insufficient liquidity for the company to complete construction and begin operations. A June, 1895 court judgment transferring all the company's assets to the land company from which all the steel mill property had been bought signaled the company's effective bankruptcy.

After bankruptcy, British-owned Durham Coal Mine (38% ownership by Balfour, Guthrie) coal-mining operations continued, but results were "far from satisfactory".

== Kirkland after Great Western Iron and Steel ==
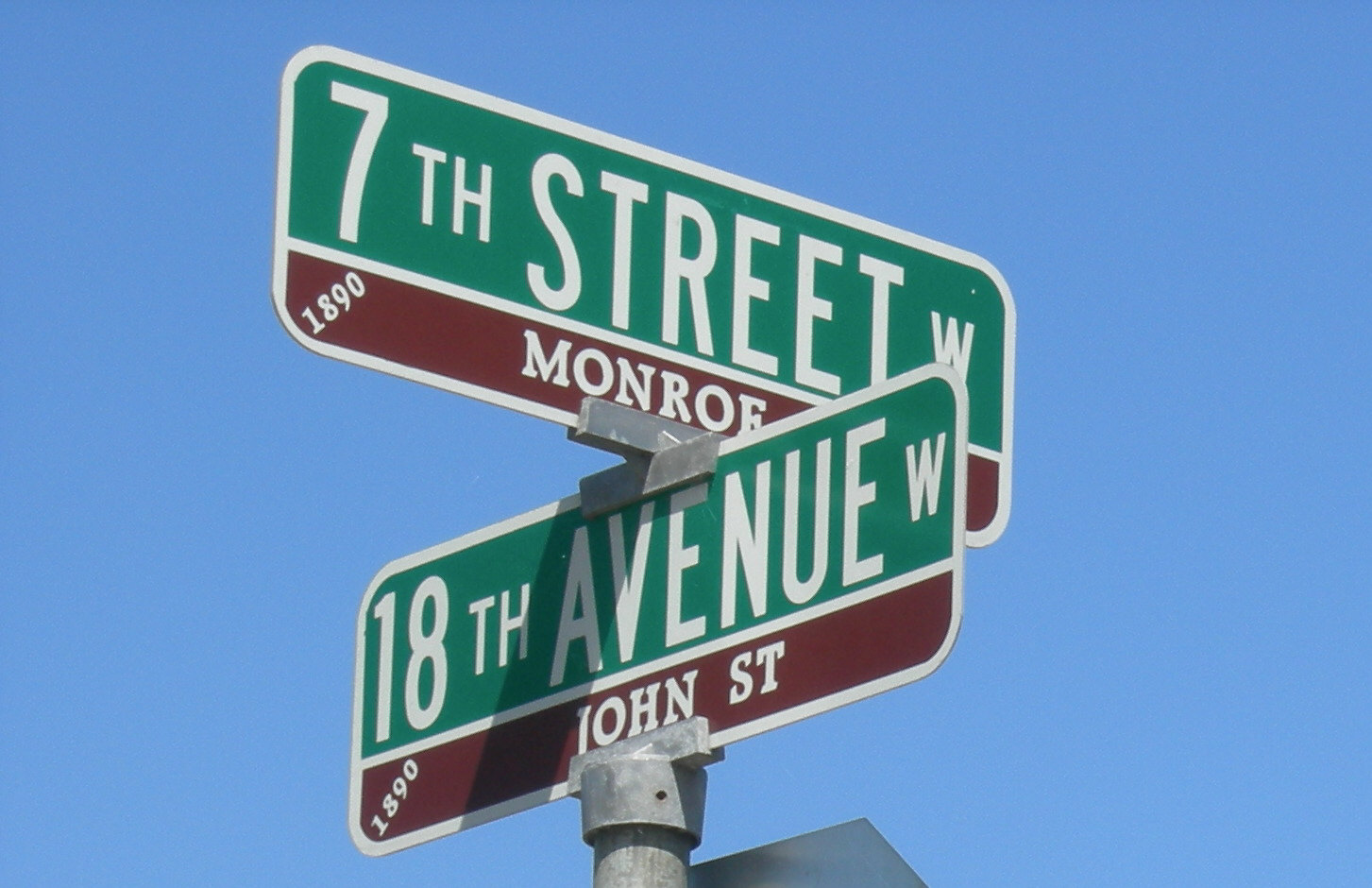
Kirkland street sign showing 19th century street names underneath modern names

Kirk and the others who came to King County to create a steel mill are regarded as founders of the City of Kirkland. Although the steel mill no longer stands, the city retains historic homes and commercial buildings associated with it, including Peter Kirk's own 1891 brick office building, the Peter Kirk Building, the oldest commercial building on the Eastside of Lake Washington. The downtown area's 1888 street grid and house lots remain those planned for the company town by the founders, with 20–30-foot (6.1–9.1 m) plots on the 1880 plan of the Pullman District in Pullman, Illinois, the first planned industrial community in America. The city's downtown area bears dual-named street signs, with both the modern names and the original names referring to 19th century American presidents (e.g. Monroe) and English culture and steel industry (e.g. Piccadilly, Victoria and Sheffield).

== Notes and references ==
=== Bibliography ===
- Directory of the Iron and Steel Works of the United States and Canada, American Iron and Steel Institute, 1892, p. 67
- Directory of the Iron and Steel Works of the United States and Canada, American Iron and Steel Institute, 1894, p. 66
- Peyton Whitely (August 6, 1998), "A Hidden Past -- Founder's Vision Unravels", The Seattle Times
- Baggley, Phil (c. 2005), Moss Bay Hematite Iron Company: A look at the early history of the Moss Bay Iron works
- Bagley, Clarence (1916), History of Seattle from the Earliest Settlement to the Present Time, Volume 2, Seattle: S.J. Clarke Publishing Company, p. 633
- Ely, Arline (1975a), Our Foundering Fathers (PDF), Kirkland Public Library
- Ely, Arline (1975b), Our Foundering Fathers - picture section (PDF), Kirkland Historical Society Un-numbered pictures section between page 64 and 65 of main citation.
- Falk, Nina Elizabeth; Kombol, William (November 1, 2006), Durham: A King County Coal Mining Town
- Grant, Frederic James (1891), "14: Growth of the Present/The Great Western Iron and Steel Works", History of Seattle, Washington: With Illustrations and Biographical Sketches of Some of Its Prominent Men and Pioneers, Seattle: American Publishing and Engraving, p. 314, ISBN 9780598280718
- Grindeland, Sherry (June 29, 2005), "A Walk Through History: Kirkland at 100", The Seattle Times
- Hawkinson, Loita (March 2010), Why Peter Kirk's steel mill failed to open in Kirkland (PDF), Kirkland Heritage Society
- Lange, Greg (October 3, 1999), Panic of 1893 sends King County and the Puget Sound region into a four-year depression on May 5, 1893, HistoryLink
- Sherrard, William R. (October 1962), "The Kirkland Steel Mill: Adventure in Western Enterprise", The Pacific Northwest Quarterly, 53 (4), University of Washington: 129–137, JSTOR 40487754
- Sherrard, William R. (1958), "The Kirkland Steel Mill", Master's Thesis (MBA), University of Washington
- Stein, Alan J. (October 25, 1998), Kirkland Thumbnail History, 208
- Stein, Alan J. (c. 2005), "Facts About Kirkland: Kirkland: Then and Now", Kirkland Centennial website, City of Kirkland, archived from the original on 2013-12-20
- Sweetser, Moses Foster (1892), King's handbook of the united states, Moses King Corporation, p. 874
- Whitely, Peyton (September 29, 1999), Kirkland Takes Stock Of Historic Landmarks -- Planning Board Will Study Inventory For Preservation, The Seattle Times
- Wilkins, Mira (1989), "British direct investment in coal, iron and steel in the American West...", The History of Foreign Investment in the United States to 1914 (Issue 41 of Harvard studies in business history), Harvard University Press, pp. 252–254, ISBN 9780674396661
- "Steel-making on the Pacific", Daily Inter Ocean, Chicago, p. 14, June 17, 1888 – via New York Times
- "To establish new iron works, a syndicate of English capitalists lease a mine in Washington Territory", Milwaukee Daily Journal, Milwaukee, June 2, 1888
- The Tacoma Ledger, Tacoma, Washington, October 31, 1892 – via Kirkland Heritage Society
- "3: Historic context", Highlands Neighborhood Plan Update (PDF), City of Kirkland Planning Commission, November 28, 2005, p. 4
