= Inglewood-Finn Hill, Washington =

- Neighborhood
- Location of Inglewood-Finn Hill, Washington
- Coordinates: 47°43′21″N 122°13′12″W
- Country: United States
- State: Washington
- County: King

Area
  - Total: 8.0 sq mi (20.6 km^{2})
  - Land: 5.8 sq mi (15.0 km^{2})
  - Water: 2.2 sq mi (5.7 km^{2})

Population (2010)
  - Total: 22,707
  - Density: 3,923/sq mi (1,514.5/km^{2})
- Time zone: UTC-8 (Pacific (PST))
  - Summer (DST): UTC-7 (PDT)
- FIPS code: 53-33380

Inglewood-Finn Hill was a census-designated place (CDP) in King County, Washington, United States. The population was 22,707 at the 2010 census. The community was largely annexed into neighboring Kirkland in 2011.

Based on per capita income, one of the more reliable measures of affluence, Inglewood-Finn Hill ranks 35th of 522 areas in the state of Washington to be ranked.

== History ==
Inglewood was platted and named in 1888 by the settler L.A. Wold. The community was largely annexed into neighboring Kirkland in 2011 and removed from the Census Bureau's list of places as part of the annual Boundary and Annexation Survey.

== Geography ==
Inglewood-Finn Hill is located at 47°43′21″N 122°13′12″W (47.722620, -122.219941) north of the pre-2011 Kirkland, Washington city limits and south of Kenmore. In December 2009, nearly all of the CDP was approved for annexation to Kirkland in a city council vote. Norway Hill, a small neighborhood in the northeastern part of the area, is part of a potential annexation area controlled by Bothell, Washington.

According to the United States Census Bureau, the CDP had a total area of 8.0 square miles (20.6 km^{2}), of which, 5.8 square miles (15.0 km^{2}) of it is land and 2.2 square miles (5.6 km^{2}) of it (27.39%) is water.

== Demographics ==
Historical population
Census	Pop.	Note	%±
1980	12,467		—
1990	29,132		133.7%
2000	22,661		−22.2%
2010	22,707		0.2%

As of the census of 2010, there were 22,707 people, 8,306 households, and 6,163 families residing in the CDP. The population density was 3,922.6 people per square mile (1,513.7/km^{2}). There were 8,553 housing units at an average density of 1,480.5/sq mi (571.3/km^{2}). The racial makeup of the CDP was 86.78% White, 1.39% African American, 0.48% Native American, 6.38% Asian, 0.19% Pacific Islander, 1.31% from other races, and 3.47% from two or more races. Hispanic or Latino of any race were 3.80% of the population.

There were 8,306 households, out of which 38.6% had children under the age of 18 living with them, 61.8% were married couples living together, 8.6% had a female householder with no husband present, and 25.8% were non-families. 17.7% of all households were made up of individuals, and 3.2% had someone living alone who was 65 years of age or older. The average household size was 2.71 and the average family size was 3.09.

In the CDP, the population was spread out, with 26.2% under the age of 18, 7.5% from 18 to 24, 34.6% from 25 to 44, 25.8% from 45 to 64, and 6.0% who were 65 years of age or older. The median age was 36 years. For every 100 females, there were 100.9 males. For every 100 females age 18 and over, there were 98.3 males.

The median income for a household in the CDP was $72,130, and the median income for a family was $77,393 (these figures had risen to $90,301 and $101,301 respectively as of a 2007 estimate). Males had a median income of $52,222 versus $35,765 for females. The per capita income for the CDP was $31,272. About 2.8% of families and 4.1% of the population were below the poverty line, including 5.1% of those under age 18 and 1.4% of those age 65 or over.
