= Peter Kirk (businessman) =

British-born American businessman (1840–1916)

- Born: 1840
- Died: 1916 (aged 75–76)
- Occupation: Businessman

Peter Kirk (15 February 1840 – 4 May 1916) was a British-born American businessman who founded the City of Kirkland in King County, Washington, United States. The town is named in his honor.

Kirk was born in Townend, Chapel-en-le-Frith, Derbyshire, England. He founded Kirkland initially as a steelworkers' town. Peter wanted Kirkland to become the "Pittsburgh of the West" through his Great Western Iron and Steel Company. He died during his sleep in Friday Harbor, Washington. He is buried outside Friday Harbor.
