= Lanc =

Lanc may refer to:

== Organizations ==
- National-Christian Defense League (Romanian: Liga Apărării Naţional Creştine), a Romanian political party
- National Liberation Movement (Albania) (Albanian: Lëvizja Antifashiste Nacional Çlirimtare or LANÇ), an Albanian World War II resistance organization

== People ==
- Arthur Lanc (1907–1995), Austrian medical officer during World War II who was named Righteous among the Nations for protecting Jews from the Holocaust
- Erwin Lanc (1930–2025), Austrian bank employee and politician, president of the International Handball Federation
- Maria Lanc (1911–1995), Arthur Lanc's wife, also named Righteous among the Nations

== Other uses ==
- Avro Lancaster, a British World War II heavy bomber aircraft nicknamed the Lanc
- LANC, a protocol by Sony used to synchronize camcorders and cameras

== See also ==
- Lancs (disambiguation)
- Lank (disambiguation)
