= RaLa Experiment =

Test to study nuclear shock waves

Flash X-Ray images of the converging shock waves formed during a test of the high explosive lens system.

The RaLa Experiment, or RaLa, was a series of tests during and after the Manhattan Project designed to study the behavior of converging shock waves to achieve the spherical implosion necessary for compression of the plutonium pit of the nuclear weapon. The experiment used significant amounts of a short-lived radioisotope lanthanum-140, a potent source of gamma radiation; the name RaLa is a contraction of "radioactive Lanthanum". The method was proposed by Robert Serber and developed by a team led by the Italian experimental physicist Bruno Rossi.

The tests were performed with 1/8 inch (3.2 mm) spheres of radioactive lanthanum, equal to about 100 curies (3.7 TBq) and later 1,000 Ci (37 TBq), located in the center of a simulated nuclear device. The explosive lenses were designed primarily using this series of tests. Some 254 tests were conducted between September 1944 and March 1962. In his history of the Los Alamos project, David Hawkins wrote: "RaLa became the most important single experiment affecting the final bomb design".

== Experimental setup ==
The experiment was suggested on 1 November 1943 by Robert Serber. The idea was to measure the spatial and temporal symmetry of explosive compression of a metal sphere. The test measured changes of absorption of gamma rays in the metal of the sphere as it underwent compression. The gamma ray source was located in the center of a metal sphere. The increase of thickness (of hollow shells) and density (of solid spheres) as the compression progressed was detected as a decrease of intensity of gamma rays outside of the sphere; the lower density explosives did not absorb gamma radiation enough to interfere with the experiment. The gamma rays had to be intense and of the right energy. Too low energy, and they would be fully absorbed in the surrounding metal; too high energy and the difference of attenuation during the implosion would be too low to be practical. The detectors had to provide high speed and large area; fast ionization chambers, then under development, were the only devices then available satisfying the requirements.

Lanthanum-140 was chosen because it emits gamma rays in the desired energy range (1.60 megaelectronvolts (MeV), with fraction of 0.49 MeV), and has very high specific activity, thus providing sufficient radiation intensity to produce usable signals from the ionization chambers. After a test, dispersed La-140 rapidly decays into stable cerium-140, reducing the radiation hazard for the operators after several half-lives. It was also potentially available in larger quantities because its parent nuclide barium-140 is an abundant fission product of uranium. As a consequence, lanthanum-140 samples contained traces of barium-140, caesium-140, and especially strontium-90, which still presents a radioactive contamination problem in the area of the tests. Lanthanum-140 has a specific activity of 5.57×10^{5} Ci/g (20.6 PBq/g); a 1,000 Ci (37 TBq) La-140 source therefore equals about 1.8 mg of lanthanum.

A radiolanthanum sample, precipitated in a tip of a small cone, followed by a plug, was lowered into the center of the metal sphere of the experimental assembly with a device resembling a fishing rod. The cone and the plug were mated to the metal center of the assembly, together forming a metal sphere. A section of the explosive lensing was then returned to its place above the sphere. Several, typically four, ionization chambers were located around the experimental setup. Immediately after the detonation they generated signals that were displayed on oscilloscopes in a blast-proof shelter or a mobile laboratory in a tank, 150 feet (46 m) away, and the oscilloscope traces recorded on cameras. A calibration measurement was performed before and after each test. The ionization chambers and their preamplifiers were destroyed during the explosion, but their simple design allowed their production in sufficient quantities.

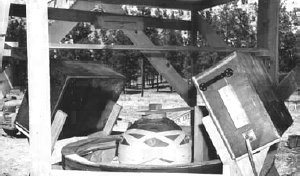
Experimental setup for RaLa shot 78 on May 13, 1947, at Bayo Canyon. Each rectangular box contains eight cylindrical fast ionization chambers.

The ionization chambers were cylindrical, 2 inches (51 mm) in diameter, 30 inches (760 mm) long, with a wire along the longitudinal axis. They were filled with a mixture of argon and carbon dioxide at 4.5 standard atmospheres (460 kPa). Eight chambers were arranged in a tray and connected in parallel; four trays were located in a tetrahedron around the experimental assembly, recording the gamma radiation around the sphere, sufficiently close to give a signal and sufficiently far away to not be destroyed by the blast before they could record the required information. The initiation of the explosives was initially performed by a multipoint Primacord system. The results were erratic, as the detonations weren't sufficiently synchronized. Much better results were obtained after February 1945, when exploding-bridgewire detonators, developed by Luis Alvarez's G-7 group, became available.

As plutonium was not available, it was substituted with material with similar mechanical properties. Depleted uranium was used but was not optimal because of its opacity for radiation; iron, copper, or cadmium were other choices. Cadmium was the choice for most of the tests. The first shot was performed with an iron mockup of the plutonium pit.

The resulting signal was a fast dip, corresponding to the compression of the cadmium sphere, followed by slower increase, corresponding to the decompression and following dispersal of the sphere and the lanthanum. The differences between the four traces on the oscilloscope display, each indicating the average compression in the direction of the detector, allowed the assessment of the required synchronization accuracy for the detonators.

The RaLa sources were highly radioactive. They had to be lowered to the test apparatus by a 10-foot (3 m) long rod. The tests were initially observed from a sealed M4 Sherman tank; the mobile laboratory consisted of two tanks. Each experiment was expected to contaminate an area of about 32,000 square feet (3,000 m^{2}) for about half a year. When radiobarium was removed from the radiolanthanum, the short-term contamination levels turned out to be insignificant. Tanks were then replaced with fixed shelters. One of the tanks was later lead-plated, sealed, equipped with self-contained air supply, and used for sampling of fission products in the post-blast debris after the Trinity test. The sources posed a considerable radiation exposure risk; the exposure rate of a 1,000 Ci (37 TBq) source at 3 feet (1 m) was 1,130 R/h and 11,000 R/h at 1 foot (0.30 m). Sources with activities up to 2,300 Ci (85 TBq) were used in some tests.

== Radiation safety ==
The system for remote handling of the samples had flaws; it took about six months to discover them all. The chemists, who operated on mixtures of fission products with batches reaching up to 2,300 Ci (85 TBq) each, were frequently exposed (accidentally) to undesirably high doses of radiation. The group handling the experiments themselves was less at risk; they operated in close coordination with the Health Group, who was in charge of ensuring that radiation exposure of the people involved was survivable. The radioactive contamination posed a problem. The people working in the Bayo Canyon had to change their clothes and take showers after the work. Sometimes they would still trip detectors at security gates.

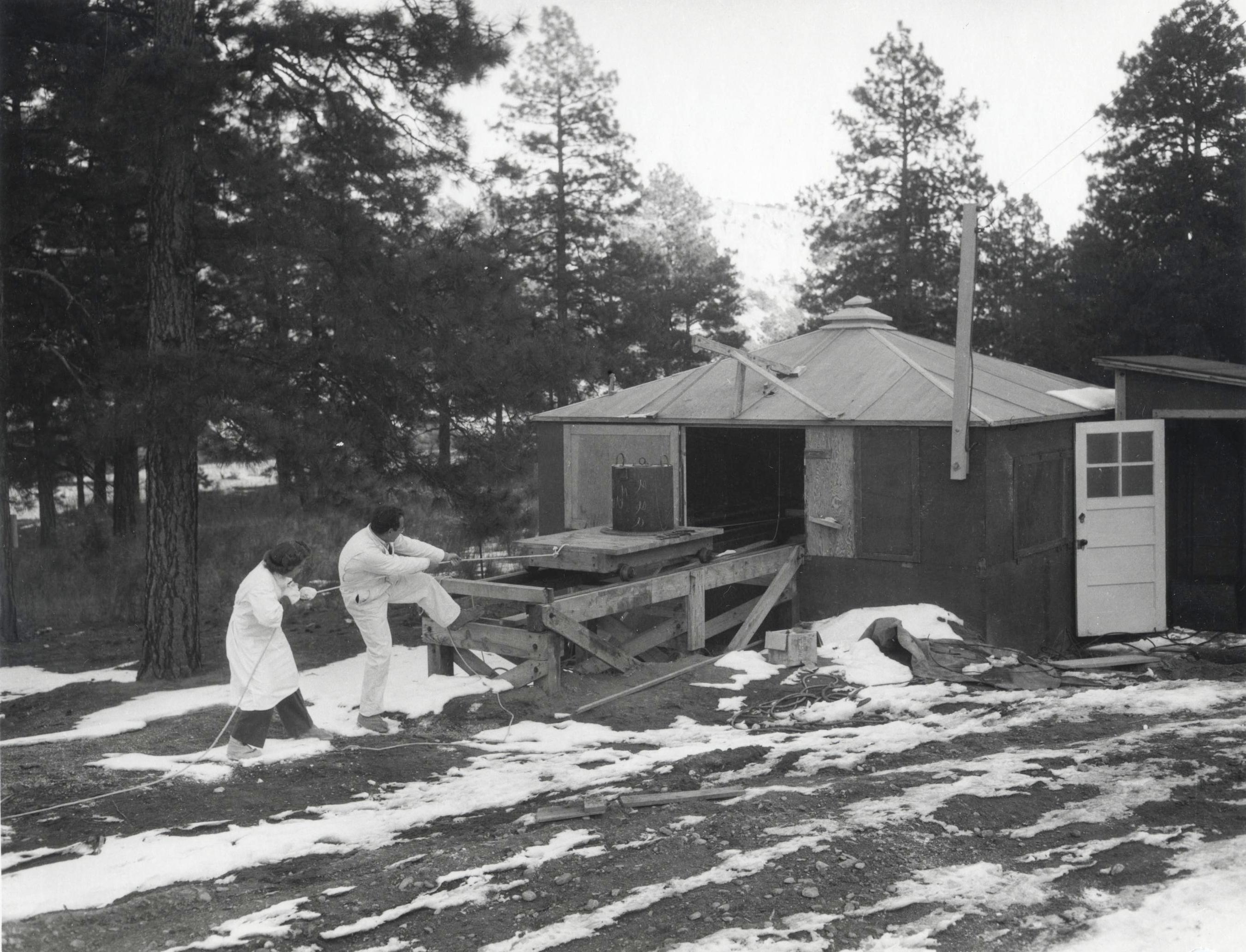
Remote handling of a 1,000 Ci (37 TBq) (1.8 mg) radiolanthanum source for a RaLa Experiment at Los Alamos

The experiments were performed in the Bayo Canyon in a location designated TA-10 ("Technical Area 10") (but more commonly referred to as the Bayo Canyon Site) in Los Alamos County and close to the border with Santa Fe County, northeast from the Los Alamos townsite. The site had several fixed structures. The lanthanum-140 was isolated in a radiochemistry building, TA-10-1. There were four firing sites. The instruments for firing the explosives and recording the data were housed in two detonation control buildings (TA-10-13 and TA-10-15).

Large amounts of radioactive lanthanum were dispersed by the outdoor explosions; 254 tests were performed between 1944 and 1961. In 1948 two workers received radiation burns there. The experiments were generally performed when the wind blew to the north, but occasionally the wind would change direction in the early morning. In 1949 and 1950 the nuclear fallout from the tests was blown over parts of the housing area and a road; the radiation levels on the road occasionally reached 5-10 mR/h and the road had to be closed for a while.

Each test released a plume of dispersed radioactive lanthanum. Three tests in 1950 are documented where the released radioactivity was tracked by a B-17 aircraft. In one case radiation was detected over a town 17 miles (27 km) downwind. These tests were concurrent with the RaLa tests, and their aim was development of airborne detectors for tracking air burst nuclear tests. The size and altitude of the radioactive cloud was determined by the quantity of the explosive used. For the first 125 tests between 1944 and 1949, meteorology and fallout monitoring were rare, but between 1950 and 1954 closer monitoring was phased in, and was comprehensive afterwards. One cloud was reportedly tracked as far as 70 miles (110 km) downwind, over Watrous, New Mexico.

== Logistics and schedule ==
To handle the logistics of the tests, Luis Alvarez was appointed by Robert Oppenheimer, the director of the Los Alamos laboratory, as the head of the RaLa program; his group was designated E-7, RaLa and Electric Detonators Group. Bruno Rossi and Swiss physicist Hans Staub built the ionization chambers and electronics by late spring. At first the work proceeded at a leisurely pace as the implosion was only a backup project; it was believed that the plutonium bomb would be of the Thin Man gun-type fission weapon design. This turned out not to be the case, as the first tests on reactor-produced plutonium in early summer 1944 showed unacceptably high spontaneous fission rates due to the presence of plutonium-240, precluding the use of gun assembly. On 17 July the Thin Man design was abandoned, and all effort was focused on implosion. To meet the challenge, the Los Alamos Laboratory was reorganized—the X-Division (Explosive Division) and the G-Division (Gadget Division, or Weapon Physics Division) were formed. Rossi's group was assigned to G-Division as G-6, or RaLa Group; Alvarez's group was G-7, or Electric Detonator Group.

On 25 July 1944 the first preliminary test was fired in the Bayo Canyon as a rehearsal, test of equipment, and measurement of collapse times and detonation and shock wave velocities. The program was delayed by about a month by late radiobarium shipments, as the test scheduled for 15 August was not conducted until mid-September. The first test with radiobarium was fired on 22 September. In late August and at the request of Rossi's group, the RaLa group was reformed under the leadership of Rossi, and Alvarez and his group took over the exploding bridgewire detonator research. At the suggestion of Robert Christy solid spheres instead of the originally intended hollow ones were chosen for the pit, in order to reduce the problems with jets and spalling. The first solid-sphere RaLa shot was performed in early December but the results were inconclusive. The shot from 14 December though, showed (in the words of Robert Bacher) "definite evidence of compression".

The first tests using electric detonators and solid pits were performed on 7 and 14 February 1945; until then primacord-based initiation was employed. The electric detonators showed a significant improvement in the achieved compression degree and symmetry, and were used on all RaLa tests thereafter. Based on these results, by the end of February the design of the Gadget, as the bomb was euphemistically known, was settled. Other test methods were also necessary, as the RaLa experiments provided only indirect indications about the formation of problematic jets that plagued the early implosion designs, but RaLa was the most important.

== Radiolanthanum preparation ==
=== Barium-lanthanum preparation ===
The half-life of La-140 is 40.224 hours; it undergoes beta decay to stable cerium-140. It was prepared from barium-140, a common fission product isolated from the spent fuel from the Oak Ridge National Laboratory X-10 Graphite Reactor, and later, after 1948, also from the Hanford Site plutonium-239 producing nuclear reactors. Barium was isolated in a purpose-built hot laboratory in Oak Ridge and shipped in a lead pig to Los Alamos, where it was used to extract lanthanum. The Oak Ridge laboratory was the first laboratory where remote manipulators were used for work with radioactive materials. The delivery was performed by a truck with a two-person crew, driving 1,500 miles (2,400 km) nonstop.

At Oak Ridge, uranium slugs were irradiated for 40 days, then left to cool down for 1 to 5 days, then dissolved. Barium then was extracted and the solution evaporated; the solid material was then shipped to Los Alamos. As of 1949, full production runs involved up to 1728 slugs (34.5 batches of 50 slugs). Until 1949 the Oak Ridge production site processed uranium slugs irradiated both on-site and at Hanford; afterward only Hanford material was processed.

At first the barium isolation was performed in building 3026-C (706-C), where an existing laboratory was converted for this purpose in 5 months; the first run was finished in September 1944. The 3026-C was designed for work with sources between 1 and 10 Ci (37 and 370 GBq), but conditions forced it to be adapted to work with 100 Ci (3.7 TBq) sources. Its capacity was insufficient as demand grew. In May 1945 a dedicated building 3026-D (706-D), adjacent to 3026-C and designed to process sources up to 1000 Ci, was completed. The first run in 3026-D was on 26 May 1945, the same day as the last run in the 3026-C facility.

By March 1949, 31 shipments averaging over 2000 Ci each were produced there for Los Alamos. Demand continued to grow though; by July 1950 the production goal per shipment was 10,000 Ci (370 TBq), and by the early 1950s the requirements went up to 50,000 Ci (1,800 TBq). By 1954 the shipments went up to 64,805 Ci (2.3978 PBq), and that year the AEC decided to build a new facility in Idaho National Laboratory for RaLa production. In October 1956, Oak Ridge completed their 68th and last RaLa run. In total, Oak Ridge processed over 30,000 uranium slugs and shipped over 500,000 Ci (19 PBq) to Los Alamos.

During preparation of RaLa volatile fission products were released. When dissolved, a batch of 50 slugs produced 2,500 Ci (93 TBq) of xenon-133, 1,300 Ci (48 TBq) of iodine-131 (high amounts, as the fuel had to be processed "fresh"), and a small amount of krypton-85. As few precautions were used for limiting the fission product releases, the RaLa production was a major contributor to radioactive contamination at Oak Ridge. The iodine emissions were an important factor in the decision to move the facility to Idaho. Later improvements allowed a reduction of iodine emissions to levels about 100 times lower.

A serious accident with radioactivity release occurred in the 3026-D facility at about 5 pm on 29 April 1954. After the dissolution of the third batch of uranium slugs, the liquid in the dissolver tank did not completely cover the slugs for about 29 hours, which overheated due to decay heat. When the acid was added for the fourth batch, the violent reaction with the hot metal produced gases and forced the solution up the slug loading chute and the pipes. The building staff donned their gas masks and evacuated the building. Radiation levels on the third floor of the building reached 100 roentgen per hour (R/h), and were reduced to 100 mR/h by 7 am the next day. The highest exposure to a person was 1.25 R of hard radiation and 4.7 roentgen equivalent physical of soft radiation.

=== Lanthanum preparation ===
After delivery of the barium-lanthanum material to Los Alamos, it was stored in a dedicated building in the Bayo Canyon Site. At first, the mixture was used as-is, both barium and lanthanum together, but this led to unpleasant radioactive contamination that took a long time to disappear as the half-life of barium-140 is 12.5 days. Shortly after, the process was improved; barium was removed chemically, by double precipitation from a solution as barium sulfate.

The process was improved again, to allow repeated separation of lanthanum from the barium solution, as the lanthanum built up. Initially, a phosphate process was used, where lanthanum was precipitated as lanthanum phosphate. This was later abandoned when an oxalate or hydroxide method was developed; lanthanum was precipitated as lanthanum hydroxide and then converted to a filterable precipitate by addition of oxalate with a trace of fluoride. The oxalate method had to be performed quickly, as the oxalate ion was susceptible to radiolysis and the lanthanum had the tendency to go back into solution. The oxalate process could be performed by remotely operated devices. The batches contained about 100 curies (3,700 GBq) of radiolanthanum, the highest radiation levels people had ever worked with at that time. Special tools had to be developed for remote handling of the hot materials. Lead bricks were used for shielding the sources. The radiation dose limit for the personnel was set to 500 mrem (5 mSv) per source preparation. Sometimes this limit was exceeded; once the received dose was 2 rem (20 mSv).

The improved process that separated lanthanum from the barium chloride solution had the advantage that barium could be "milked" repeatedly, increasing radiolanthanum yield and allowing more experiments. The problems of radioactive contamination with barium-140, with its half-life of 12.5 days, were eliminated; the amount of contaminating strontium-90 was also significantly reduced. Use of purified lanthanum also allowed usage of a much smaller amount of material in the tests themselves. Semiautomatic equipment for "lanthanum milking" (the barium-140 isotope was nicknamed a "cow") was built in a sufficiently distant area, which avoided time-consuming construction of a heavily shielded building. Early on, the process hit a snag when impurities of iron and other metals, probably introduced from an irradiated shipping container, were found to impair the lanthanum phosphate precipitation by forming phosphate gels that clogged filters. This problem was solved with better shipping containers. A similar "milking" process is now used for preparation of technetium-99m, used in nuclear medicine, from a molybdenum-99 "cow" in technetium-99m generators.

The separation process was performed in a dedicated facility in the Bayo Canyon, in the radiochemistry building, designated TA-10-1. The separated lanthanum was then shipped to the test site in a lead cask on the back of a truck. In 1951, the separation work was moved to TA-35. The tests were performed in a month-long series, as the barium source decayed and was periodically "milked" for lanthanum.

== Post-war progress ==
The technology was improved, and by 1951 the four ionization chambers were replaced by twenty scintillation counters, each using five gallons of a liquid scintillator. The flashes from 100 US gallons (380 L; 83 imp gal) of burning scintillator were remarkably brilliant in the early morning times when the tests were usually performed. RaLa tests continued until 1962, after which they were replaced by more advanced methods. Currently several other methods are used for hydrodynamic testing.

== Long-term contamination ==
Lanthanum-140 has a short half-life of some 41 hours, and is not a threat after a fairly short time. Other radioisotopes, present as impurities, have a long enough half-life to present a potential problem even decades after the tests; in 2002 the Los Alamos National Laboratory issued a warning to the Los Alamos county and the Forest Service performing thinning of trees in the area to not remove the trees cut in various parts of the Bayo Canyon due to possible content of residual radioactive materials. The worst affected zones are fenced off; detectable levels of radioisotopes are present in the soil, insects, and trees in the surrounding areas. The neighboring population was not informed about the tests until the mid-1990s, and Los Alamos refused to declassify the documentation.
