= Lancs =

Lancs may refer to:

- Lancashire, an English county
- Lancs Industries, a manufacturer of safety equipment
- Duke of Lancaster's Regiment, an infantry regiment of the British Army

== See also ==
- Lanc (disambiguation)
