= Lank =

Lank may refer to:

- Lank (surname)
- Lank, Cornwall, a hamlet in Cornwall, United Kingdom
- Lank Rigg, fell in the English Lake District

== See also ==
- Lanc (disambiguation)
