= Demron =

Non-toxic and flexible polymer radiation-shielding fabric

Demron is a radiation-shielding fabric. For the same weight it has slightly lower radiation protection than lead shielding, but is flexible. The composition of Demron is proprietary information, but it has been described as a non-toxic polyethylene and non-PVC-based polymer fused between two layers of a woven fabric. The polymer molecule imitates the electronic traits of heavy metals, commonly employed for shielding against radiation. It has a significant electron cloud that either deflects or absorbs incoming radiation. It is roughly three to four times more expensive than a conventional lead apron, but can be treated like a normal fabric for cleaning, storage and disposal. More recent uses for Demron include certified first responder hazmat suits as well as tactical vests.

== See also ==
- Nuclear safety
