= Hazmat suit =

Protective suit against chemical, bacteriological, and nuclear risks

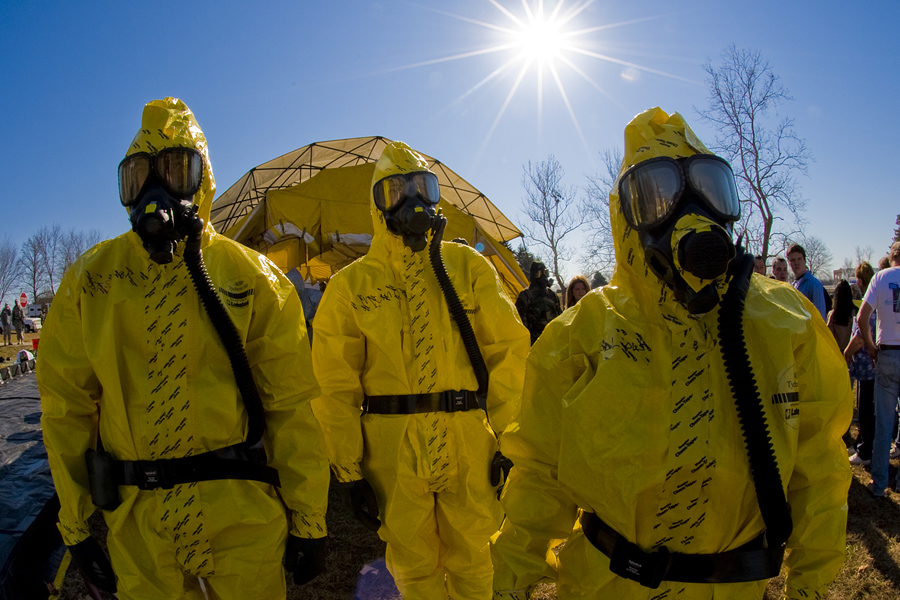
Decontamination personnel wearing hazmat suits during a mock nuclear attack in 2009.

A hazmat suit is a piece of personal protective equipment that consists of an impermeable whole-body or one piece garment worn as protection against hazardous materials.

Such suits are often combined with self-contained breathing apparatus (SCBA) to ensure a supply of breathable air. Hazmat suits are used by firefighters, emergency medical technicians, paramedics, researchers, personnel responding to toxic spills, specialists cleaning up contaminated facilities, and workers in toxic environments.

== History ==
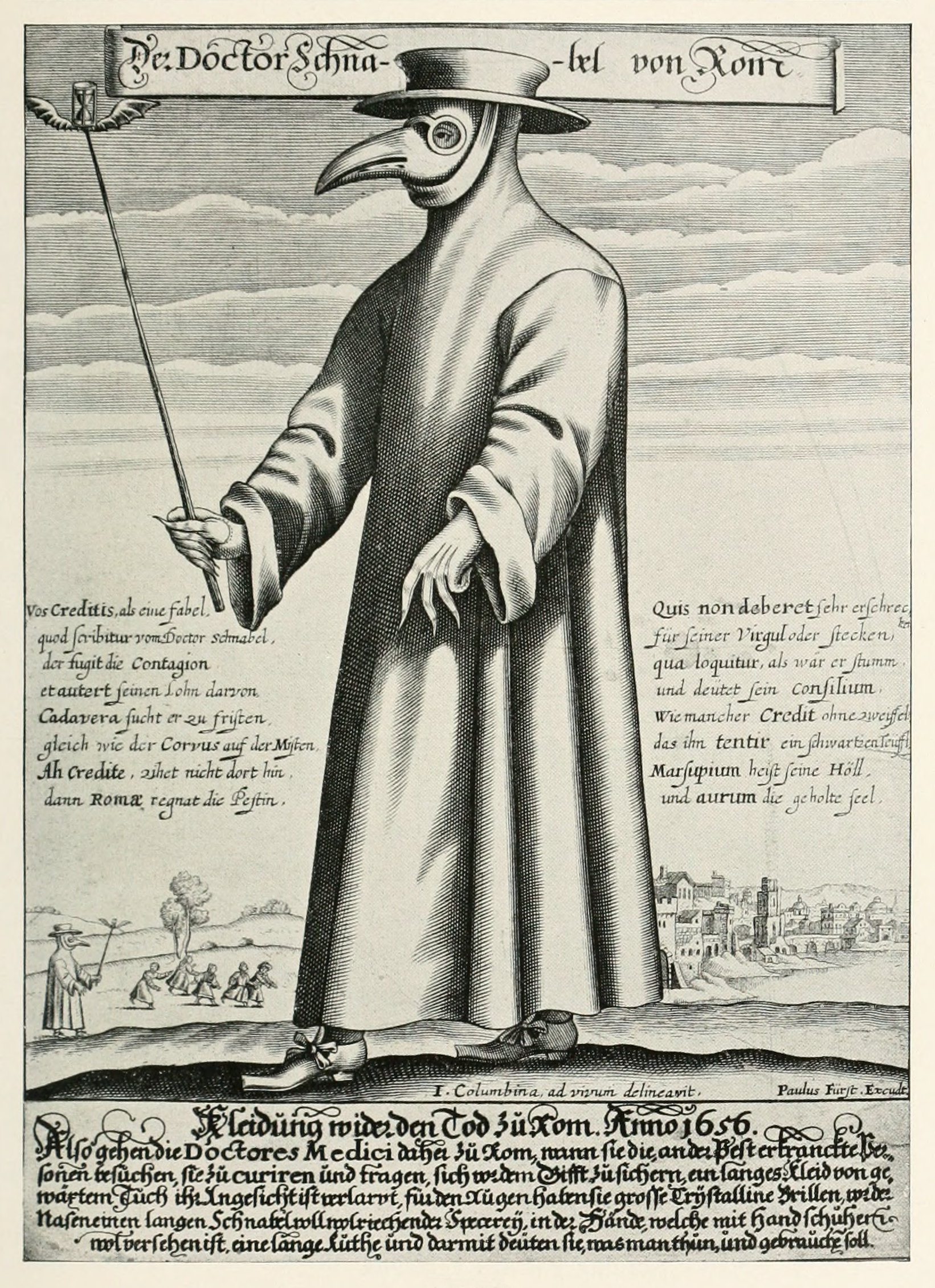
Plague doctor wearing a plague doctor costume

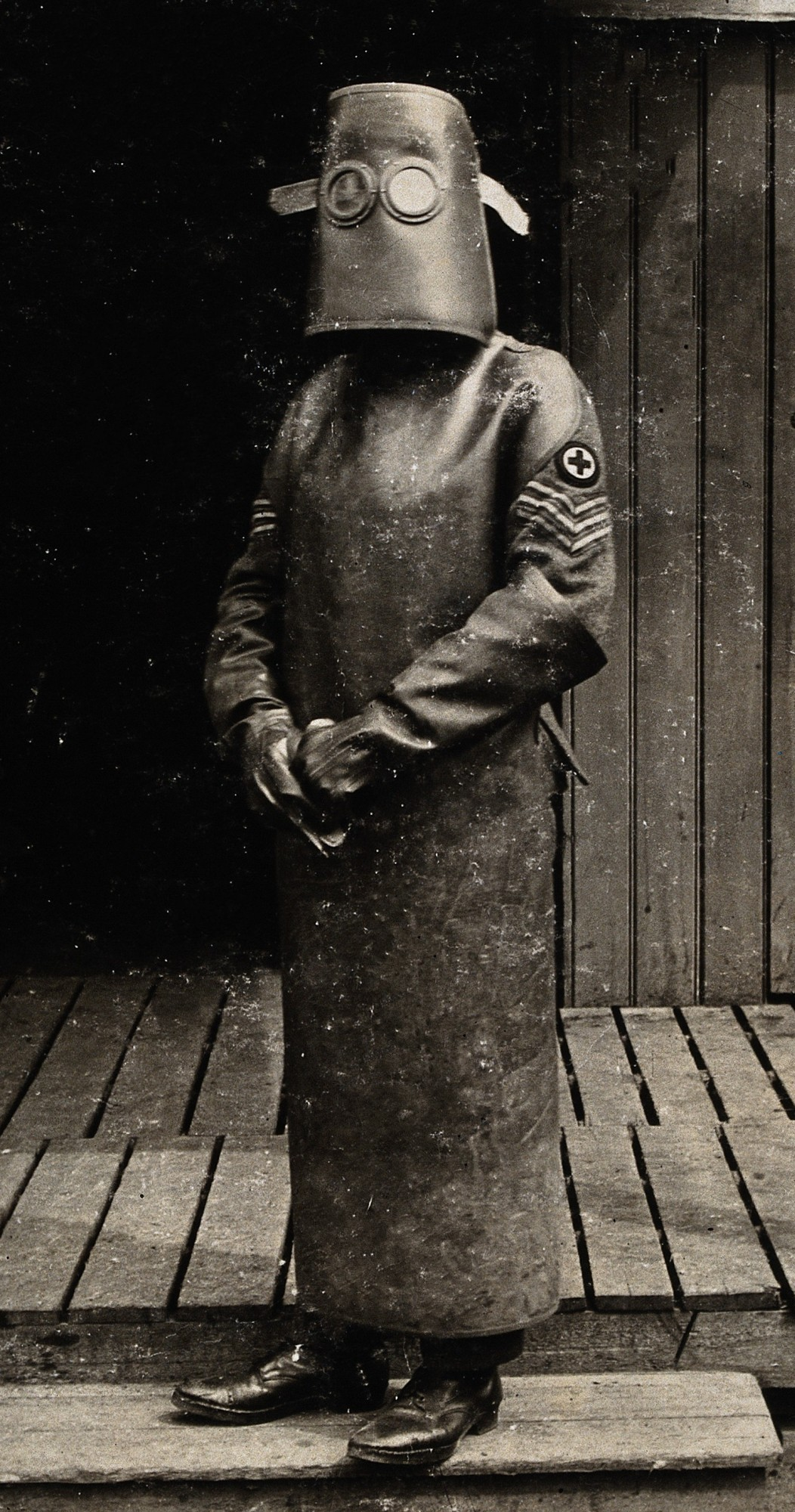
A radiographer wearing an early hazmat suit in 1918 during World War I.

An early primitive form of the hazmat suit arose during bubonic plague epidemics, when European plague doctors of the 16th and 17th centuries wore distinctive costumes consisting of bird-like beak masks and large overcoats while treating victims of the bubonic plague. At the time, it was thought that the inhalation of "bad air" was the cause of disease (a theory known as the miasma theory), so the bird-like beak masks functioned as respirators that contained aromatic items such as herbs and dried flowers. The modern hazmat suit is believed to originate from the Manchurian plague of 1910–1911, wherein Malayan physician Wu Lien-teh promoted the use of various forms of personal protective equipment to prevent the spread of the pneumonic plague.

== Capabilities ==
=== Overview ===
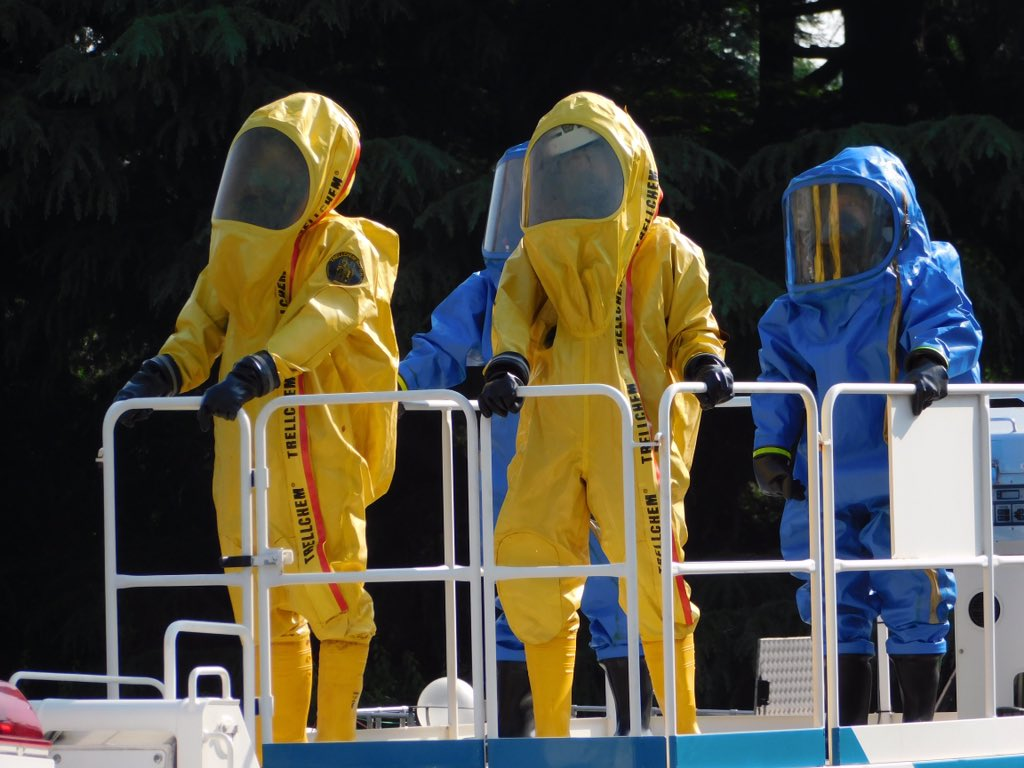
Tokyo Metropolitan Police Department officers wearing hazmat suits.

The United States Department of Homeland Security defines a hazmat suit as "an overall garment worn to protect people from hazardous materials or substances, including chemicals, biological agents, or radioactive materials." More generally, hazmat suits may provide protection from:

Chemical agents
through the use of appropriate barrier materials like teflon, heavy PVC or rubber and Tyvek
Nuclear agents
possibly through radiation shielding in the lining, but more importantly by preventing direct contact with or inhalation of radioactive particles or gas
Biological agents
through fully sealed systems—often at overpressure to prevent contamination even if the suit is damaged or using powered air purifying respirators with full hoods and protective suits to prevent exposure (level C protection level)
Fire/high temperatures
usually by a combination of insulating and reflective materials which reduce the effects (see also fire proximity suit)

The hazmat suit generally includes breathing air supplies to provide clean, uncontaminated air for the wearer. In laboratory use, clean air may be supplied through attached hoses. This air is usually pumped into the suit at positive pressure with respect to the surroundings as an additional protective measure against the introduction of dangerous agents into a potentially ruptured or leaking suit.

Working in a hazmat suit is very strenuous, as the suits tend to be less flexible than conventional work garments. With the exception of laboratory versions, hazmat suits can be hot and poorly ventilated (if at all). Therefore, use is usually limited to short durations of up to 2 hours, depending on the difficulty of the work. Level A (United States) suits, for example, are limited by their air supply to around 15–20 minutes of very strenuous work (such as a firefighting rescue in a building). However, OSHA/EPA protective level A suits/ensembles are not typically used in firefighting rescue, especially during a building/structure fire. National Fire Protection Association (NFPA) compliant "turnout gear", and NIOSH-certified or CBRN self-contained breathing apparatus (SCBA) are the primary protection technologies for structure firefighting in the US.

=== Ratings ===
==== In the United States ====
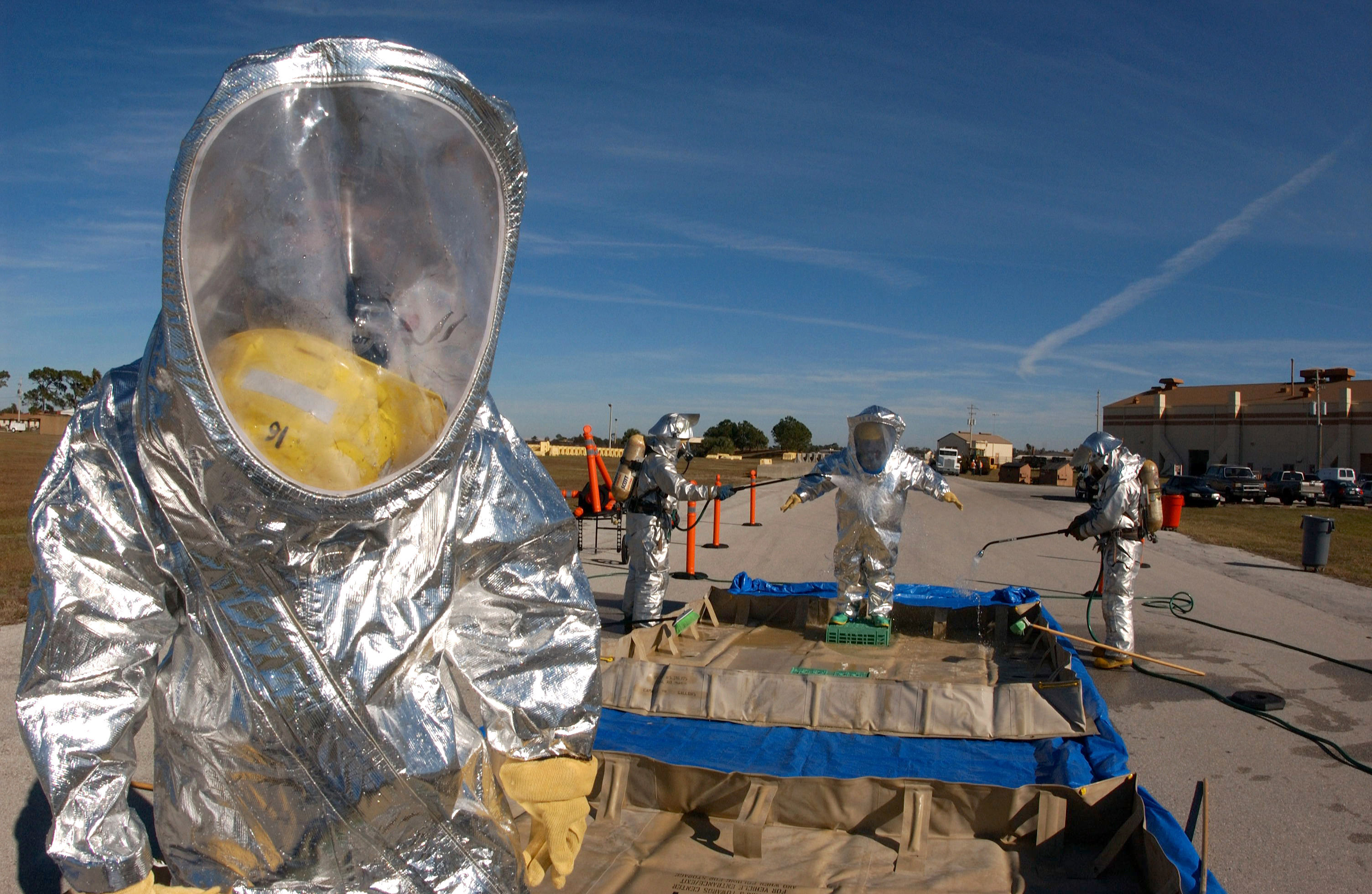
United States Air Force firefighters wearing hazmat suits with an outer aluminized shell during an emergency management exercise.

Hazmat protective clothing is classified as any of Level A, B, C, or D, based upon the degree of protection they provide.

Level A
The highest level of protection against vapors, gases, mists, and particles is Level A, which consists of a fully encapsulating chemical entry suit with a full-facepiece self-contained breathing apparatus (SCBA). A person must also wear boots with steel toes and shanks on the outside of the suit and specially selected chemical-resistant gloves for this level of protection. The breathing apparatus is worn inside (encapsulated within) the suit. To qualify as Level A protection, an intrinsically safe two-way radio is also worn inside the suit, often incorporating voice-operated microphones and an earpiece speaker for monitoring the operations channel.
Level B
Level B protection requires a garment (including SCBA) that provides protection against splashes from a hazardous chemical. Since the breathing apparatus is sometimes worn on the outside of the garment, Level B protection is not vapor-protective. Level B suits can also be fully encapsulating, which helps prevent the SCBA from becoming contaminated. It is worn when vapor-protective clothing (Level A) is not required. Wrists, ankles, facepiece and hood, and waist are secured to prevent any entry of splashed liquid. Depending on the chemical being handled, specific types of gloves and boots are donned. These may or may not be attached to the garment. The garment itself may be one piece or a two-piece hooded suit. Level B protection also requires the wearing of chemical-resistant boots with steel toes and shanks on the outside of the garment. As with Level A, chemical-resistant gloves and two-way radio communications are also required.
Level C
Level C protection differs from Level B in the area of equipment needed for respiratory protection. The same type of garment used for Level B protection is worn for Level C. Level C protection allows for the use of respiratory protection equipment other than SCBA. This protection includes any of the various types of air-purifying respirators. People should not use this level of protection unless the specific hazardous material is known and its concentration can be measured. Level C equipment does not offer the protection needed in an oxygen deficient atmosphere.
Level D
Level D protection does not protect the person from chemical exposure. Therefore, this level of protection can only be used in situations where a person has no possibility of contact with chemicals. A pair of coveralls or other work-type garment along with chemical-resistant footwear with steel toes and shanks are all that is required to qualify as Level D protection. Most firefighter turnout gear is considered to be Level D.

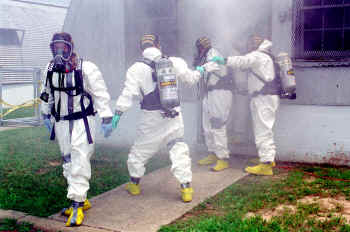
A hazmat suit group wearing Type C's

==== In Europe ====
Most suits used in Europe are covered by a set EU Norms, and divided into a total of six types (levels) of protection:

- Type 1: Protects against liquid and gaseous chemicals. Gas tight. (EN 943 part 1). More or less equivalent to US level A.
- Type 2: Protects against liquid and gaseous chemicals. Non gas tight. (EN 943 part 1). More or less equivalent to US level B.^{1}
- Type 3: Protects against liquid chemicals for a limited period. Liquid jet tight. (EN 14605)
- Type 4: Protects against liquid chemicals for a limited period. Liquid saturation tight. (EN 14605). More or less equivalent to US level C.
- Type 5: Protects against airborne dry particulates for a limited period. (EN ISO 13982-1).
- Type 6: Protects against a light spray of liquid chemicals (EN 13034). More or less equivalent to US level D.

^{1}: Can be used in places where the chemical in gaseous form isn't harmful to the body exterior.

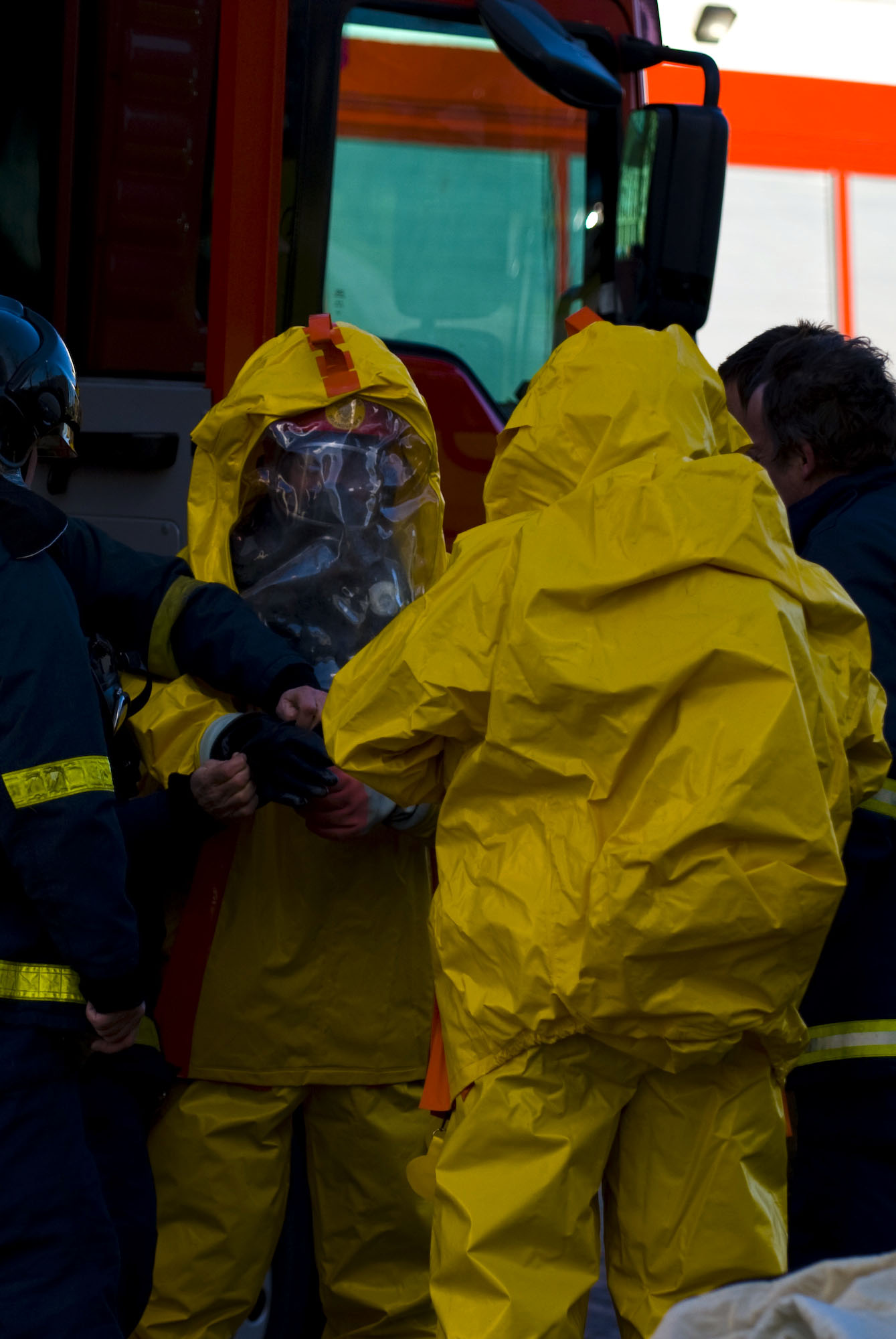
Level A/type 1 suit. SCBA is inside suit.

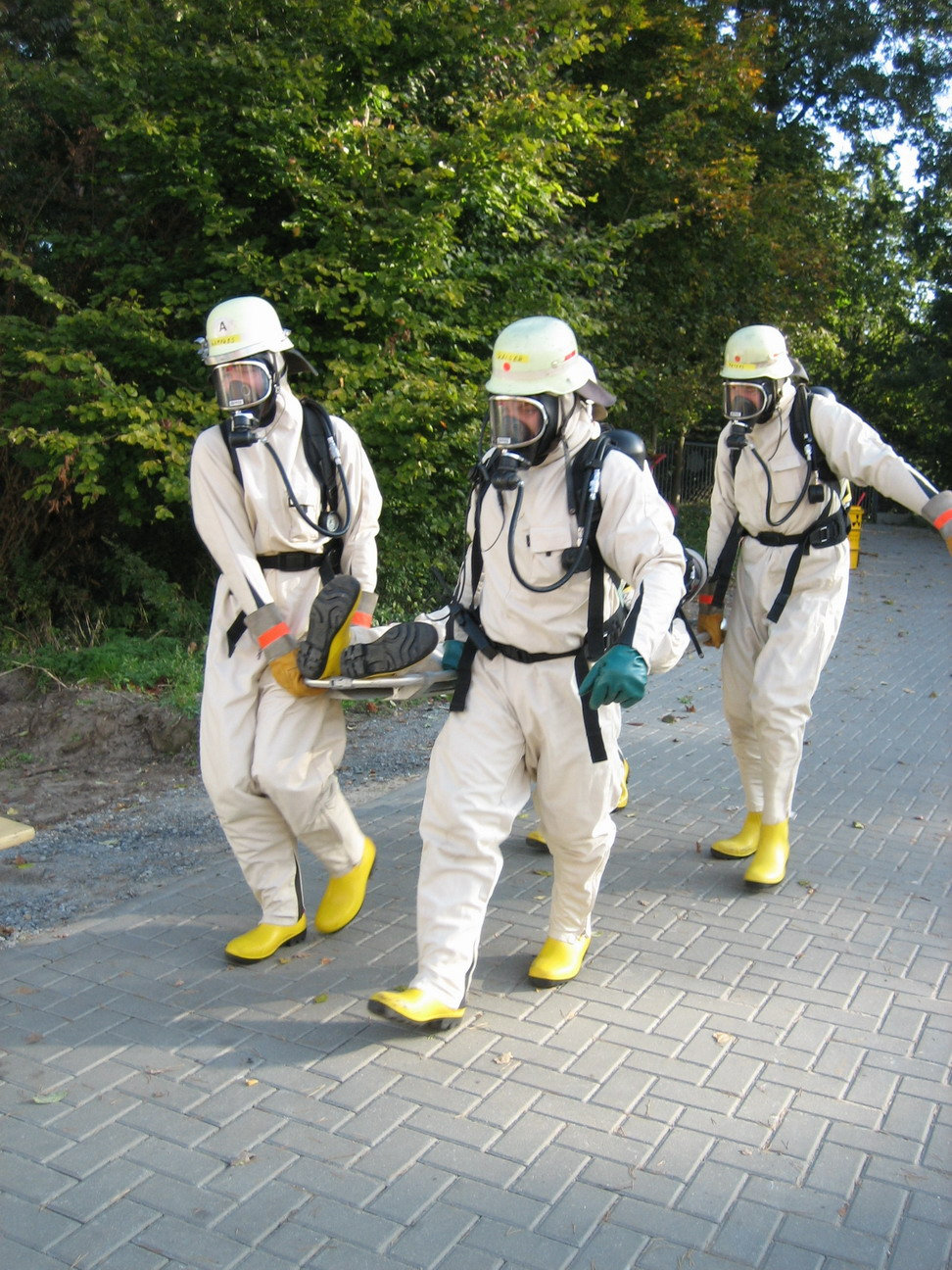
Level B/type 2 suit. SCBA is outside

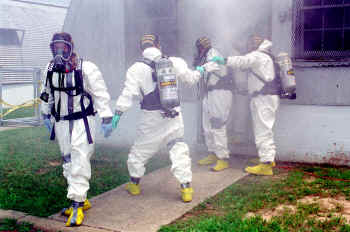
Level C/type 4 suit.

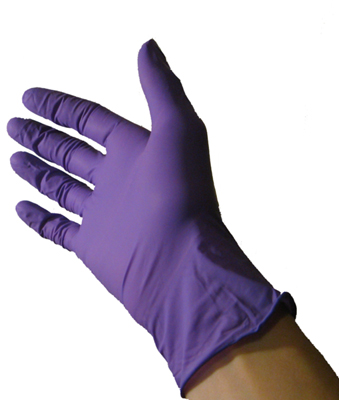
Type 6 glove made of nitrile rubber.

==== GOST System ====
In the GOST system of norms, EN 943 is equivalent to GOST 12.4.284.2-2014.

==== In Brazil ====
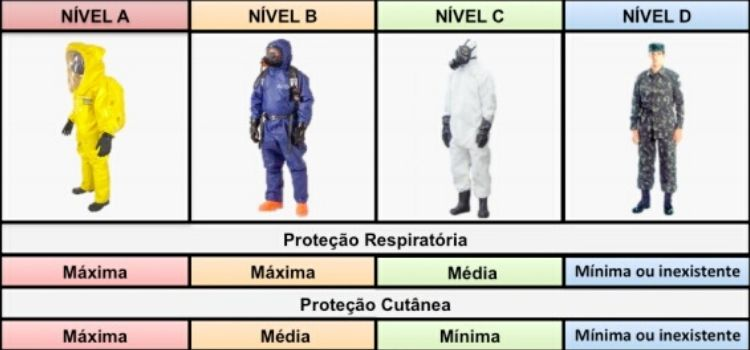
Different levels of hazmat suits used by the Brazilian Armed Forces.

Following the American standards, there are 4 different types of suits, from A to D. The suits are known to the Brazilian military as Roupa Protetora Permeável de Combate (Protective Permeable Combat Clothing). There are within the Brazilian military several specialized hazmat regiments. The regiments were deployed during the FIFA 2014 World Cup, 2016 Summer Olympics in Rio de Janeiro, and the COVID-19 pandemic.

== Types ==
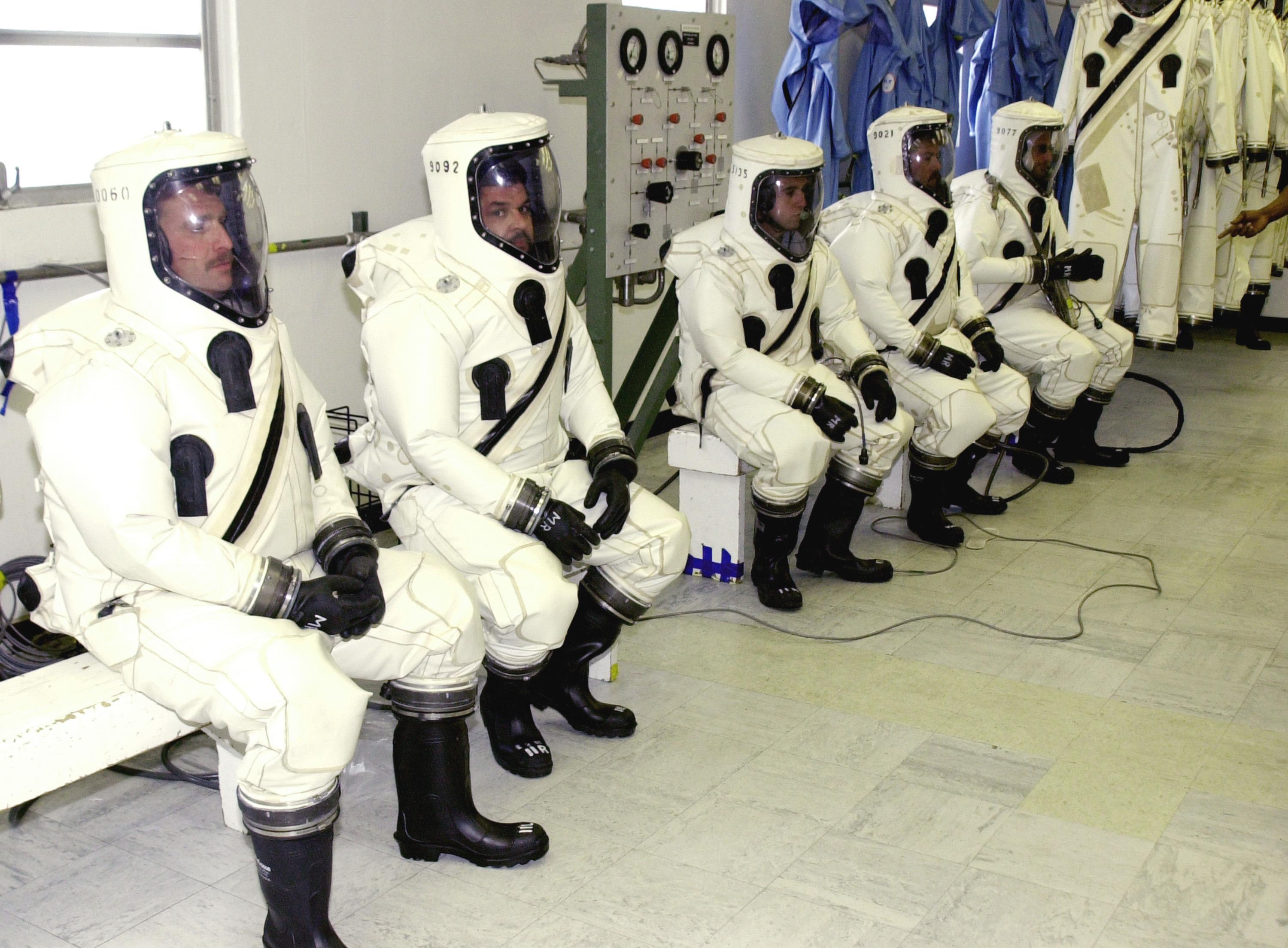
NASA technicians in SCAPE suits prepare to fuel a spacecraft.

Hazmat suits come in two variations: splash protection and gastight suits. The splash protection suits are designed to prevent the wearer from coming into contact with a liquid. These suits do not protect against gases or dust. Gastight suits additionally protect against gases and dust.

=== Gas/vapor protection ===
Such suits (level A in the US) are gas or vapor-tight, providing total encapsulation and the highest level of protection against direct and airborne chemical contact. They are typically worn with a self-contained breathing apparatus (SCBA) enclosed within the suit.

These suits are typically constructed of several layers and, being airtight, include a release valve so the suit does not overinflate from air exhaled by the SCBA. The release valve does retain some air to keep some positive pressure ("overpressure") inside the suit. As noted, such suits are usually limited to just 15–20 minutes of use by their mobile air supply.

With each suit described here, there is a manufactured device designed to protect the respiratory system of the wearer (called a respirator) while the suit/ensemble is used to protect skin exposed to potential hazardous dermal agents. A respirator may be something as simple as a headband strap filtering facepiece respirator (FFR); to a head harness negative pressure full face respirator (air-purifying respirator/APR); to a full face, tight fitting, closed breathing air; or open circuit, self-contained breathing apparatus (CC-SCBA or SCBA).

=== Splash protection ===
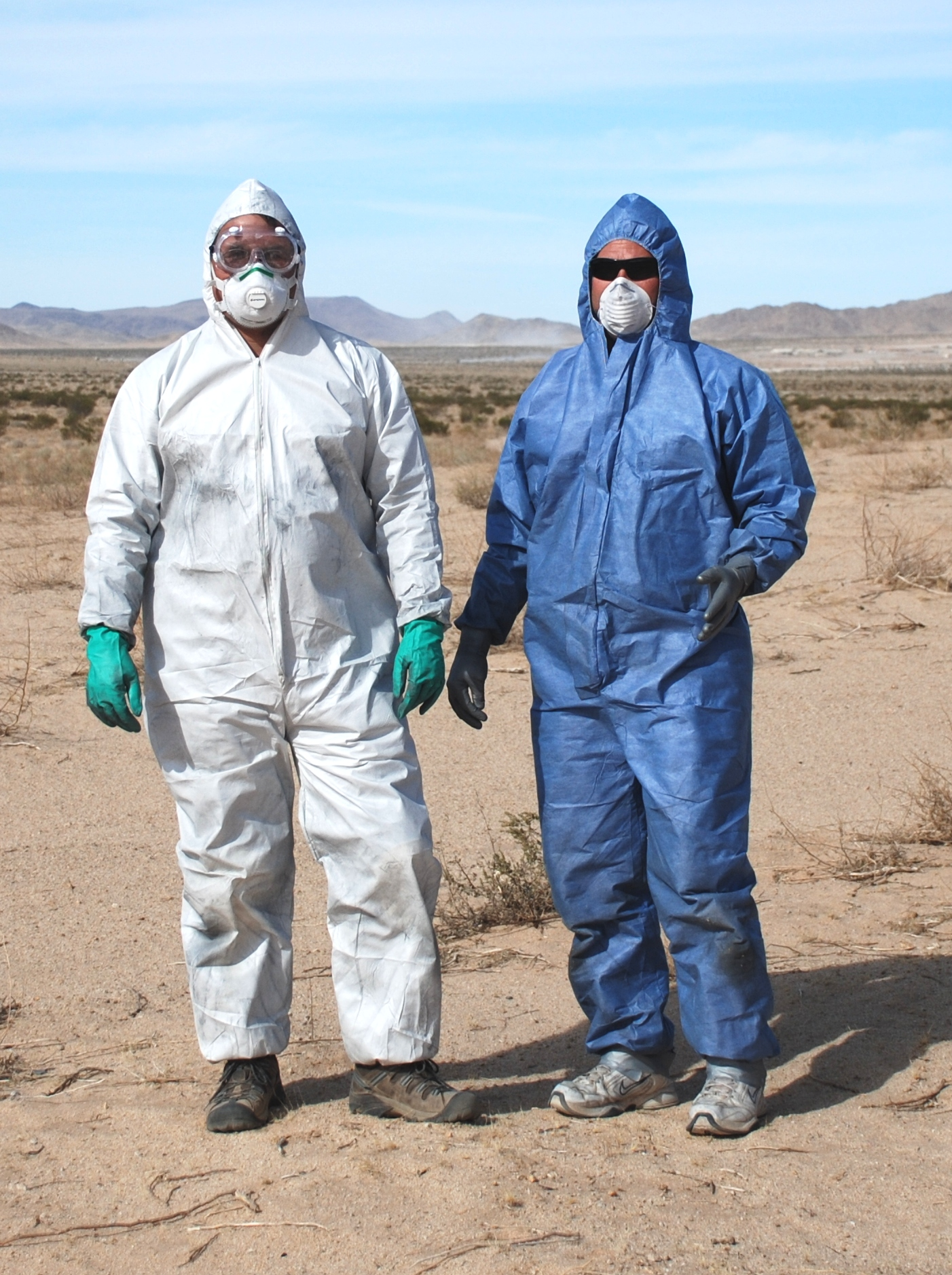
Tyvek coveralls.

Such suits (level B in the US) are not vapor-tight and thus provide a lesser level of protection. They are, however, worn with an SCBA, which may be located inside or outside of the suit, depending on the type of suit (encapsulating or non-encapsulating). They more closely resemble the one-piece Tyvek coveralls often seen used in construction and demolition work. Yet, Level B splash suits may also be fully encapsulating suits which are simply not airtight.

Lesser protection (level C in the US) suits may be coveralls of treated material, or multi-piece combinations, sealed with tape. This kind of protection is still "proof" against many non-invasive substances, such as anthrax.

== See also ==
- Bunker gear – Personal protective equipment used by firefighters
- CBRN defense – Protective measures against hazardous materials warfare, new military equivalent of NBC (now with radiological)
- Demron – Non-toxic and flexible polymer radiation-shielding fabric
- Fire proximity suit – Suit designed to protect from high temperatures
- MOPP – Protective gear used by U.S. military personnel in a toxic environment, military equivalent
- NBC suit – Type of military personal protective equipment, military equivalent
- Plague doctor's outfit – Clothing worn by plague doctors that was intended to protect them from infection, historical equivalent
- Positive pressure personnel suit – Air-tight industrial protection garment
- Suitport – Alternative technology to enable extravehicular activity
- Chemical Biological Incident Response Force – CBRE Response unit in the United States Marine Corps
