= Lancs Industries =

- Industry: Manufacturing
- Founded: 1974
- Headquarters: Kirkland, WA, U.S.
- Products: Industrial safety supplies
- Website: www.lancsindustries.com

Lancs Industries is a manufacturer of protective clothing, containments, gloveboxes, enclosures, lead shielding, and other supplies used for reducing risk and increasing safety of workers in potentially hazardous environments.

Founded in 1974, Lancs Industries is headquartered, and has a 10,000-square-foot (930 m^{2}) facility in Kirkland, WA, with a field office in Warwick, RI, and provides products for both public and private entities such as, Naval shipyards, nuclear power plants, and Department of Energy lab facilities.

== History ==
Lancs Industries was founded by Graham Hollingsworth. As a native of Lancashire, England, Hollingsworth was an employee of British Aircraft Corporation working as an aeronautical engineer who came to the United States in 1966 for an engineering exchange program with Boeing Aircraft. Choosing to remain in the U.S. as a Boeing employee after the exchange period ended, he worked on the Supersonic Transport (SST) program in the Seattle metropolitan area. This program was terminated and Hollingsworth ultimately left Boeing in 1974.

Hollingsworth launched Lancs Industries in 1974, as a sign-making company serving the industrial safety market. Projects for Mare Island Naval Shipyard eventually led to the company's expansion into fabricating plastic barriers, containments, and protective gear using radio-frequency (RF) heat sealing technology. As the U.S. Nuclear Navy expanded throughout the 1970s, the need increased for radiological safety items used in construction and maintenance of nuclear-powered ships at Naval shipyards. Lancs worked closely with the Reactor Plant Services (RPS) group at the Electric Boat Division of General Dynamics, designing, fabricating, and supplying these items.

The use of lead wool radiation shielding and heat-sealed plastics for contamination control in commercial nuclear power plants took a dramatic upswing in 1979 as a result of the nuclear accident at Three Mile Island Nuclear Generating Station. This led to the hiring of Ron Therrien from Electric Boat's RPS in 1983 to address the expanded market for Lancs products in all electrical utility-owned nuclear plants located in North America.

As the Cold War progressed toward the eventual termination of the nuclear weapons program in 1989, the Nuclear Weapons Production Complex operated by the U.S. Department of Energy, consisting of many National laboratories and production facilities, was quickly transformed into a series of radiological decommissioning, decontamination, and remediation projects. These activities ignited a large and continuing demand for supplies and equipment needed to protect human workers from ionizing radiation and prevent the spread of radioactive contamination when dealing with radioactive waste operations. Personal protective equipment and clothing, containment tents, glovebags, drum liners, covers, flexible sleeving and sheeting, all became instrumental in performing this hazardous waste cleanup work.

By the year 2001, Lancs had grown in size and reputation to the point that Hollingsworth decided to sell the company. The company was acquired in early 2002 by Tim Wiest, a former Naval officer in the nuclear power program and telecom industry executive. Under his direction, the company has continued to expand and address a wider set of customer needs with increased responsiveness and sophistication.

Buoyed by an increase in spending in the nuclear power field, Lancs Industries posted record revenue for the company in 2009. Company owner Tim Wiest expected a strong year in 2010 due to stimulus money and increased demand. "It's good to see the optimism for this industry," He said.

Lancs Industries is a member of the Nuclear Suppliers Association.

== Methods ==
Loose radioactive particles can be found throughout a radiological work facility. Barriers made of flexible materials help to confine the spread of this contamination and to protect workers from exposure. Barriers can be in the form of different configurations such as, sleeving, glovebags, containment tents, catch containments, bags, covers and protective clothing.

Sleeving provided on rolls is often cut to length and used to cover radioactive material to prevent the spread of contamination during handling. Typically made of PVC or Polyurethane film formed into a flexible tube, sleeving can cover pipes, hoses, and cables to provide a protective layer. To handle odd-sized objects, adequately sized sleeving is opened so an object can be inserted into the tube which is then twisted to enclose the item at both ends. Tape can be used to secure the twists in place, and then cut free for handling. This is commonly referred to as "horsetailing".

Glovebags help to confine contamination at the source, limiting the spread to the space inside the glovebag. Glovebag chambers can be fabricated in limitless shapes and sizes, forming a barrier to enclose a workspace. With attached glovesleeves that allow access for handling, transfer ports to move objects into and out of the chamber, and service sleeves for tooling and ventilation, glovebags can be made to accommodate a wide range of operations on hazardous material without directly touching the items.
