= Instruments used in radiology =

Instruments used specially in radiology are as follows:

Instrument	Uses
Ultrasonography machine	uses ultrasound to produce images from within the body; video link
X-ray	uses X-rays to produce images of structures within the body; video link
Contrast media for X-rays	to provide a high contrast image of the details of the viscera under study; e.g. salts of heavy metals, gas like air, radio-opaque dyes, organic iodides, etc.
Echocardiography machine	sonography of the heart is done here to know its function and state
Computer axial tomography scan (CT Scan)/(CAT Scan)	to visualize the interior of the body in slices (traditionally showing horizontal slices); video link
Magnetic resonance imaging (MRI) alias Nuclear magnetic resonance (NMR)	high strength (0.15 to 1.5 teslas) are used to excite protons that produce the record results (like CT scan). It can show particular tissues more clearly than CT.; video link
Linear accelerator	used in radiotherapy for cancer
Functional magnetic resonance imaging (fMRI)	video link
Positron emission tomography (PET Scan)	video link
Radio-isotope scan or nuclear scintigraphy	These radioactive compounds are administered so that specific tissues take them up. The amount and anatomical detail of the uptake produces the scan result.
SPECT scan	video link
Interventional radiology	minimally invasive surgeries under radiological imaging, e.g. angioplasty, TIPS.
Brachytherapy apparatus	video link
Lead shielding	visual and physical protection from x-ray

== Image gallery ==
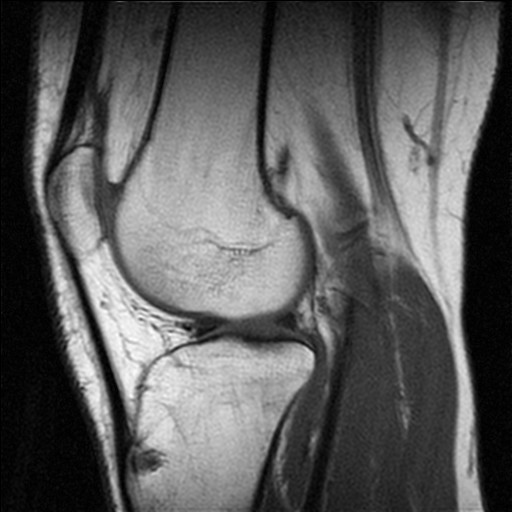
Sagittal MRI of the knee

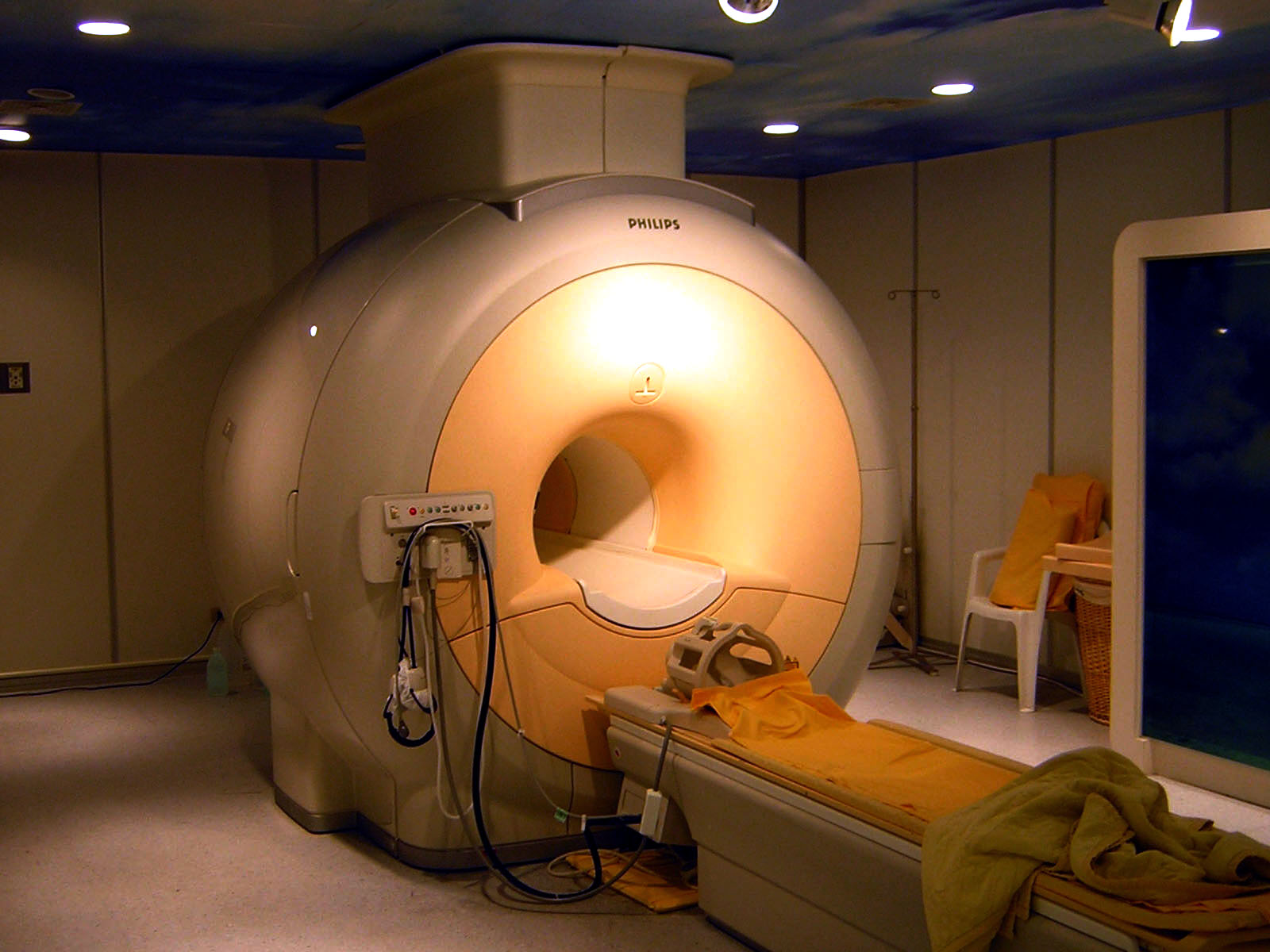
A 3 tesla MRI scanner

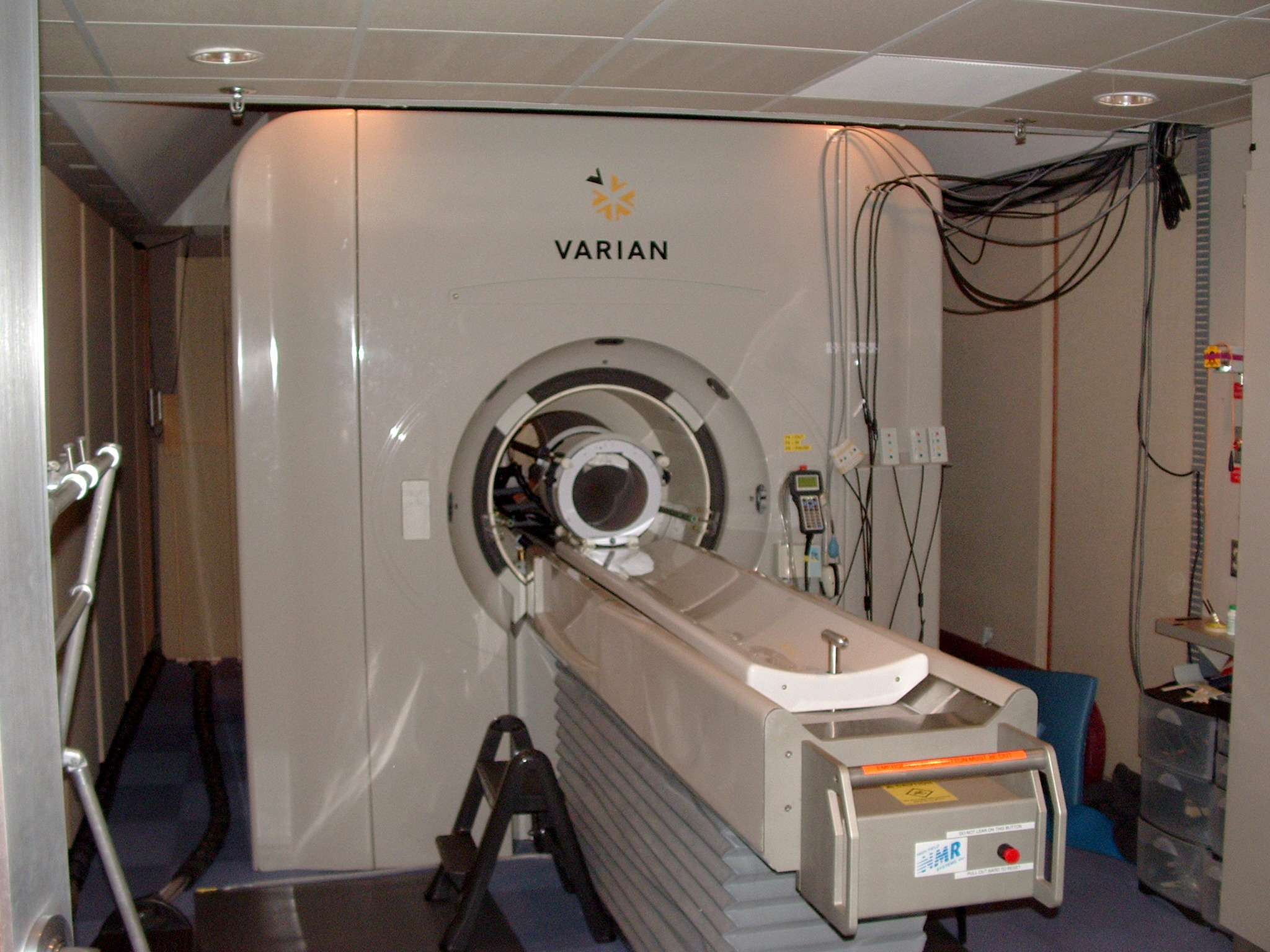
fMRI scanner

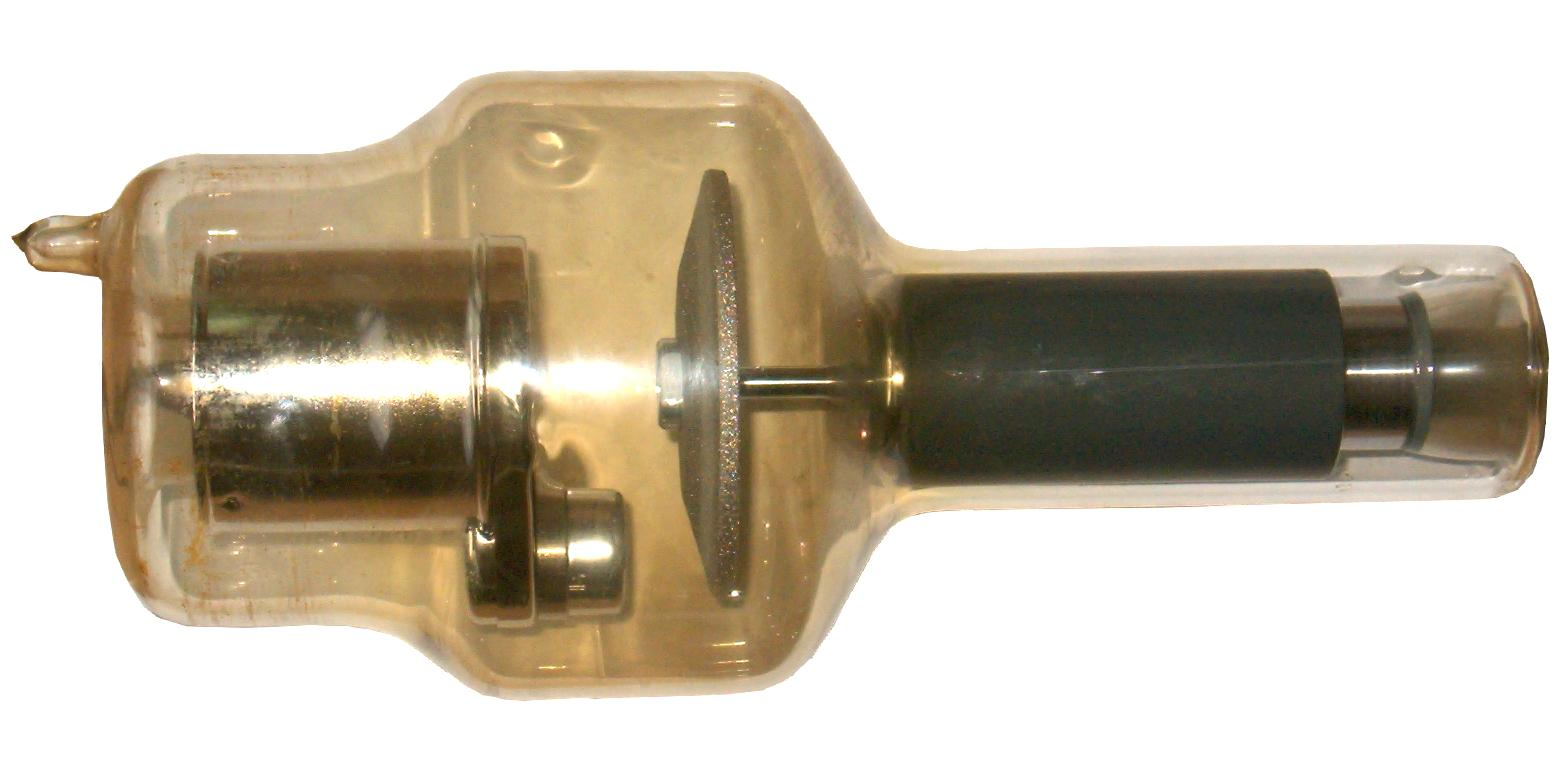
Rotating anode X-ray tube

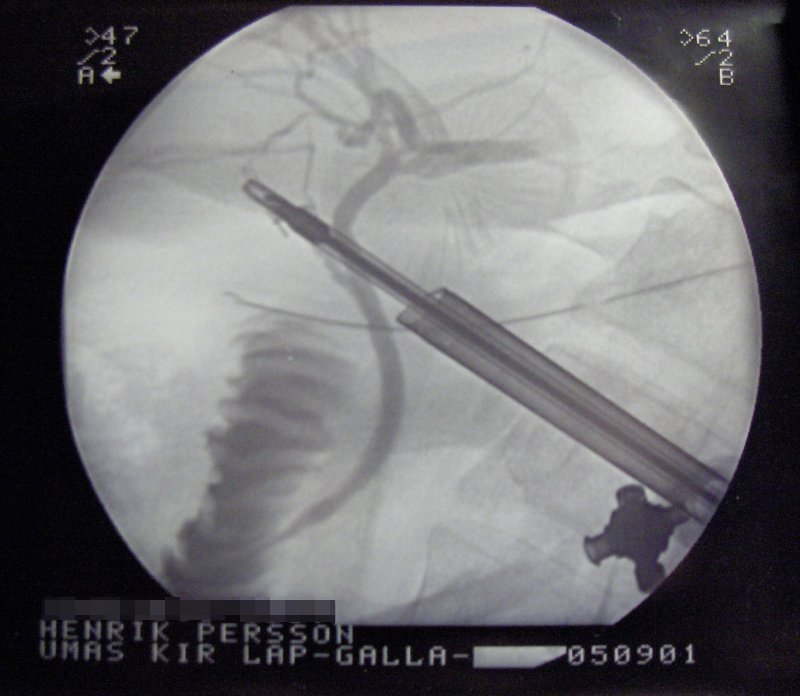
X-ray guided cholecystectomy

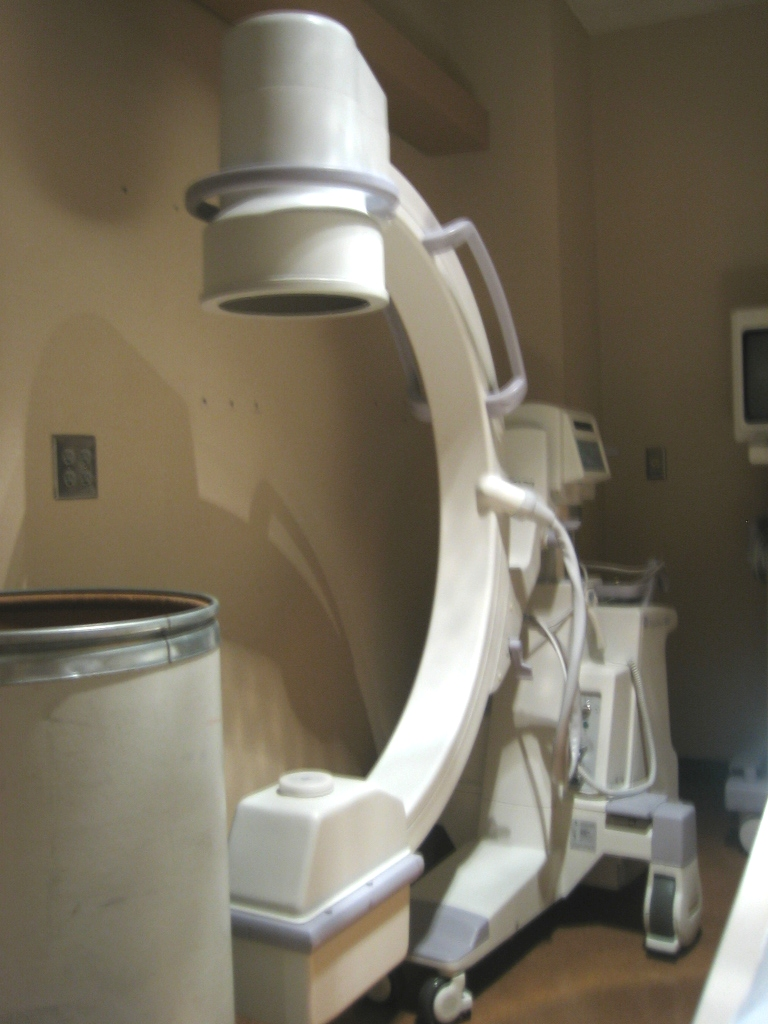
Mobile fluoroscopy machine
