= Maria Lanc =

Austrian humanitarian (1911-1995)

Maria Lanc (born Maria Jenewein; 1911 – 15 November 1995) was an Austrian humanitarian.

She lived in Gmünd, Lower Austria with her husband Arthur Lanc, a medical officer, in 1944. He and his wife owned the house number 35 in Kirchengasse.

In the early summer of 1944 a carriage of 1700 Hungarian Jews which were sheltered in a grain silo, arrived in Gmünd. Arthur and Maria Lanc decided to help the inmates of the camp by all available means to alleviate their suffering. They collected clothes, food, medicine and baby linen.

In the late autumn of 1944 an order was issued that in case that the frontline approaches the Jews should be transferred to a concentration camp in order to be killed. The date for the evacuation of the Jews was assigned for the end of March. Arthur Lanc hurried to the camp and decided to rescue three Jewish families - the family Fisch with three children aged five, four and one, the Yugoslavian nurse Piroska Blau and Georg Uhely, a lawyer from Ödenburg.

In the night these three families flew through a small backdoor of the grain silo. At first the fugitives were hidden at the place of forester Christ, afterwards they were housed and hidden in the house of Arthur and Maria Lanc - conscious that an act like this was under threat of death penalty.

On 16 December 1986 Maria Lanc and her husband Arthur Lanc were bestowed the medal of the Righteous among the Nations by Yad Vashem during a festive ceremony in Vienna.

== Literature ==
- Israel Gutman; Daniel Fraenkel; Jacob Borut (2005). Lexikon der Gerechten unter den Völkern: Deutsche und Österreicher. Wallstein Verlag. p. 324. ISBN 978-3-89244-900-3.
