= Arthur Lanc =

Medical officer (1907-1995)

Arthur Lanc (20 March 1907, in Vienna, Austria – 20 May 1995, in Gmuend, Lower Austria) was a medical officer in Gmünd and responsible for the medical care for all Jewish forced laborers in the area of Gmünd. Administering medicine to these people was not allowed. Together with the veterinarian, Dr. Krisch, he set aside medicine for the Jewish forced laborers and helped three of them flee from a camp in Gmünd. Because of this medical care, the Jews managed to survive the NS-Terror in a hideout in the attic of the tannery Weißensteiner in Hoheneich. For that reason Lanc was honored by Yad Vashem by getting the honorary title Righteous among the Nations together with his wife Maria Lanc.

== Literature ==
- Erich Geppert, Karl Pichler: 800 Jahre Heidenreichstein, Waldviertel – Kultur und Geschichte.
- Israel Gutman, Daniel Fraenkel, Jacob Borut: Lexikon der Gerechten unter den Völkern: Deutsche und Österreicher, page 324 f. Wallstein Verlag, 2005
- Mosche Meisels: Die Gerechten Österreichs – Eine Dokumentation der Menschlichkeit. Published by the Austrian embassy in Tel Aviv. 1996, pages 48–49.
- Herbert Fritz, Peter Krause: Farben tragen – Farbe bekennen, 1938–1945, Katholische Korporierte in Widerstand und Verfolgung, pages 402–404. Published by Österr. Verein für Studentengeschichte, 2013
