= Lank (surname) =

Lank is a surname. Notable people with the surname include:

- Edith Lank (1926–2023), American author, advice columnist, and blogger
- Jeff Lank (born 1975), Canadian ice hockey player
- Mackenzie Lank (born 1994), American curler
- Patti Lank (born 1964), American curler
