= Lead shielding =

Type of radiation protection

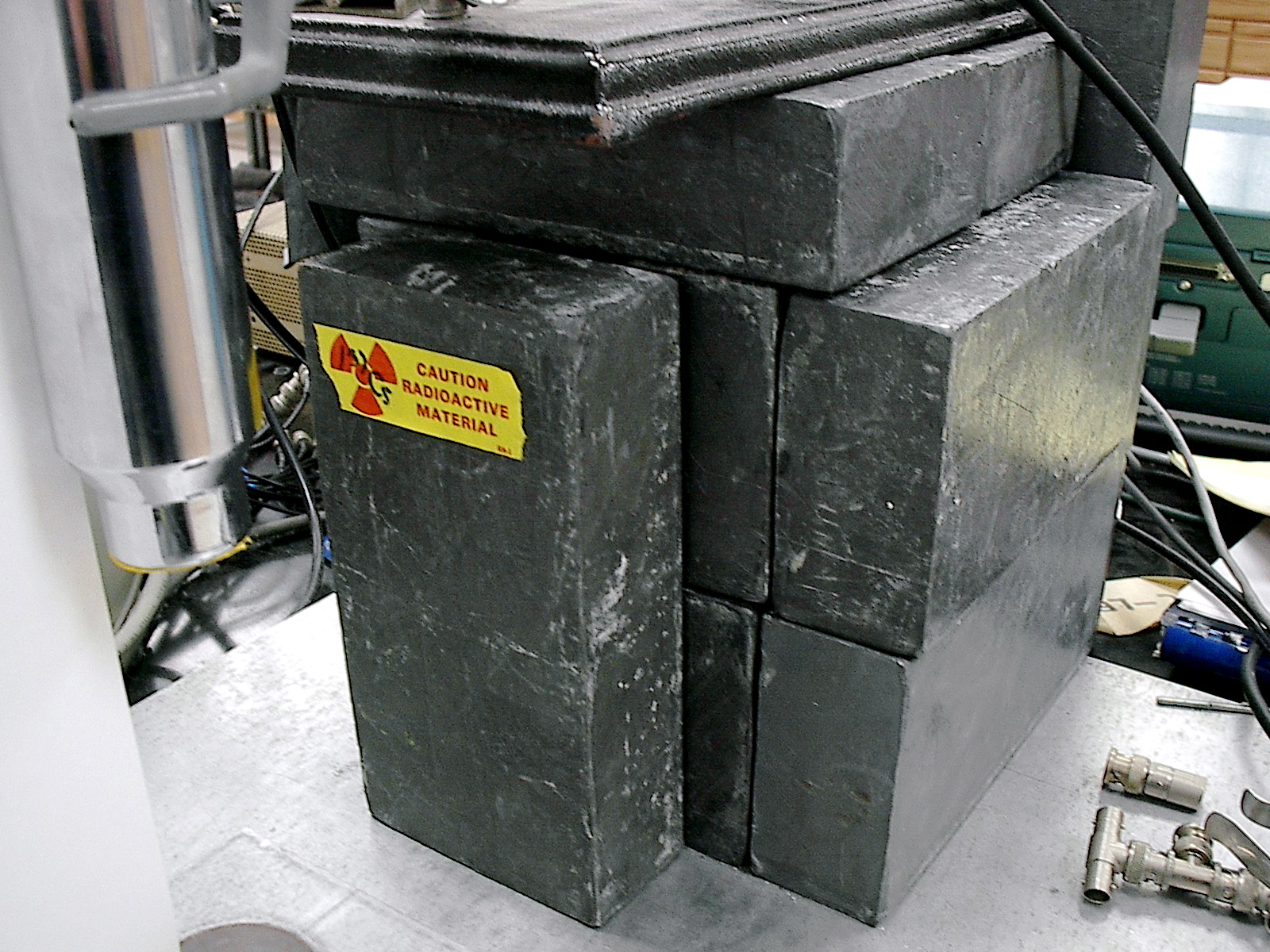
Lead bricks are commonly used as radiation shielding.

Lead shielding refers to the use of lead as a form of radiation protection to shield people or objects from radiation so as to reduce the effective dose. Lead can effectively attenuate certain kinds of radiation because of its high density and high atomic number; principally, it is effective at stopping gamma rays and x-rays.

== Operation ==
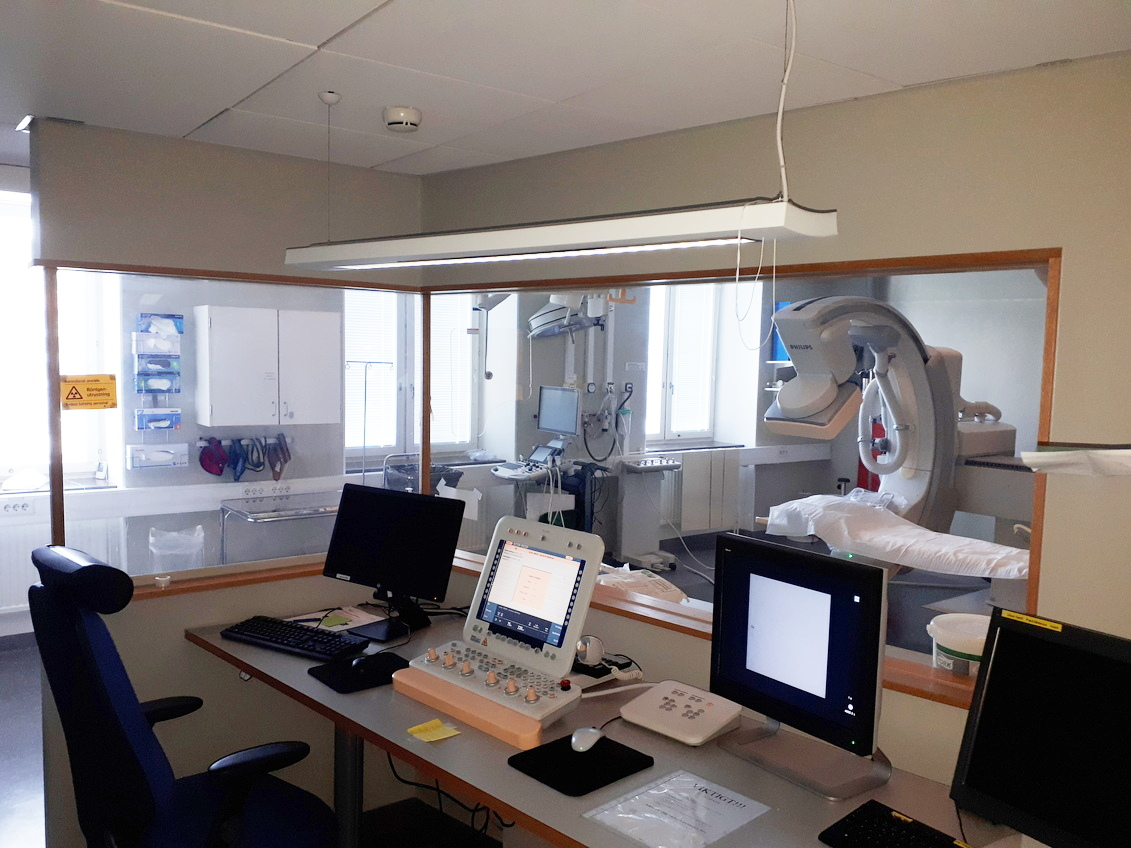
Fluoroscopy room with control space, separated by lead glass.

Lead's high density is caused by the combination of its high atomic number and the relatively short bond lengths and atomic radius. The high atomic number means that more electrons are needed to maintain a neutral charge and the short bond length and a small atomic radius means that many atoms can be packed into a particular lead structure.

Because of lead's density and large number of electrons, it is well suited to scattering x-rays and gamma-rays. These rays are photons, a type of boson, which impart energy onto electrons when they come into contact. Without a shield, the electrons within a person's body would be affected, which could damage their DNA. When the radiation attempts to pass through lead, its electrons absorb and scatter the energy. Eventually though, the lead will degrade from the energy to which it is exposed. However, lead is not effective against all types of radiation. High energy electrons (including beta radiation) incident on lead may create bremsstrahlung radiation, which is potentially more dangerous to tissue than the original radiation. Furthermore, lead is not a particularly effective absorber of neutron radiation.

== Types ==
Lead is used for shielding in x-ray machines, nuclear power plants, labs, medical facilities, military equipment, and other places where radiation may be encountered. There is great variety in the types of shielding available both to protect people and to shield equipment and experiments. In gamma-spectroscopy for example, lead castles are constructed to shield the probe from environmental radiation. Personal shielding includes lead aprons (such as the familiar garment used during dental x-rays), thyroid shields, and lead gloves. There are also a variety of shielding devices available for laboratory equipment, including lead castles, structures composed of lead bricks, and lead pigs, made of solid lead or lead-lined containers for storing and transporting radioactive samples. In many facilities where radiation is produced, regulations require construction with lead-lined plywood or drywall to protect adjoining rooms from scatter radiation.

=== Wear ===
A lead apron or leaded apron is a type of protective clothing that acts as a radiation shield. It is constructed of a thin rubber exterior and an interior of lead in the shape of a hospital apron. The purpose of the lead apron is to reduce exposure of a hospital patient to x-rays to vital organs that are potentially exposed to ionizing radiation during medical imaging that uses x-rays (radiography, fluoroscopy, computed tomography).

Protection of the reproductive organs with a lead rubber apron is considered important because DNA changes to sperm or egg cells of the patient may pass on genetic defects to the offspring of the patient, causing serious and unnecessary hardship for child and parents. However, modern understanding of radiobiology has improved considerably, and perceived hereditary risks of radiation exposure are now considered far lower than previously estimated. This has led to a substantial reduction in the tissue weighting factors allocated to patient gonads by the International Commission on Radiological Protection (ICRP). As a result, several major professional and regulatory bodies have issued position statements recommending the discontinuation of routine patient gonadal shielding, including the American Association of Physicists in Medicine, the National Council on Radiation Protection and Measurements, the Canadian Organization of Medical Physicists, a joint working party of the British Institute of Radiology and partner organisations, and a European consensus group. Implementation of these updated guidelines in paediatric radiography has been shown to be achievable with minimal concern from patients, families, and staff.

The thyroid gland is especially vulnerable to x-ray exposure. Care should be taken to place a lead apron over the thyroid gland before taking dental radiographs. Aprons used for dental imaging should include thyroid collars. However, in poorer or loosely regulated countries, possibly due to the cost of such equipment (approx. 40 USD), no such lead protection is given to the patients themselves, though the operators do get out of the x-ray room for their own safety.

The correct thickness of lead-equivalent (Pbeq) wear will depend on how long and how often the person is working in an exposed environment. The minimum requirement is to wear 0.25 mm Pbeq when not behind lead shielding. In a theatre using fluoroscopy (e.g. orthopaedics, cardiology or interventional radiology) 0.35 or 0.5 mm lead may be appropriate because of the higher KV employed, and on proximity to the primary beam.

=== Medical construction applications ===
Lead shielding plays a crucial role in the construction of medical imaging and radiation therapy facilities, such as x‑ray and CT rooms. These environments must be designed to prevent scatter and leakage radiation from exposing adjacent areas, particularly spaces occupied by staff or the public. To achieve this, lead is commonly incorporated into structural materials, including lead-lined drywall, plywood, and sheet lead barriers placed within walls, ceilings, and doors.

Determining the correct shielding thickness is guided by several factors, including radiation energy levels, equipment type, room layout, and adjacent occupancy. National and international standards (such as those from the NCRP and ICRP) provide calculations and guidelines for required lead equivalency.

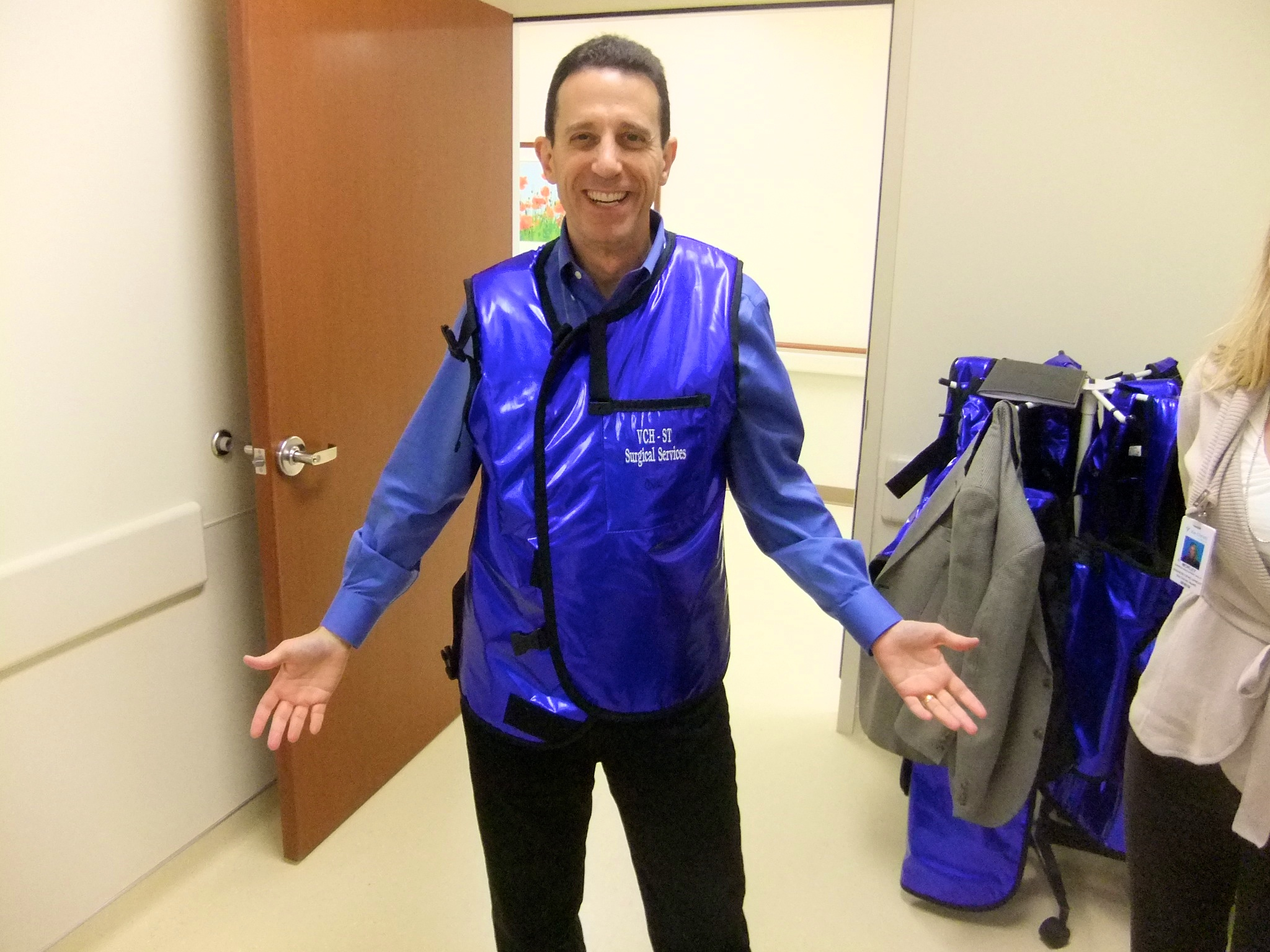
A rubber coated lead apron protects organs from exposure to x-rays.

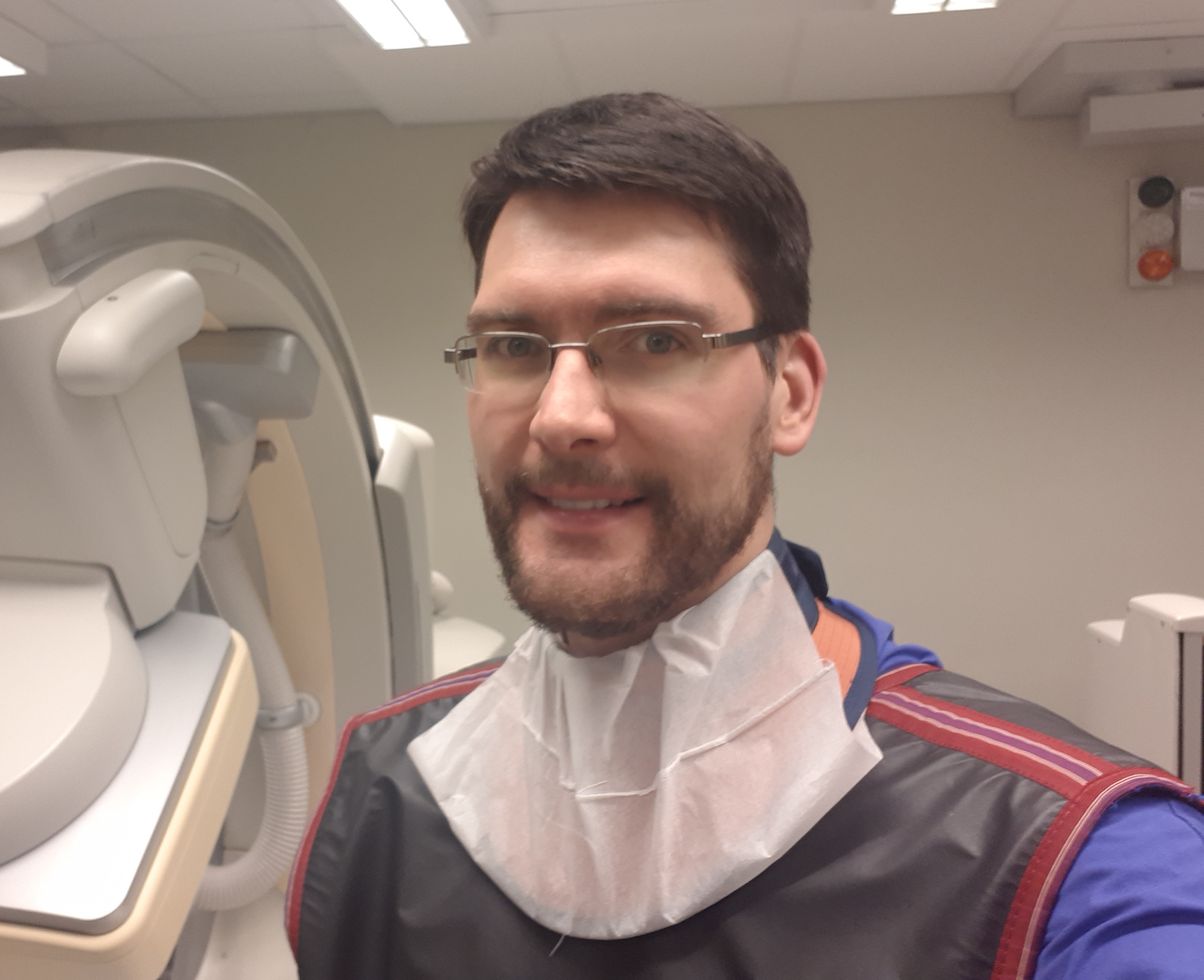
Thyroid gland protection

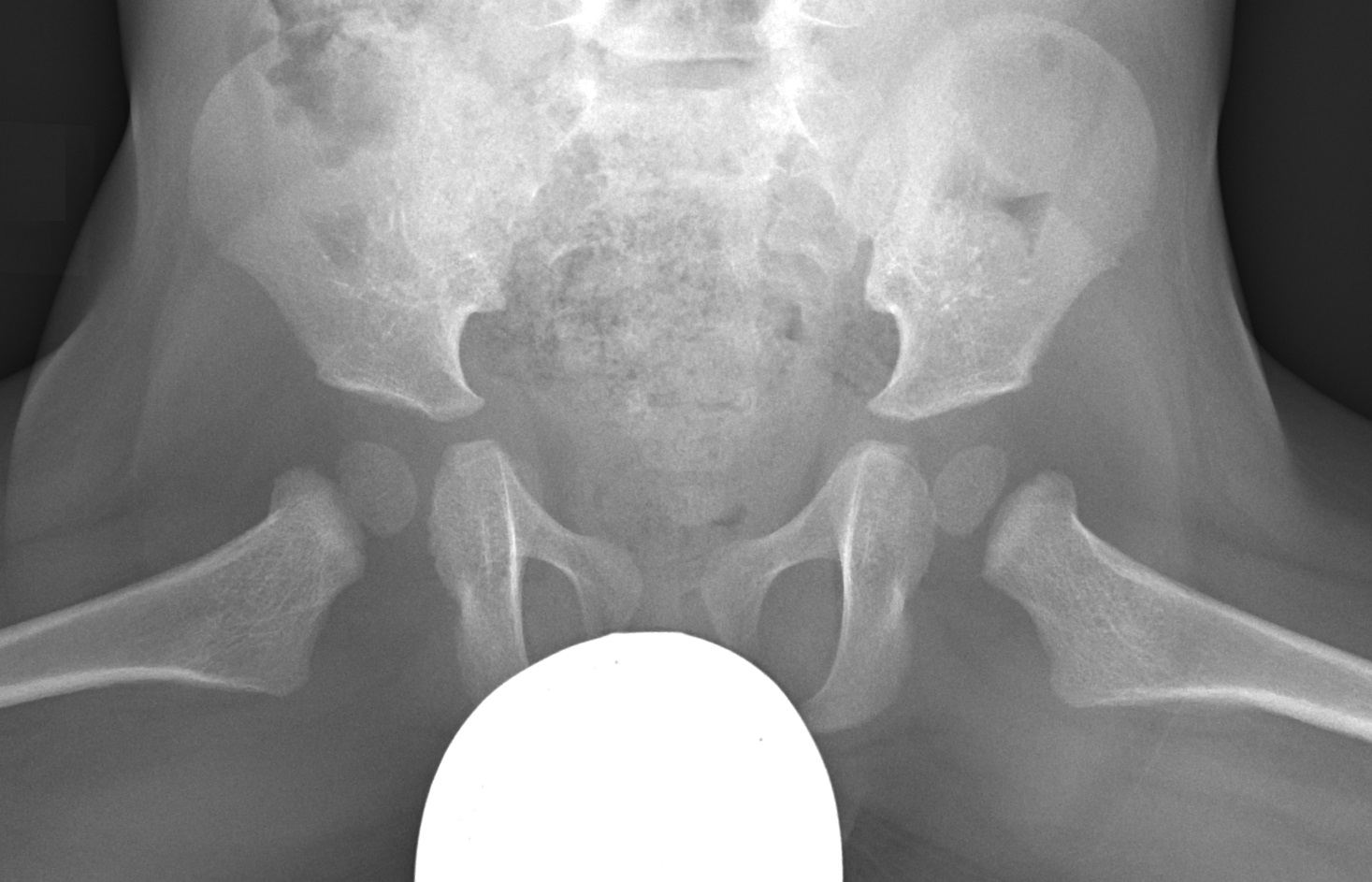
X-ray of the hips with a testicle shield

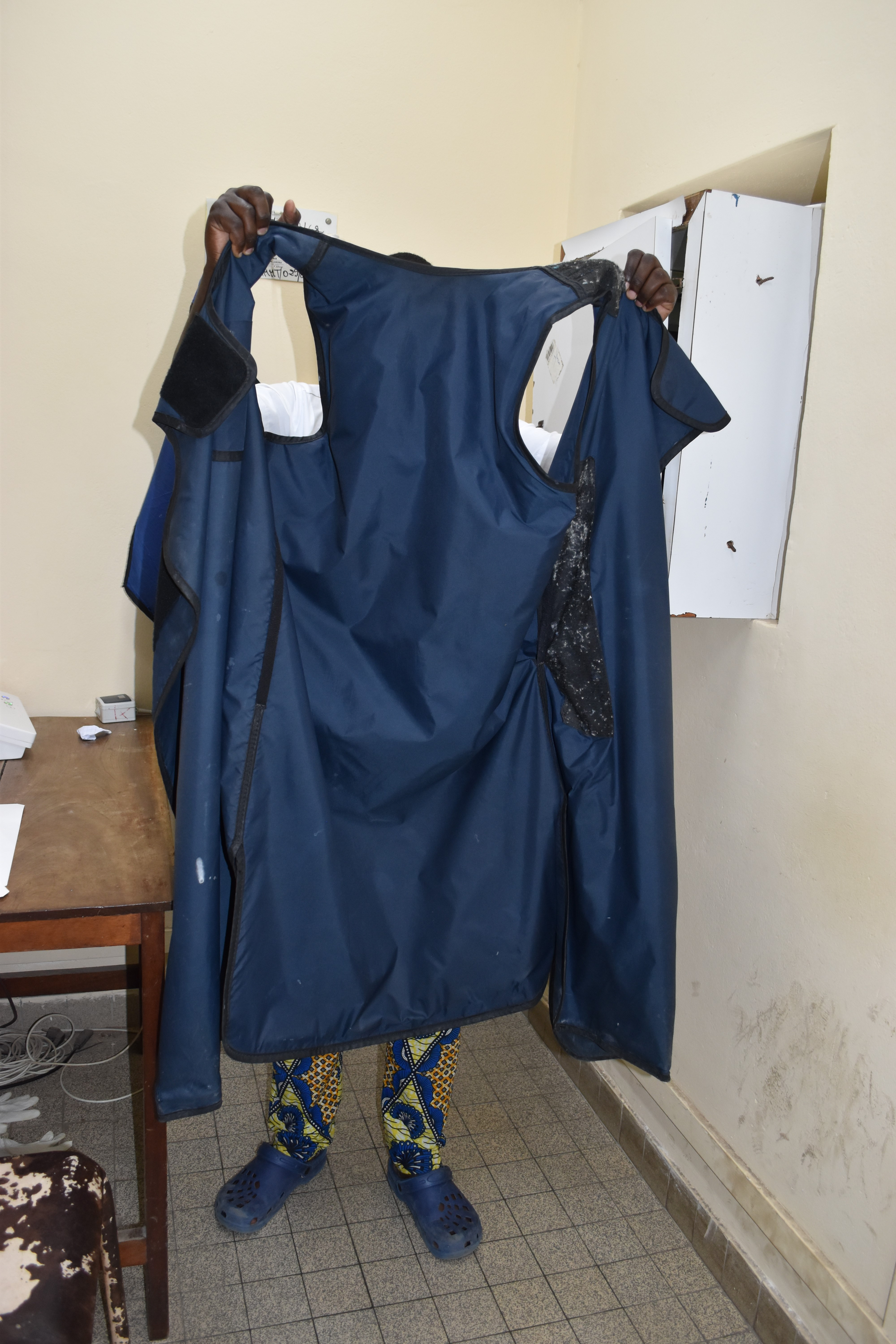
Lead apron against the negative effects of X-rays in a hospital in Benin

== See also ==
- Instruments used in radiology
- Radiation shielding
- Nuclear safety
- ALARA
- Fallout shelter
- Demron
- Stopping power
