= Lists of corporate headquarters by city =

This page is a list of pages listing corporate headquarters and corporations headquartered in particular cities.

== Canada ==
- Moncton, New Brunswick
- Winnipeg, Manitoba

== Hong Kong and Macau ==
- Hong Kong
- Macau

== India ==
- Gurgaon, Haryana
- Hyderabad, Telangana

== United Kingdom ==
- Bradford, West Yorkshire
- Greater Manchester
- Harrogate, North Yorkshire
- Leeds, West Yorkshire
- London
- Sheffield, South Yorkshire
- Sunderland, Tyne and Wear

== United States ==
- Austin, Texas
- Atlanta, Georgia (metropolitan area)
- Birmingham, Alabama
- Boston, Massachusetts
- Charlotte, North Carolina
- Chicago, Illinois (metropolitan area)
- Cincinnati, Ohio (metropolitan area)
- Dallas, Texas (metropolitan area)
- Denver, Colorado (metropolitan area)
- Harrisburg, Lancaster, and York, Pennsylvania
- Houston, Texas
- Jacksonville, Florida (metropolitan area)
- Kansas City, Missouri (metropolitan area)
- Kirkland, Washington
- Lansing, Michigan
- Los Angeles, California
- Minneapolis–St. Paul, Minnesota (metropolitan area)
- New York, New York
- Northern Virginia
- Oklahoma City, Oklahoma
- Philadelphia, Pennsylvania (metropolitan area)
- Phoenix, Arizona
- Pittsburgh, Pennsylvania
- St. Louis, Missouri
- San Diego, California
- San Francisco, California
- Seattle, Washington
- Tulsa, Oklahoma

== Elsewhere ==
- Campinas, São Paulo, Brazil
- Paris, France
- Singapore

== See also ==
- Lists of companies
