= List of companies based in Oklahoma City =

The following is a list of companies based in Oklahoma City, Oklahoma.

== Major companies based in Oklahoma City ==
- Expand Energy - Fortune 500 (163)
- Continental Resources (NYSE)
- Love's Travel Stops & Country Stores - Forbes Largest Private Companies (13)
- OG&E Energy - Fortune 1000 (523) and NYSE
- Paycom - Fortune 100 (2) (NYSE)
- SandRidge Energy (NYSE)

== Other companies based in Oklahoma City ==
- Ackerman McQueen Advertising
- American Fidelity Assurance
- Braum's Ice Cream Store & Restaurants
- CMI Roadbuilding, Inc.
- Crowe & Dunlevy
- Digital Designs
- Feed the Children
- Globe Insurance Company
- Griffin Communications
- Hobby Lobby
- MidFirst Bank
- Orange Leaf
- Oscium
- Skulls Unlimited International, Inc.
- Taco Mayo Restaurants
- Tinker Federal Credit Union
- Tyler Media Group

== Others with a significant presence ==
- AAR Defense Systems & Logistics (Regional Headquarters)
- AT&T - Fortune 500 (Regional Headquarters)
- Baker Hughes, Inc.
- Bank of America
- Ben E. Keith Company
- The Boeing Company
- Chase
- The Coca-Cola Company
- COX Enterprises - Fortune 500 (Regional Headquarters)
- Dell
- Devon Energy
- Ernst & Young
- Farmers Insurance
- General Electric
- Goodyear
- Grant Thornton
- The Hartford
- Hertz
- Hewlett-Packard
- Hitachi, Ltd.
- Johnson Controls
- KPMG
- Nestlé Purina PetCare
- Northrop Grumman
- Office Max
- Pratt & Whitney
- PricewaterhouseCoopers
- Remy International
- Seagate Technology
- Southwest Airlines
- State Farm Insurance
- U.S. Cellular
- UPS
- Verizon Wireless
- Williams-Sonoma, Inc.
- Xerox

== Defunct ==
- Anderson-Prichard Oil Corporation
- Dobson Cellular
- Home State Life Insurance Company
- Kerr-McGee
- Layton & Forsyth
- Penn Square Bank
- Ridley Motorcycle Company
- Rocketplane Limited, Inc.
