= List of companies in Charlotte =

This is a list of major companies and organizations in the Charlotte metropolitan area, through corporate or subsidiary headquarters or through significant operational and employment presence in and around the American city of Charlotte, North Carolina.

== Fortune 1000 companies headquartered in the region ==
Name	Fortune 1000 rank	Industry	Stock symbol
Bank of America	18	Banking	NYSE: BAC
Lowe's	49	Retail	NYSE: LOW
Honeywell	114	Conglomerate	Nasdaq: HON
Nucor	124	Steel	NYSE: NUE
Truist	132	Banking	NYSE: TFC
Duke Energy	148	Energy	NYSE: DUK
Sonic Automotive	296	Automotive retail	NYSE: SAH
Albemarle Corporation	412	Chemicals	NYSE: ALB
Domtar	502	Pulp and paper	N/A (private)
CommScope	503	Telecommunications	Nasdaq: COMM
Ingersoll Rand	514	Machines	NYSE: IR
Coca-Cola Consolidated	532	Food processing	Nasdaq: COKE
Sealed Air	603	Packaging	NYSE: SEE
Jeld-Wen	678	Building material	NYSE: JELD
Brighthouse Financial	734	Insurance	Nasdaq: BHF
Dentsply Sirona	751	Dental equipment	Nasdaq: XRAY
RXO	760	Transportation	NYSE: RXO
Curtiss-Wright	919	Aerospace	NYSE: CW

== Notable companies with significant presence in the region ==
- 704Games
- AEBN
- Albemarle Corporation
- Amazon
- American Airlines
- American City Business Journals
- American Spirit Media
- Archway Cookies
- The Art Institutes
- Atrium Health
- Babcock & Wilcox
- Baja Broadband
- Baker & Taylor
- Balfour Beatty
- Bank of America
- Barings
- Belk
- Bojangles' Famous Chicken 'n Biscuits
- Bowles Hollowell Connor & Co.
- Boxman Studios
- Carlisle Companies
- Carolina Foods
- Carolina Weekly Newspaper Group
- Cato Corporation
- Centene Corporation
- CertusBank
- Charlotte Research Institute
- Charter Communications
- Chip Ganassi Racing
- Coca-Cola Bottling Co. Consolidated
- Commercial National Bank
- CommunityOne Bank
- Compass Group
- Consolidated Theatres
- Continental AG
- Crowder Construction Company
- Dale Earnhardt, Inc.
- Deep Elm Records
- DeVry University
- Dimensional Fund Advisors
- Dixon Hughes Goodman
- Dole Food Company
- Dollar Tree
- Domtar
- Duke Energy
- EchoPark Automotive
- ECPI University
- EnPro Industries
- Environmental Performance Vehicles
- ESPNU
- Eurest Support Services
- Extended Stay America
- FairPoint Communications
- Fifth Third Bank
- First Union (bought by Wells Fargo)
- Fontaine Modifications
- Food Lion
- Ginn Racing
- GPS Air
- Harris Teeter
- HDG International Group
- Hendrick Motorsports
- Herzog-Jackson Motorsports
- Honeywell
- Horizon Lines
- Information Age Publishing
- Ingersoll Rand
- The Inspiration Networks
- ITT Technical Institute
- Ivey's
- Joe Gibbs Racing
- JR Motorsports
- Krispy Kreme
- Lance Inc.
- LendingTree
- Lowe's
- LPL Financial
- MAACO
- Meineke Car Care Center
- MetLife
- Microsoft
- NASCAR Inc.
- National Gypsum
- National Junior College Athletic Association
- NationsBank (renamed as Bank of America)
- North Carolina Research Campus
- Novant Health
- Nucor
- Pamlico Capital
- Petro Express
- Pokertek
- Rack Room Shoes
- Red Ventures
- Richard Petty Motorsports
- Rusty Wallace Racing
- Scientigo
- Sealed Air
- SEC Network
- Showmars
- Shutterfly
- Six Flags
- Snyder's-Lance
- Sonic Automotive
- Southern Professional Hockey League
- Speed
- Speedway Motorsports
- SPX Corporation
- Strayer University
- TD Bank
- TIAA
- Time Warner Cable
- Trail Motorsport
- Truist Financial
- TTX Company
- UAV Corporation
- US Airways
- UTC Aerospace Systems
- Vanguard
- Verbatim Corporation
- Wells Fargo
- Wheresville Records
- WORX
- Wyndham Capital Mortgage

== See also ==
- Economy of North Carolina
- List of North Carolina companies
