= Penn Valley Redevelopment Project =

Coordinates: 39.0648°N 94.5938°W

The Penn Valley Redevelopment Project was a 1971 plan to demolish homes in Kansas City’s Valentine Neighborhood and to replace them with a multimillion-dollar office and residential complex.

== The plan ==
The project plan used Missouri’s Chapter 353 Urban Redevelopment Corporations Law. The law allows “the right to acquire by the exercise of the power of eminent domain any real property in the redevelopment area” (Section 353.130) and the property “shall not be subject to assessment or payment of general ad valorem (property) taxes imposed by the cities affected by this law, or by the state or any political subdivision thereof, for a period not in excess of ten years” (Section 353.110). The case was presented to the Kansas City City Plan Commission on April 1, 1971 and was unanimously defeated despite approval by the city staff. However, the plan continued to affect the Valentine Neighborhood.

The application was submitted by the Penn Valley Redevelopment Corporation. This corporation was organized by the Kansas City Life Insurance Company and other members of the Broadway Area (Business) Association. The president was Donald L. Thompson who was also Financial Vice-president at Kansas City Life.

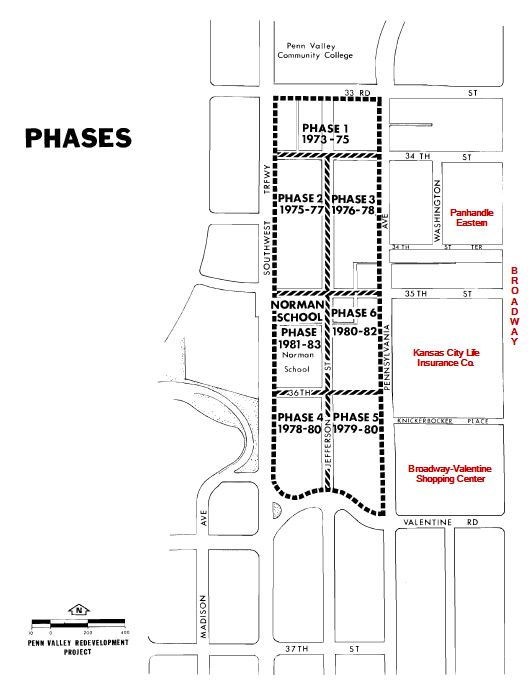
Map depicting the locations and timelines for the Penn Valley Redevelopment Project Phases. City of Kansas City, Mo. City Planning and Development Department.

The plan included seven stages or phases:

1. (1973–75) High-rise office building of 10 to 14 stories containing 210,000 to 270,000 square feet
2. (1975–77) Office building of two to six floors containing 60,000 to 100,000 square feet
3. (1976–78) Office building of two to eight floors and 60,000 to 140,000 square feet. Two apartment buildings; two to five floors with 25–60 units, two to four floors with 30–50 units
4. (1978–80) High-rise office building of eight to 24 floors with 160,000 to 360,000 square feet
5. (1979–80) Office building of two to six floors and 50,000 to 100,000 square feet
6. (1980–82) Two apartment buildings; two to eight floors with 30–100 units, two to four floors with 30–70 units
7. (1981–83) If the School Board agreed to sell Norman School before January 1, 1980: two apartment buildings; two to four floors with 30–50 units, two to eight floors with 30–90 units

== Conflict ==
Opposition to the plan led to the creation of the Valentine Neighborhood Association (VNA) in early 1971. VNA’s first president, Joe Cigas, led the effort by residents to oppose the plan. He was supported by City Councilman Joseph Shaughnessy, Jr. and mayor-elect Dr. Charles B. Wheeler, Jr.

In a May 16, 1972 speech to employees of Kansas City Life, Administrative Vice President Walter E. Bixby, Jr. reflected on why they pursued the plan:

One of the prime factors involved is the fact that many of the structures in the neighborhood were built in 1910 – some even before that. Owners have not maintained many of these properties and there’s some very noticeable deterioration. When these structures were built, they really weren’t wired for air-conditioners, TV sets, electric blenders, etc... So in the mid-1960s, the Company determined that no one else was going to do anything in the area and decided it was our responsibility, not only to the community but for our own benefit as well, that we try to maintain a neighborhood with a pleasant atmosphere and environment. We began acquiring properties in the neighborhood, particularly toward the late 1960s, from people who wished to sell their property to move. We have not attempted to buy them in any orderly pattern. They are scattered throughout the neighborhood. The reason was quite simple: We had no immediate plans but did want to try to either maintain the property or remove badly deteriorated housing.

Bixby also mentioned that he believed the creation of Penn Valley Community College in 1969 foreshadowed that the area would become more commercial. He compared 1951, 1961, and 1971. “In 1961, the picture shows more commercial properties in the neighborhood – Panhandle Eastern, Interstate Securities, the Broadway-Valentine Shopping Center.” He then said, “Now in 1971, we see the layout for the Penn Valley Junior College which is going to cause a large environmental change in the neighborhood.”

After the plan was defeated, Kansas City Life continued to buy properties in the area. Some were rented, others demolished. On September 7, 1972, a lawsuit was filed by Cigas and six others alleging that Kansas City Life perpetrated a scheme of buying property and allowing them to deteriorate and then demolishing them leaving vacant spaces throughout the area. The suit further charged that Kansas City Life falsely stated that the Valentine neighborhood was a blighted, unsanitary, crime-ridden, deteriorated area and as a result, homeowners were unable to use their property as security for mortgage loans. The court ruled in favor of Kansas City Life, and the ruling was upheld on appeal. The court cited precedence that the “defendant had the absolute right to the reasonable use of its own property” and that no evidence was presented that Kansas City Life encouraged abuse by tenants.

== The 1980s ==
On April 16, 1983, 10 Valentine residents created a partnership called The Jefferson Group. The group competed with Kansas City Life to buy homes in the area and resell them.

In 1984, Miller Nichols, Chairman of the J.C. Nichols Company, commented that he saw a need for more executive homes in the midtown Kansas City area because of plans by several developers to construct office space. Despite the fact that the Penn Valley plan was for offices and apartments, he referenced the conflict saying, "If Kansas City Life had been encouraged by the city and the city had been willing to work with them, we'd probably have 1,000 or 2,000 homes in there." He said, "I'd like to have the city fathers go to Kansas City Life and say, 'Look, we made a mistake.'" Joseph R. Bixby, President of Kansas City Life, built a large Spanish-style home at 3530 Pennsylvania, across from the Kansas City Life headquarters. One might speculate that it was a show home for such a plan, but it was actually built several years before Nichols' remarks.

== Since then ==
When the Valentine Neighborhood Association was created, the western boundary was Southwest Trafficway, the eastern boundary was Pennsylvania Avenue, the northern boundary was 33rd Street and the southern boundary was Valentine Road. The VNA has since expanded its eastern boundary to Broadway Blvd, and its northern boundary to 31st Street to include Penn Valley Community College. The southern boundary was expanded to 40th Street. The VNA successfully completed two initiatives to down-zone to single family. The first was south of Valentine Road in 1991. The second was for the area just north of Valentine Road in 2012. A Kansas City Life representative testified that they supported the north Valentine down-zoning.

Regarding the referenced commercial properties: The Interstate Securities building was razed to provide more parking for the Panhandle Eastern Building. Both the Panhandle Eastern Building (later bought by MGE) and the Broadway-Valentine Shopping Center (now called the Uptown Shoppes) began redevelopment projects in 2019 to convert them to mixed-use residential and small retail.

Kansas City Life continued to purchase properties with “no immediate plans.” They demolished buildings from July–August, 2020 when they took down the historic Knickerbocker Apartments. In October, 2024, they began a massive effort to demolish 23 buildings in the area from 33rd Street to 35th Street and Pennsylvania Avenue to the Southwest Trafficway. On October 28, 2024, the Valentine Neighborhood Association held a memorial service for the homes slated for demolition. Protests continued during the following days and signs were placed in yards stating “Vacant lots don’t house people, Stop KC Life Insurance” and “KC Life Insurance Kills Homes.” Kansas City Life responded by issuing the statement, “As long-standing members of the Midtown neighborhood, we are proactively removing vacant and non-viable buildings from our property. These vacant structures pose a risk to the overall safety and security to the neighborhood. We recognize the age of these buildings, but unfortunately, time and circumstance have taken their toll. Our goal in the coming weeks is to remove these structures with minimal disruption to the neighborhood. We are laying the groundwork to eventually redevelop this property in a manner that meets the needs of our city.” Residents of the area point out that most of the structures had renters until a few months prior to the demolition.

== Gallery ==
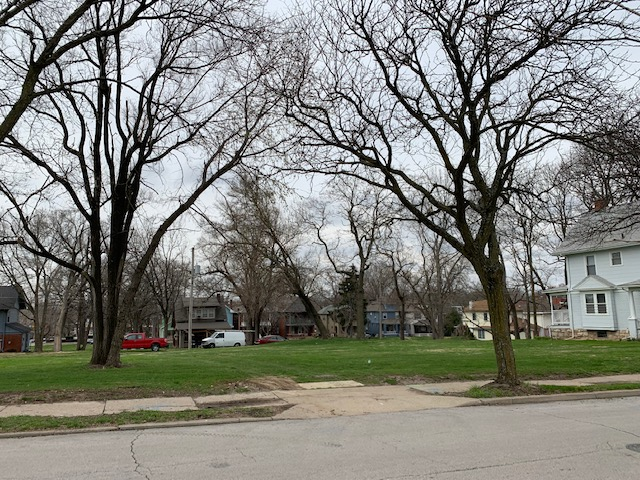
Empty Lots created in the Valentine Neighborhood due to demolition of homes by Kansas City Life.

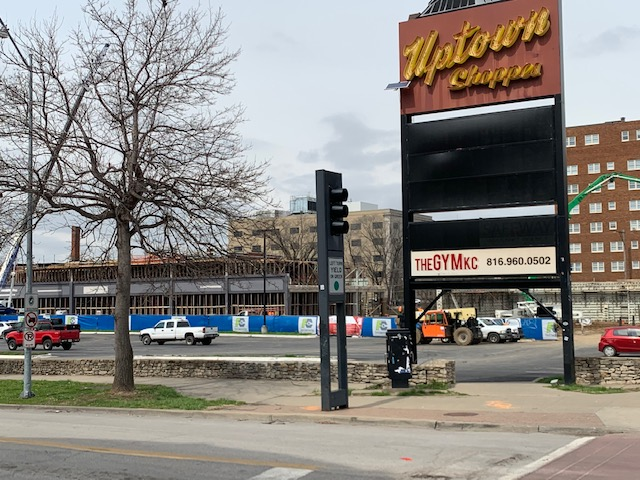
Redevelopment of the Uptowne Shoppes from commercial to retail and residential.

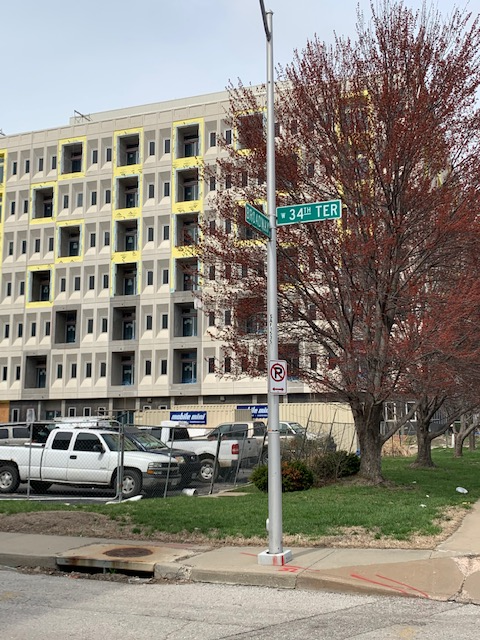
Redevelopment of the MGE (formerly Panhandle Eastern) building from commercial to residential.

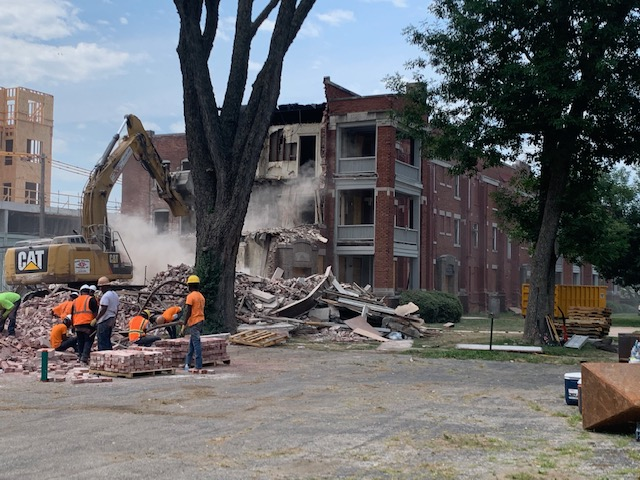
Demolition of the historic Knickerbocker Apartments, July 2020

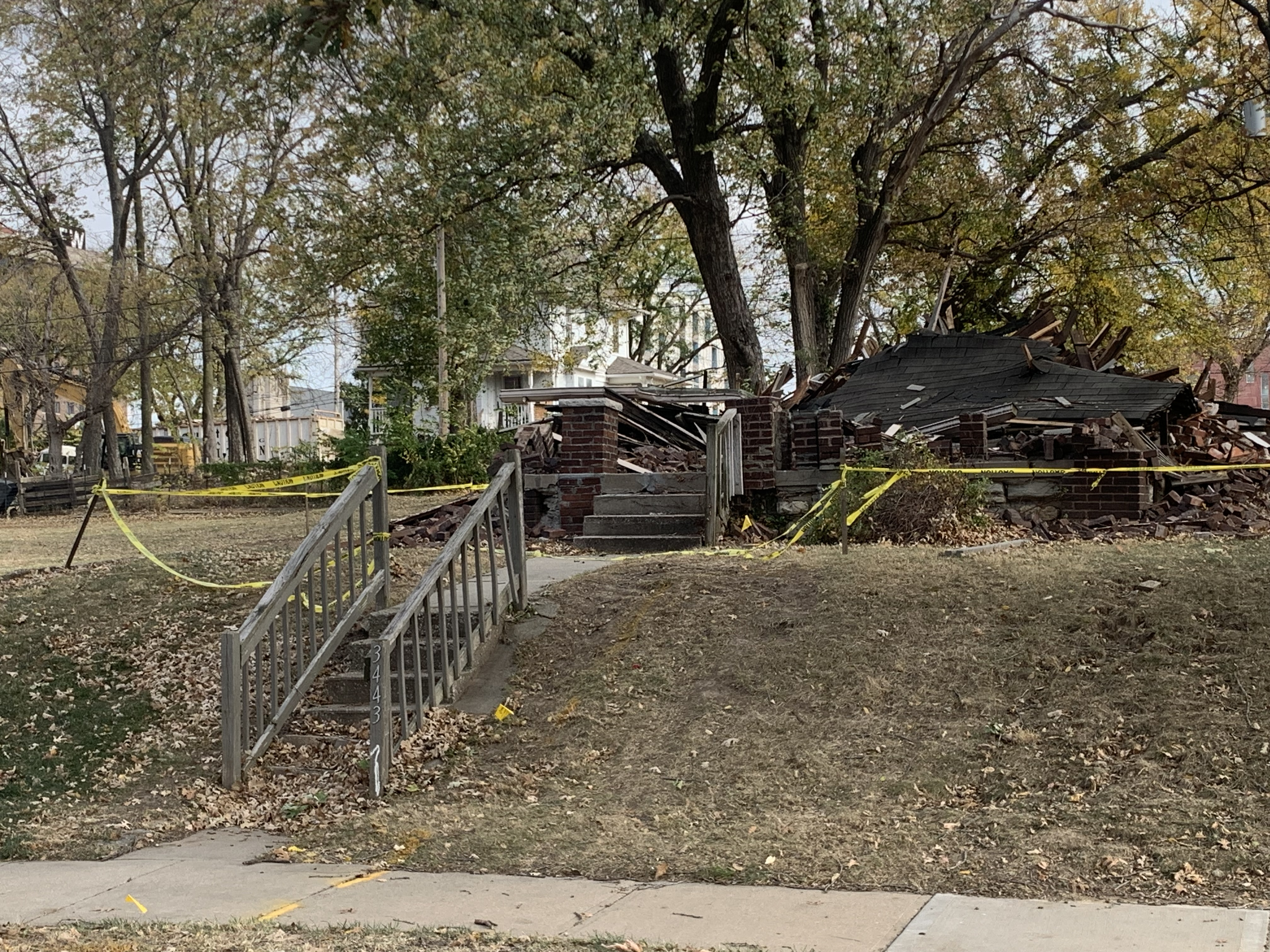
Demolition of a home by Kansas City Life Insurance, October, 2024.
