= Vivax =

Vivax, a Latin adjective meaning tenacious of life, long-lived, vivacious, venerable, may refer to:

- Vivax (company), one of Brazil's largest cable companies operating in Campinas
- Vivax (trademark), a Sony trademark

== Other use ==
- Phyllostachys vivax, a bamboo species also known as Chinese Timber Bamboo
- Plasmodium vivax, a malaria pathogen
