= Lil Miss Hot Mess =

American drag queen and writer

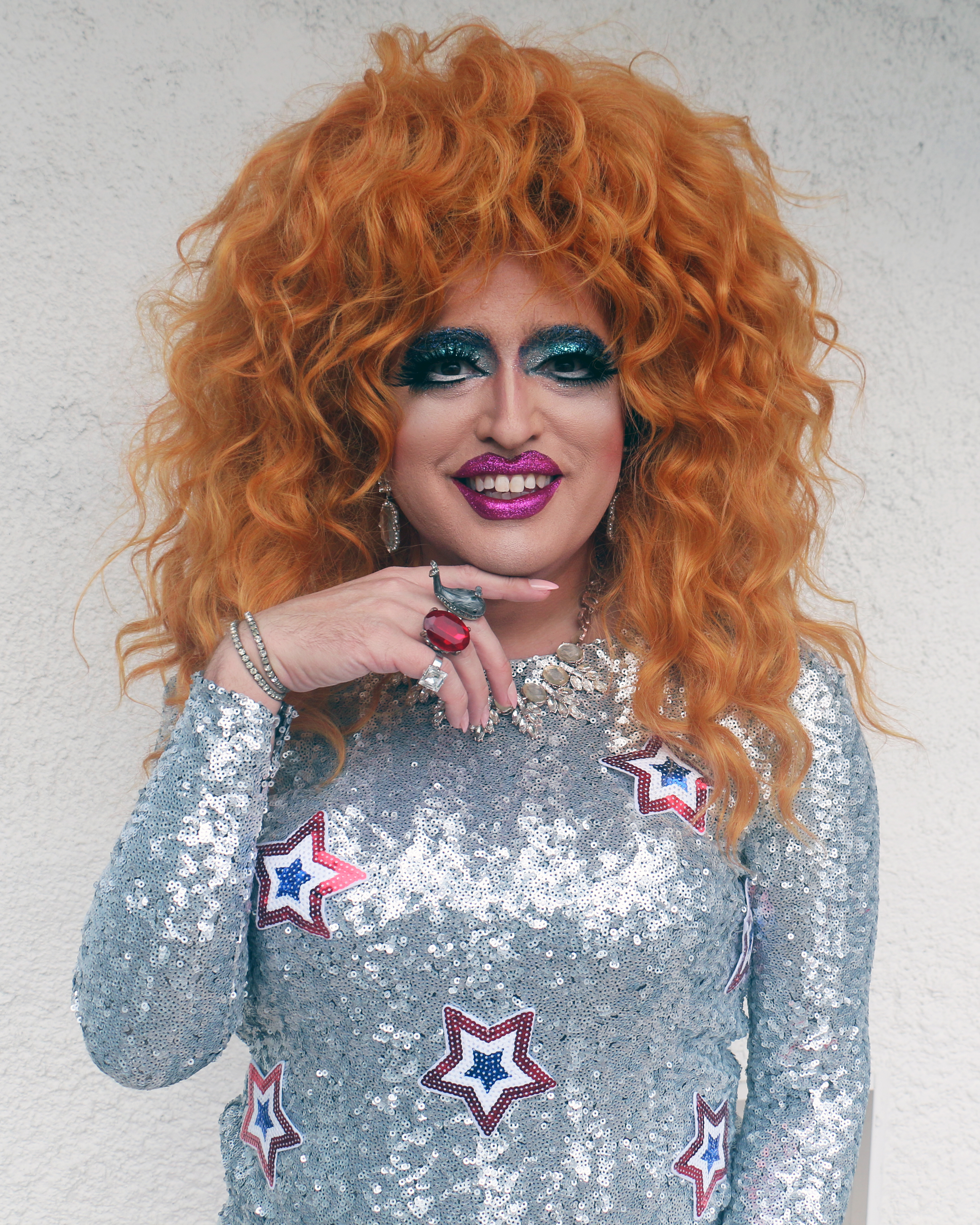
- Lil Miss Hot Mess headshot
- Occupations: drag queen, professor
- Known for: drag activism, Drag Queen Story Hour
- Notable work: The Hips on the Drag Queen Go Swish, Swish, Swish; If You're a Drag Queen and You Know It
- Website: www.lilmisshotmess.com

Lil Miss Hot Mess (born c. 1984) is an American drag queen, activist, and children's book author, known for her work with the #MyNameIs campaign and Drag Queen Story Hour.

== Early life and career ==
Lil Miss Hot Mess was raised Reform Jewish and had a Bar Mitzvah. She began performing in San Francisco in 2008 at The Stud. In 2010, at the age of 26, she threw herself a "Bat Mitzvah x2" and later that year won the inaugural title of Tiara Sensation, hosted by Club Some Thing.

In 2014, Lil Miss Hot Mess co-founded the #MyNameIs campaign alongside other drag performers (including as Sister Roma and Alex U. Inn), as well as LGBTQ and BIPOC activists, sexual violence survivors, and privacy advocates to protest Facebook's real-name policy. The group met with and protested Facebook leadership, claiming that the platform prevented users from being their authentic selves and maintaining their privacy. In a piece for Salon, Lil Miss Hot Mess wrote:

Facebook imagines itself as a community, but its names policy fails to acknowledge how diverse people experience their everyday lives ... And for many of us who are already on the margins, being able to make these virtual connections—outside regular social structures and where we live—can deeply change our lives ... And if we want a space to be truly authentic accountable to one another, it’s our responsibility to demand that Facebook be accountable to us as well.

In 2017, Lil Miss Hot Mess appeared on Saturday Night Live as a backup dancer for Katy Perry, with a group of drag and ballroom performers including Indya Moore, Brita Filter, Scarlet Envy, and Vivacious.

Lil Miss Hot Mess also appeared in a 2020 Biden-Harris campaign video to the tune of "America the Beautiful."

Outside of her drag career, Lil Miss Hot Mess is a university professor, and she holds a PhD from NYU. She has published in academic journals on subjects like “drag pedagogy” and digital drag performance.

=== Drag Queen Story Hour ===
In 2016, Lil Miss Hot Mess became involved for Drag Queen Story Hour as one of the first queens to read for the group in New York City. She has since performed Drag Queen Story Hour readings at venues like the Brooklyn Public Library, Institute for Contemporary Arts Los Angeles, and HBO’s Human By Orientation digital platform.

In 2020, she published a children’s book called The Hips on the Drag Queen Go Swish, Swish, Swish, illustrated by Olga de Dios and published by Running Press Kids. The book received positive reviews, including Kirkus Reviews, which described it as “a fun, movement-filled, family-friendly celebration of drag.” In an interview, Lil Miss Hot Mess described her goal behind writing the book as:

The book grew out of my work with Drag Queen Story Hour ... There’s no “Drag 101,” but it gets them swishing and shimmying and twirling, so they can embody and celebrate some of the things queens do.

The Hips on the Drag Queen Go Swish, Swish, Swish was also featured as a favorite by Jesse Tyler Ferguson on The Ellen DeGeneres Show, as a book he likes to read to his son.

In 2021, Lil Miss Hot Mess read The Hips on the Drag Queen Go Swish, Swish, Swish in a segment of the television show Let’s Learn, produced by New York City PBS affiliate WNET and the New York City Department of Education. The segment stirred controversy among right-wing groups that frequently target Drag Queen Story Hour, and who took issue with her suggestion that “I think we might have some drag queens in training on our hands.” PBS eventually took down the segment from its main website, however it is available on the local affiliate's YouTube channel.

In May 2022, as Drag Queen Story Hour came under increased attacks from conservatives, Senator Marco Rubio specifically criticized Lil Miss Hot Mess's Hips book referring to it as “sexually charged content.” In response, Lil Miss Hot Mess was outspoken in defending her work, describing these and similar remarks as “an attack not only on freedom of expression but on imagination,” and writing that, “if there is anything that drag performers and kids can learn from each other, it is to get in touch with one’s inner curiosity, conscience and creativity.”

Also in May 2022, Lil Miss Hot Mess published her second children's book If You’re a Drag Queen and You Know It.

In April 2024, Lil Miss Hot Mess led a Queer Storytime for Palestine in Northampton, Massachusetts, and instructed the children to chant "Free Palestine", dress in Palestinian attire and waive the Palestinian flag and the transgender flag. Organizations such as StopAntisemitism raised concerns of indoctrination.
