= Economy of Kansas City =

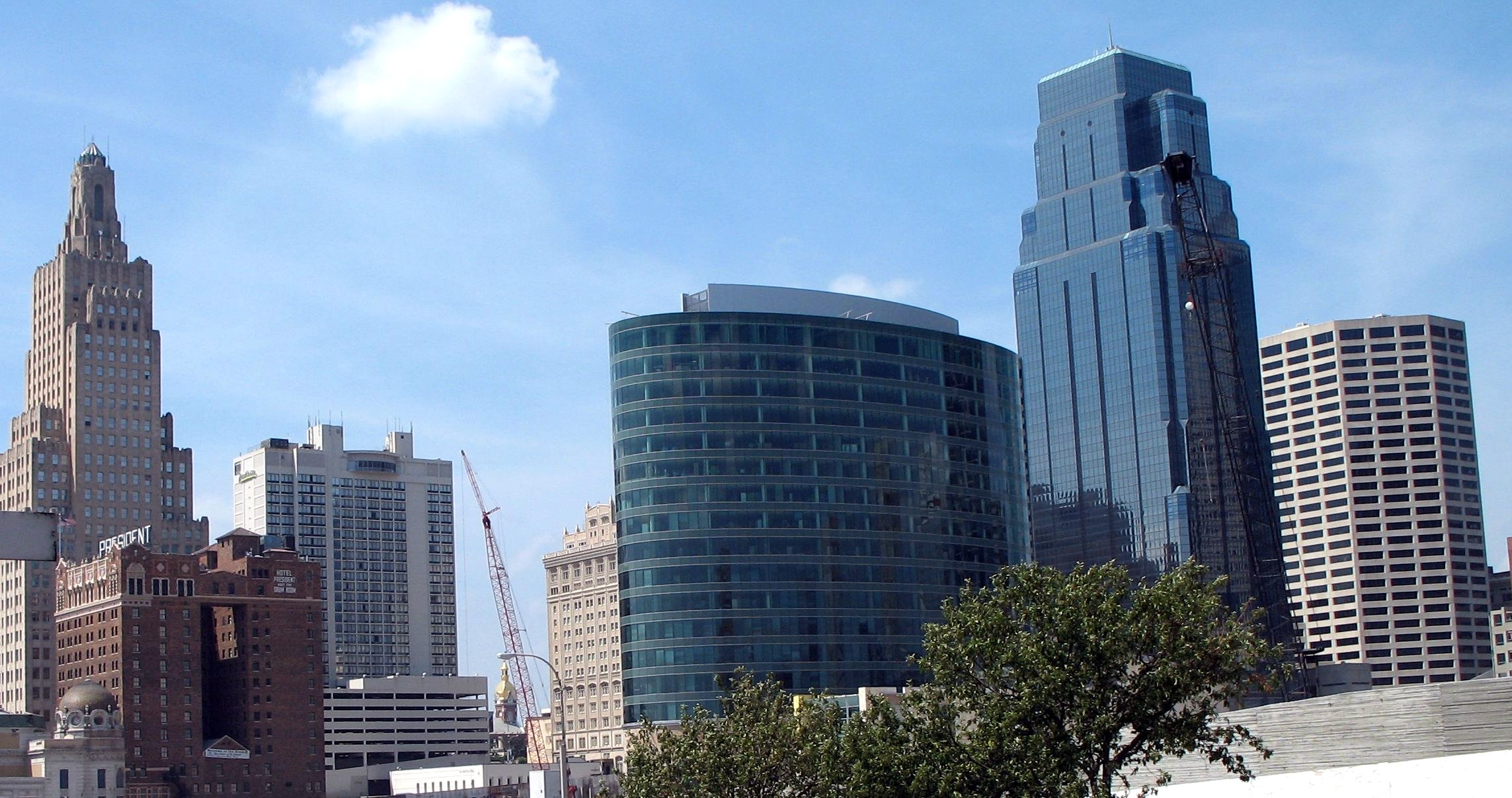
H&R Block's new oblong headquarters in downtown Kansas City

The economy of the Kansas City metropolitan area is anchored by Kansas City, Missouri, which is the most populous city in the state and the 37th largest in the United States. The Kansas City metropolitan area is the 27th largest in the United States, based on the United States Census Bureau's 2004 population estimates. The metro's economy is large and influential to its region.

== Companies and employers ==
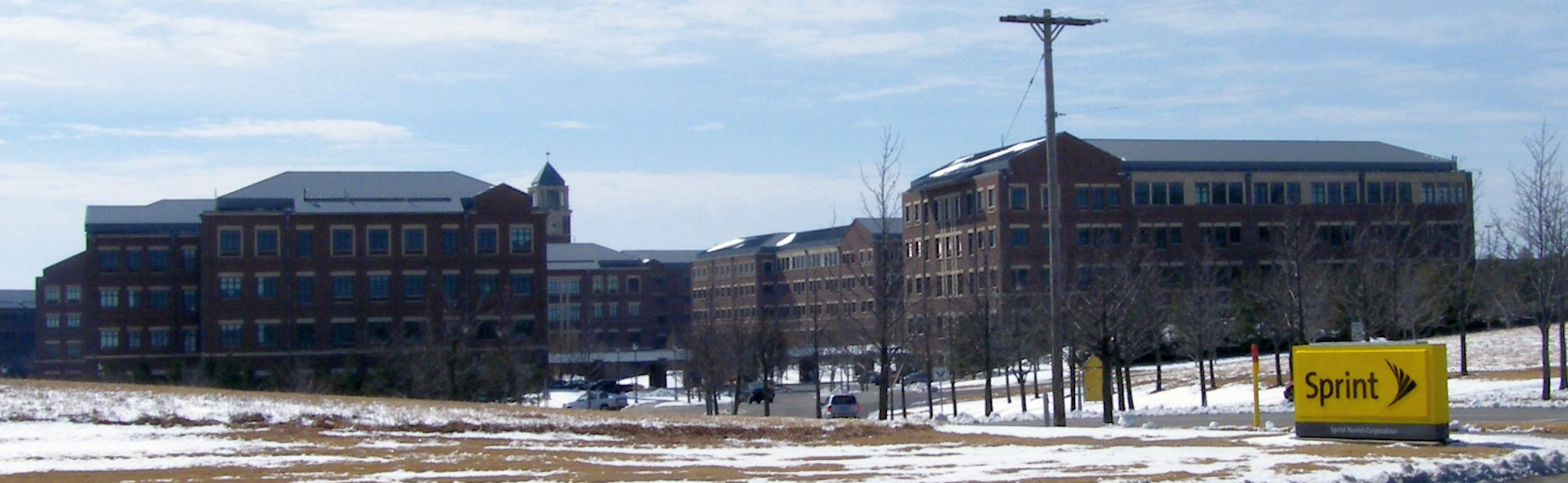
Former Sprint world headquarters campus, now T-Mobile US's second headquarters, designed by RMJM Hillier, in Overland Park

The Kansas City metro is the third largest beef-processing city in the US (behind Chicago and Cincinnati), and has the second largest rail network. The area has many factories, manufacturing plants, an official international trade zone, and the most foreign trade zone space in the nation. It has a number of large national and international companies, including these:

- American Century Investments, mutual fund manager and broker
- Associated Wholesale Grocers, grocery wholesale cooperative
- Barkley, Inc., nationally recognized advertising firm
- Bernstein-Rein, nationally recognized advertising firm
- Black & Veatch Corporation
- BNSF Railway Co., freight railroad network operator
- Burns & McDonnell Engineering
- Bushnell Corporation, manufacturer of outdoor products specializing in optics and imaging
- Cerner Corporation
- Commerce Bancshares, large bank operating in Kansas, Missouri, and Illinois
- Crayola, a division of Hallmark
- Dairy Farmers of America
- Embarq Corporation, large telecommunications company based in Overland Park; it was spun off from Sprint in 2006
- Evergy, electric and gas utility company
- Federal Reserve Bank of Kansas City
- Garmin, develops consumer, aviation, and marine technologies for GPS
- Hallmark Cards, largest greeting card manufacturer in the world (Although Hallmark's gross revenues would generally be more than sufficient for inclusion in the Fortune 500 and 1000, those lists only apply to public companies. Hallmark is privately held by the Hall family and is thus ineligible for inclusion on the Fortune 500 or 1000.)
- HCA Midwest Health, for-profit hospital system
- HNTB, global infrastructure planning, engineering, and consulting firm
- H&R Block, tax preparation services
- Interstate Bakeries, maker of Wonder Bread, Twinkies, and other products
- JE Dunn Construction, general contractor
- Kansas City Life Insurance, major national insurer
- Kansas City Southern Industries, railway management
- Lockton, insurance brokerage and consulting firm
- Netsmart, health care IT provider
- North American Savings Bank, financial institution
- Polsinelli, law firm
- Populous (company), architectural
- Russell Stover Candies, currently under purchase by Swiss-based company Lindt
- T-Mobile US, one of the largest telecommunications companies in the world; prior to its merger with T-Mobile, Sprint Corporation had its world headquarters in Overland Park.
- VMLY&R, marketing and communications company
- Wish-Bone salad dressing
- YRC Worldwide, one of the largest transportation and logistics companies in the world; based in Overland Park

Other major regional and national non-corporate employers headquartered and/or located in Kansas City include:

- Shook, Hardy & Bacon, major national and international law firm
- University of Missouri - Kansas City, full branch of the University of Missouri

== Products ==
- Ford trucks, including the F-150 and Transit, manufactured at the Ford Kansas City Assembly Plant in Claycomo
- Bon Ami cleaning powder, produced by Faultless Starch/Bon Ami Company of Kansas City
- Chevrolet Malibu and Buick LaCrosse, manufactured at the General Motors Fairfax Assembly Plant in Fairfax, Kansas City
- Dawn dishwashing detergent, manufactured by Procter & Gamble in Kansas City

== Federal government ==
The federal government is the largest employer in Kansas City. In the wider metropolitan area, the federal government, either directly or through contracts, employs 41,500 people. The combined annual payroll of these jobs is more than $3 billion.

The largest federal agencies in the Kansas City area by number of permanent employees are these:

- Department of Defense - 15,294
- Department of Veterans Affairs - 2,740
- Department of Treasury (primarily the IRS) - 2,707
- Social Security Administration - 1,708
- Department of Agriculture - 1,451
- Department of Homeland Security - 1,230
- Department of Justice - 1,210
- Department of Transportation - 1,048
- General Services Administration - 883
- Environmental Protection Agency - 540

The U.S. Postal Service employs more than 6,000 in the Kansas City area. Postal jobs are often counted separately from other federal jobs, because these positions are generally in the excepted service. Employees in these positions cannot earn competitive status or reinstatement rights for traditional federal employment.

== Business publications ==
Kansas City has many business publications. Two of the most prominent are the Kansas City Business Journal (weekly), and Ingram's Magazine (monthly). Many of Kansas City's business scions also frequently appear in the Independent, the local society magazine (weekly), and KC Business Magazine (monthly).
