= The Wheresville Project =

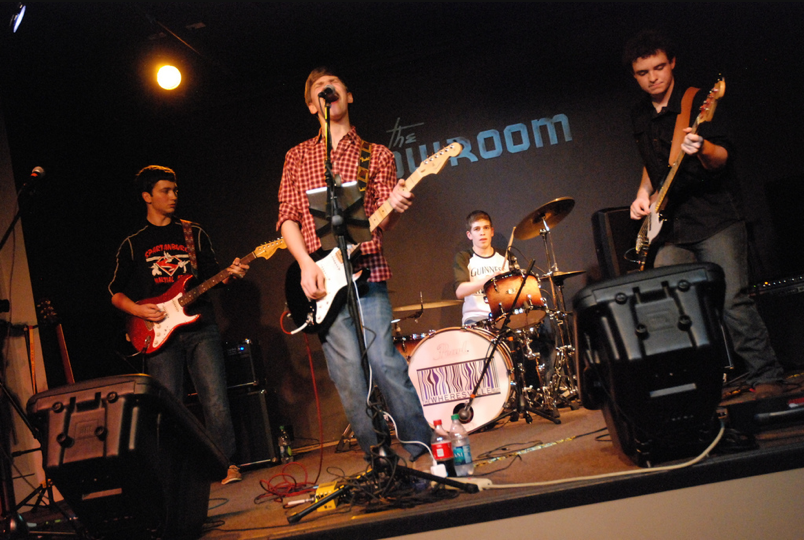
- The Wheresville Project performing live at The Showroom in Spartanburg, South Carolina

Background information
- Origin: Spartanburg, South Carolina, USA
- Genres: Blues, Rock, Funk
- Years active: 2010–2013
- Past members: Brian Steinberg; Joseph Boscia; Hunter Mulkey; Ben Lewson
- Website: thewheresvilleproject.com

The Wheresville Project was an American rock 'n' roll band based out of Spartanburg, South Carolina. Their musical backgrounds are a unique blend of classic and southern rock, blues, and funk. The band consists of Brian Steinberg (vocals, rhythm guitar), Joseph Boscia (lead guitar), Hunter Mulkey (bass), Ben Lewson (drums).

== History ==
The Wheresville Project members met in Spartanburg and originally performed as Simple Paradox until the spring of 2010 when the band's name was changed to The Wheresville Project, after Mark Miller's Wheresville Records in South Carolina. In September 2011, the band won Hub Bub's Next Big Thing Talent Competition in Spartanburg, putting themselves at the top of Spartanburg's music scene. After gaining popularity and notoriety in the Spartanburg area, the group began performing at larger venues and festivals across the southeast . During the summer of 2012, the band worked with producer and former bassist for The Marshall Tucker Band, Tim Lawter, on their debut album Four Years and Cities. The album was released on August 16, 2012, and has been well received by critics and the public alike. The group disbanded in 2013 and all four members are currently enrolled in colleges throughout the southeast.

== Discography ==
- EP (2011)

1. Sinner
2. Check Please
3. Bad and Moody
4. Right Stuff at the Right Time

- Four Years and Cities (2012)

1. Kicks
2. Got No One to Dance With
3. Staircase
4. Elizabeth
5. Sinner
6. Right Stuff at the Right Time
7. Lay Down and Die
8. Ain't Worth My Time
9. Check Please
10. Rumor Mill
11. Bad and Moody
12.Four Years and Cities
