= Knickerbocker Apartments =

Knickerbocker Apartments may refer to:

- Knickerbocker Apartments (Kansas City, Missouri), listed on the National Register of Historic Places (NRHP)
- The Knickerbocker Apartments (Memphis, Tennessee), listed on the NRHP in Shelby County, Tennessee
