= Economy of St. Louis =

The economy of St. Louis itself is relatively small; most of the area's GDP and office space is based in nearby St. Louis County.

== Sectors and employment ==
The 2019 Gross Domestic Product (GDP) of St. Louis was $152.4 billion. That makes St. Louis the 22nd-highest GDP in the United States. According to the 2017 Economic Census, manufacturing in the St. Louis, MO-IL metro area conducted $53.3 billion in business, followed by the retail trade with $51.3 billion; the healthcare and social service industry with $22.5 billion; and professional, scientific, and technical services with $15.1 billion. The sector employing the largest number of workers in the area was healthcare with 199,463 workers, followed by retail with 142,553 workers, food service with 130,628 workers, administrative and support jobs with 107,862 workers, and manufacturing with 107,501 workers. As of July 2013, the city of St. Louis had 143,147 workers in its labor force with 127,687 employed, 15,460 unemployed, and an unemployment rate of 10.8 percent.

Unemployment in May 2014 fell 0.1% to 7.2%, nearly one percent above the national rate of 6.3% in that month.

The Swedish furniture retailer IKEA opened a 21-acre complex in the Central West End, including a 380,000 square foot store that added approximately 300 jobs. The company opened its new store on September 30, 2015.

The Mississippi River and Missouri River in St. Louis play a large role in moving goods, especially bulk commodities such as grain, coal, salt, and certain chemicals and petroleum products. In 2004, the Port of St. Louis was the third-largest inland port by tonnage in the country, and the 21st-largest of any sort. St. Louis is also the nation's third-largest railroad hub, moving everything from fertilizer, gravel, crushed stone, prepared foodstuffs, fats, oils, nonmetallic mineral products, grain, alcohol, and tobacco products to motorized vehicles and parts.

=== Health services and biomedical ===
Among St. Louis city healthcare employers is BJC HealthCare, which operates both Barnes-Jewish Hospital and St. Louis Children's Hospital. BJC also cooperates with Washington University School of Medicine, a center of medical research that is adjacent to Barnes-Jewish Hospital. Other major employers in the city include the Saint Louis University School of Medicine and Saint Louis University Hospital, another medical research facility and hospital, and Cardinal Glennon Children's Hospital.

== Companies ==
As of 2020, the St. Louis area is home to eight Fortune 500 companies: Centene, Emerson Electric, Reinsurance Group of America, Edward Jones Investments, Graybar Electric, Olin, Ameren, and Post Holdings.

Other companies include:

- Anheuser-Busch
- Arch Resources
- Belden
- Bunge Limited
- CyberTel Cellular
- Energizer Holdings
- Enterprise Holdings
- HOK
- Nestlé Purina PetCare
- Panera Bread
- Peabody Energy
- Stifel Financial
- Bayer CropScience/Monsanto
- World Wide Technology
