= Uptown Theater (Kansas City, Missouri) =

Historical building

Coordinates: 39°3′40″N 94°35′27″W

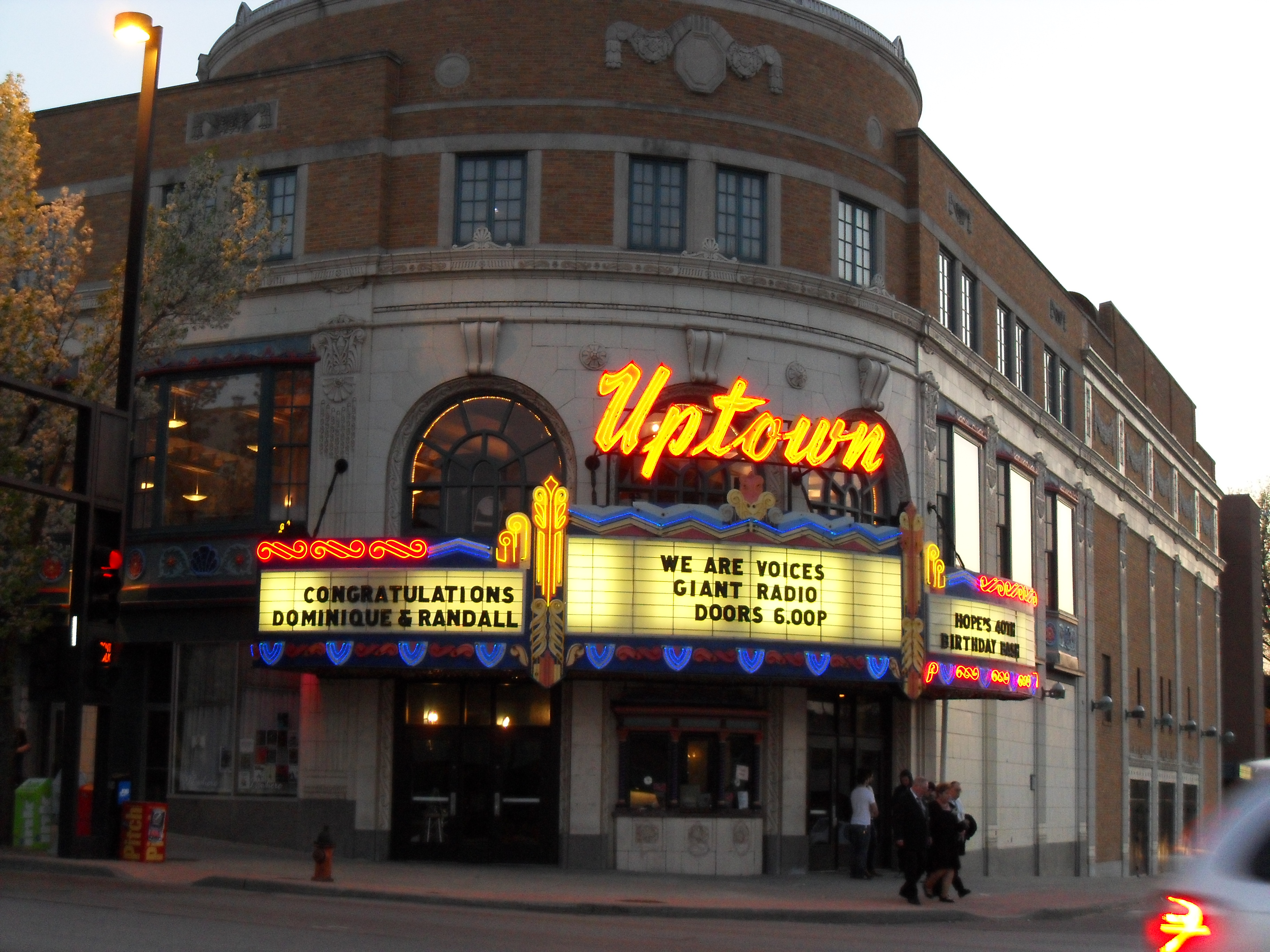
- Interactive map of Uptown Theater
- Address: 3700 Broadway Blvd; Kansas City, MO 64111-2506
- Location: Valentine
- Owner: UGA
- Operator: Mammoth
- Capacity: 2,400

Construction
- Groundbreaking: November 1926
- Opened: January 6, 1928; 98 years ago
- Renovated: 1941, 1994-98
- Closed: 1989-98
- Reopened: 1998
- Architects: John Eberson; Robert Gornall
- General contractor: Fleming-Gilchrist Construction
- Main contractor: Valentine Realty Company

Website
- uptowntheater.com
- Uptown Building and Theater
- U.S. National Register of Historic Places
- Architectural style: Renaissance
- NRHP reference No.: 79001374
- Added to NRHP: June 27, 1979

The Uptown Theater is a historic theater located in Kansas City, Missouri. The building was listed on the National Register of Historic Places in 1979 as the Uptown Building and Theater.

== History ==
The original design for the Uptown was carried out by Kansas City architect Robert Gornall. Construction first began on the portion of the Uptown that would house offices and shops along Broadway. This office and retail portion of the Uptown was completed in November 1926. Gornall's plans also called for a theater to extend along the rear portion of the building, with a tower at the north end to serve as an entrance and foyer. As the office and retail portion of the Uptown was nearing completion, the footing was also poured for the theater portion of the Uptown; however work was halted until the Universal Film Company acquired the unfinished building in 1927. Austrian-born designer John Eberson was hired to complete the construction of the Uptown and oversee the decoration of the interior. Kansas City-based Fleming-Gilchrist Construction Company served as the general contractor for both phases of the Uptown construction.

Eberson completed the design of the Uptown in Italian Renaissance style as an atmospheric theatre. It was among the few of its kind in Kansas City and in Missouri. The inside of the theater replicated an outdoor Mediterranean courtyard, complete with a nighttime sky ceiling with twinkling stars, clouds, and mechanical flying birds. The Uptown opened on January 6, 1928, to a film showing of The Irresistible Lover". The Uptown was the first theater in Kansas City outside of downtown to show first-run films.

In 1931, the Uptown copyrighted a Fragratone system, which funneled fragrances into the auditorium via the ventilation ducts at appropriate moments during films.

The Uptown hosted movies as well as live vaudeville and stage productions through the 1970s. By the late 1970s, the theater began to function primarily as a concert venue, and it remained that way until it closed in 1989 as a result of the owner failing to pay back taxes. During its later years, the interior had fallen into disrepair, and all of the original details were whitewashed.

== Redevelopment ==
Following the closure of the Uptown Theater in 1989, the property was transferred to the Land Trust of Jackson County. The Land Trust was a governmental corporation established by state law to sell properties to satisfy unpaid taxes. At that time, Larry Sells was president of the Land Trust, and he spent a few years trying unsuccessfully to sell the vacant theater to developers.

In 1994, Larry Sells resigned from the Land Trust and purchased the Uptown on his own with plans to restore the theater as well as the entire commercial corridor of Broadway between 38th Street and Armour Boulevard. Sells set up a corporation under the name UGA, LLC to complete the purchase for $7,500. Following the acquisition of the Uptown, a $15 million renovation of the theater was completed. The original splendor was restored in the details and colors of Eberson's original design. In addition, 33,000 sq ft (3,100 m^{2}) of new lobby, bar, office and banquet space was added. Because of the redevelopment, the Uptown remains one of the few remaining atmospheric theatres still in operation. Permanent seating remains in the balcony and rear half of the main floor. The front half of the floor nearest to the stage is now open for table arrangements and general admission standing for concerts.

== Reception ==
The Uptown is now ranked number 82 on the list of the top 100 theaters in the world by the concert industry magazine Pollstar.
