= Selmi =

Selmi is a surname. Notable people with the surname include:

- Ali Selmi, Tunisian football manager
- Ali El Selmi, Egyptian academic
- Djilali Selmi (1946–2025), Algerian footballer
- Francesco Selmi, Italian chemist
- Habib Selmi (born 1951), Tunisian author
- Housseyn Selmi (born 1993), Algerian footballer
- Luca Selmi, Italian electronic engineer
- Mustapha Kamel Selmi, Algerian sprinter
