= Ridley Motorcycle Company =

American motorcycle manufacturing company

- Type: Private
- Founded: 1997; 29 years ago
- Founders: Clay Ridley; Jay Ridley
- Defunct: 2010
- Fate: Bankruptcy liquidation

Ridley Motorcycle Company was a privately held motorcycle manufacturing company based in Oklahoma City, Oklahoma, US, from 1995 to 2010. Ridley introduced the first cruiser with a continuously variable transmission, the Ridley Speedster, in 1999, and positioned itself as "America's Automatic Motorcycle."

== Models ==
- Speedster - Ridley's first production vehicle, the Speedster was a 3/4 scale 600cc "miniature cruiser" fitted with a CVT transmission and V-twin engine.
- Auto-Glide Classic (formerly "Auto-Glide")
- Auto-Glide Chopper
- Auto-Glide Old School
- Auto-Glide Sport
- Auto-Glide Trike
- Auto-Glide TT
- X88 - Sold with a traditional manual transmission.

== History ==
Clay Ridley began experimenting with automatic transmissions in motorcycles in 1995, when building them for his sons as a hobby. Although the vast majority of cars and light trucks sold in the U.S. use automatic transmissions, no two-wheeled vehicles larger than a scooter did, and so to capitalize on that market, he and his son Jay founded the Ridley Motorcycle Company in 1997, which produced its first model, the Speedster, two years later.

Following the success of the Speedster, the company developed a full-size cruiser, name the Auto-Glide, which began sales in 2003, and steadily expanded its line. They sustained annual growth of over 30% from 2000 to 2008, and sold nearly 4,000 units through 2009.

Ridley's success was built on a focus of three unique features; low seat, light weight, and an automatic transmission. Ridley found a niche with new riders and female riders by offering the traditional styling of a big motorcycle, but with the ease of riding a scooter. By 2006, Ridley Motorcycles were sold through 55 dealers in the United States and four international dealers. The company entered the Canadian motorcycle market in 2007 with limited success in ten dealerships spread throughout the country.

As Ridley saw success with its larger Auto-Glide model, Harley-Davidson immediately sued Ridley over use of the name "Auto-Glide," claiming trademark infringement. The case was presented to the United States District Court for the Eastern District of Wisconsin in August 2007 in five days, but Ridley settled on December 28, 2009, after waiting three years with no verdict returned. On the following day, Ridley filed for Chapter 7 bankruptcy. A motion was filed just the day after on December 30, 2009, by MidFirst Bank, lender to Ridley in 2005 of an amount of $1 million, for the bankruptcy court to authorize the abandonment of the collateral given by Ridley to the bank. Ridley had already voluntarily surrendered its collateral to the bank on October 1, but the bankruptcy was filed before Midfirst Bank could organize an auction, scheduled for January 2010.

The assets of Ridley were sold at a public auction on February 16, 2010. Route 66 Ridley Motorcycles acquired the Ridley brand and its remaining $9 million parts inventory, manufacturing assets, and intellectual property.
