= Valentine, Kansas City =

Neighborhood of Kansas City, Missouri, U.S.

Coordinates: 39.063°N 94.593°W

Valentine is a historic neighborhood in Midtown Kansas City, Missouri. It is just north of the Westport entertainment district, bounded by Broadway on the east, Southwest Trafficway on the west, 31st Street on the north, and 40th Street on the south.

Most of the houses in Valentine were built in the early 1900s and include such styles as Shirtwaist, Arts and Crafts, Colonial Revival, Georgian Revival, and bungalow.

The Valentine Neighborhood Association was formed in 1971. The first president was Joe Cigas, for whom a street is named.

== Buildings on the National Register of Historic Places ==
Buildings on the National Register of Historic Places

- Ambassador Hotel Historic District - Listed February 17, 1983 (#83000995) 3600 Broadway
- Knickerbocker Apartments - Listed June 13, 2003 (#03000525) 501-535 Knickerbocker Place
- Norman School - Listed January 15, 2014 (#13001087) 3514 Jefferson St.
- Uptown Building and Theatre - Listed June 27, 1979 (#79001374) 3700-3712 Broadway
- Valentine on Broadway Hotel - Listed August 1, 2008 (#08000745) 3724 Broadway

== See also ==
- List of neighborhoods in Kansas City, Missouri
- Knickerbocker Apartments (Kansas City, Missouri)
- Uptown Theater (Kansas City, Missouri)
- Penn Valley Redevelopment Project

== Gallery ==
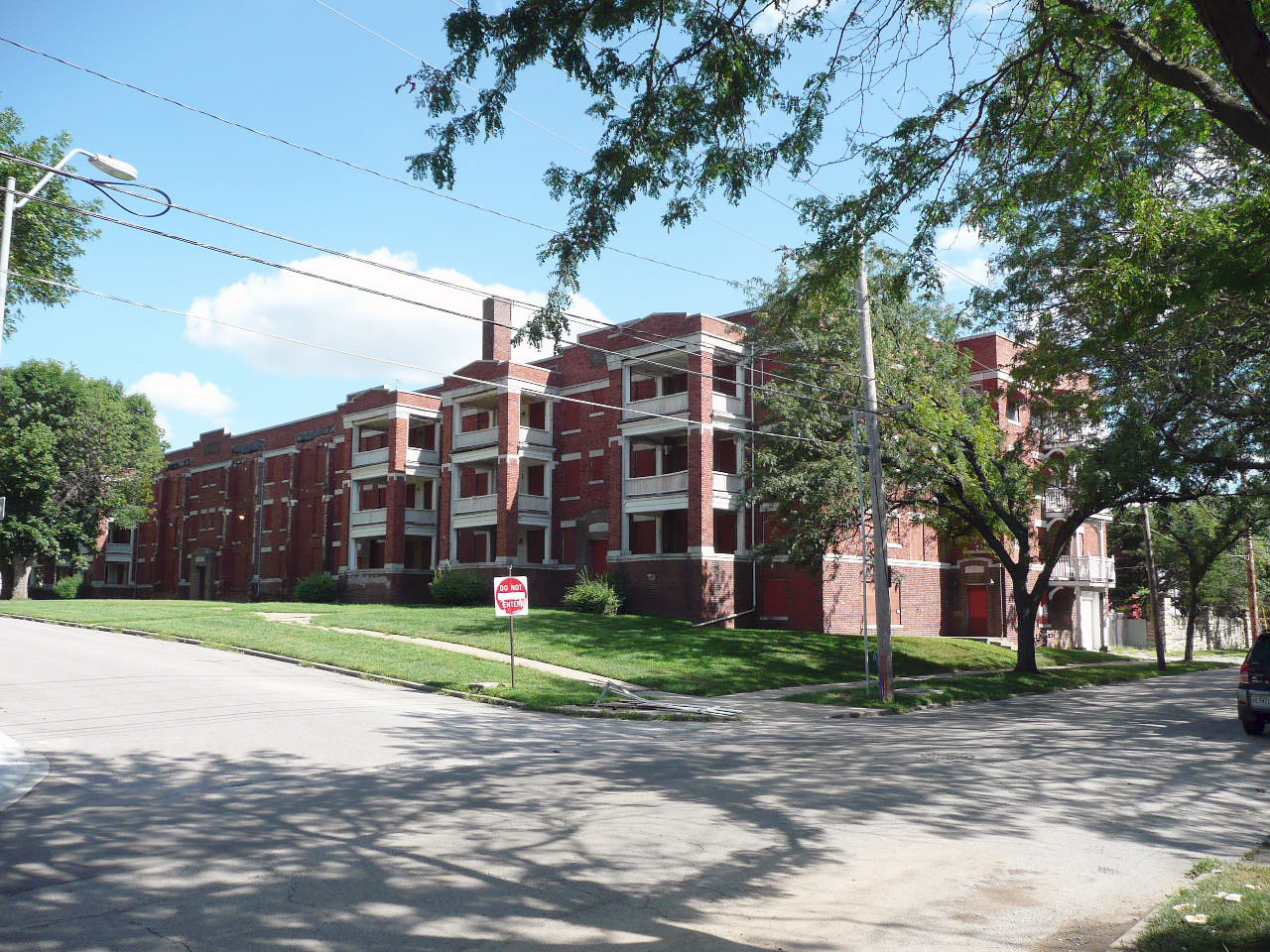
Knickerbocker Apartments

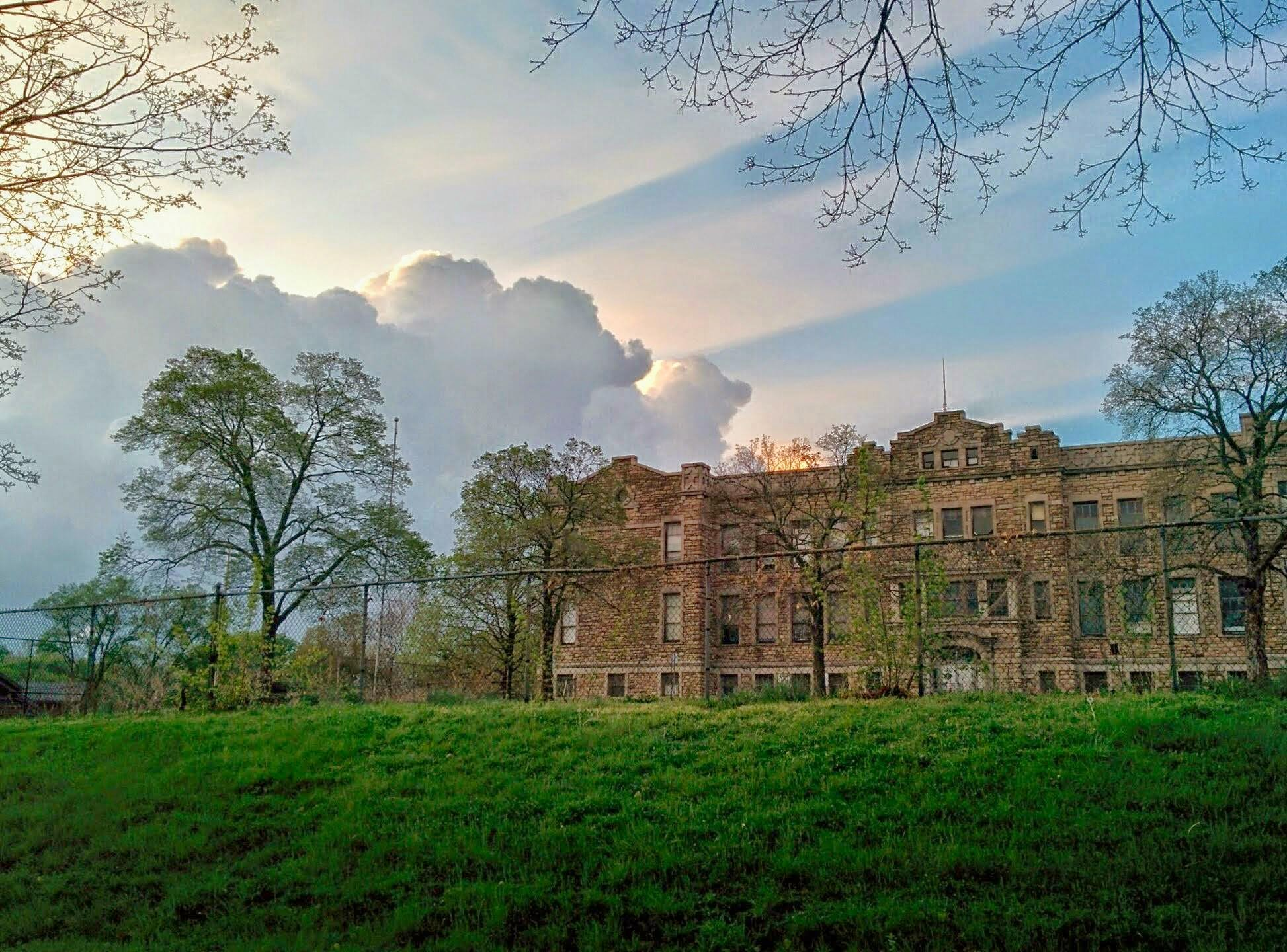
Norman School

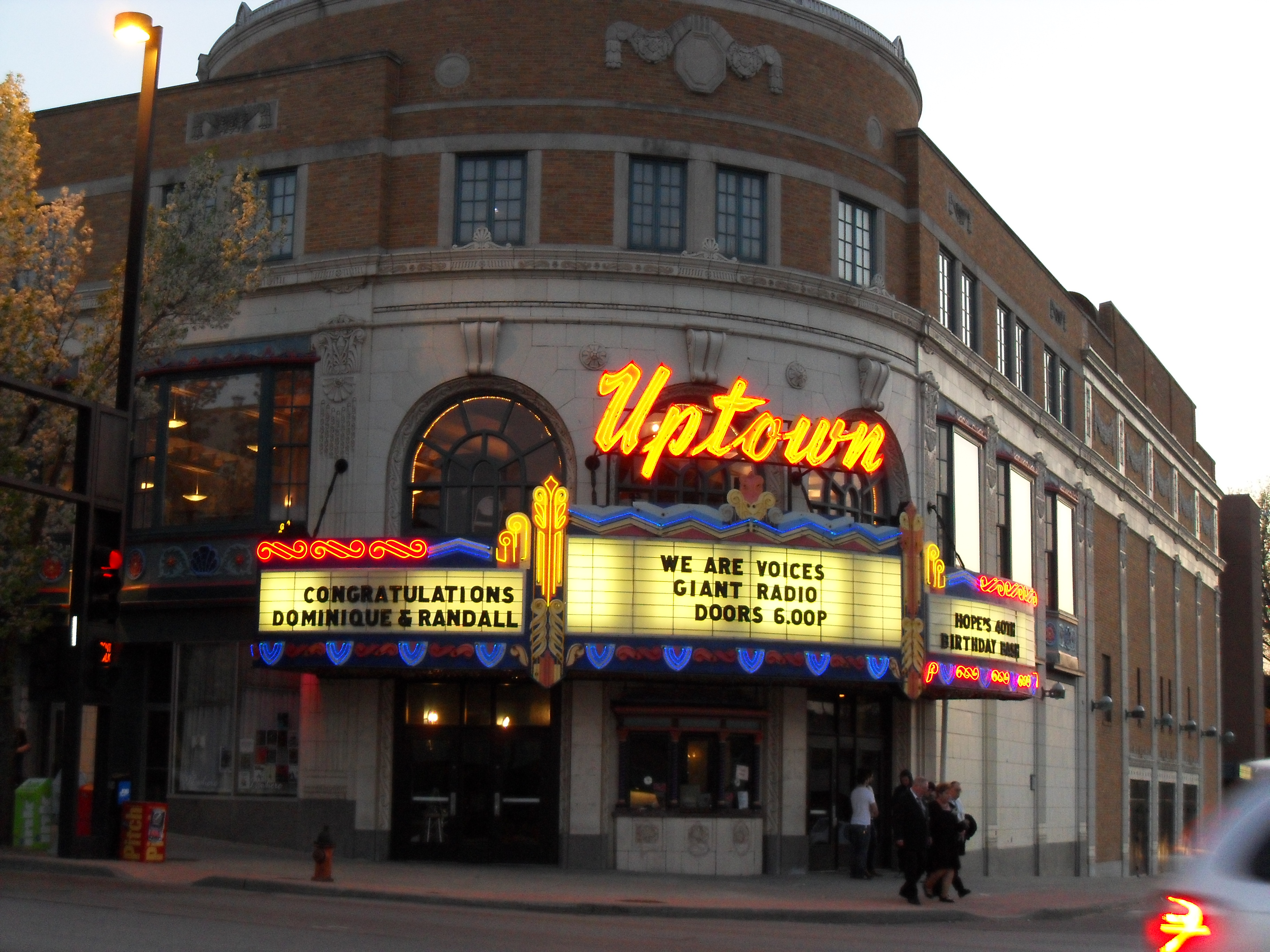
Uptown Theater

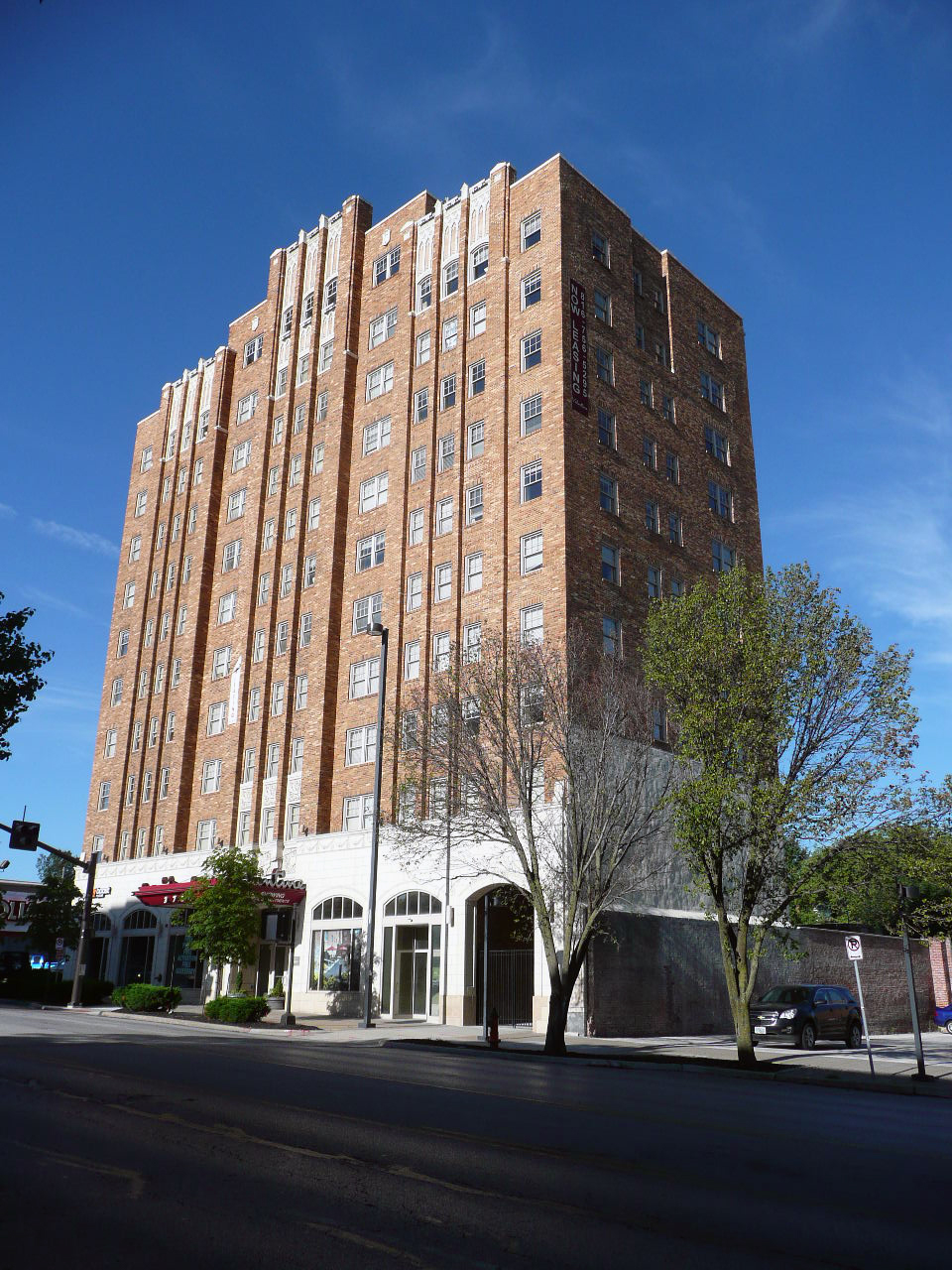
Valentine on Broadway Hotel
