= Knickerbocker Apartments (Kansas City, Missouri) =

- U.S. National Register of Historic Places
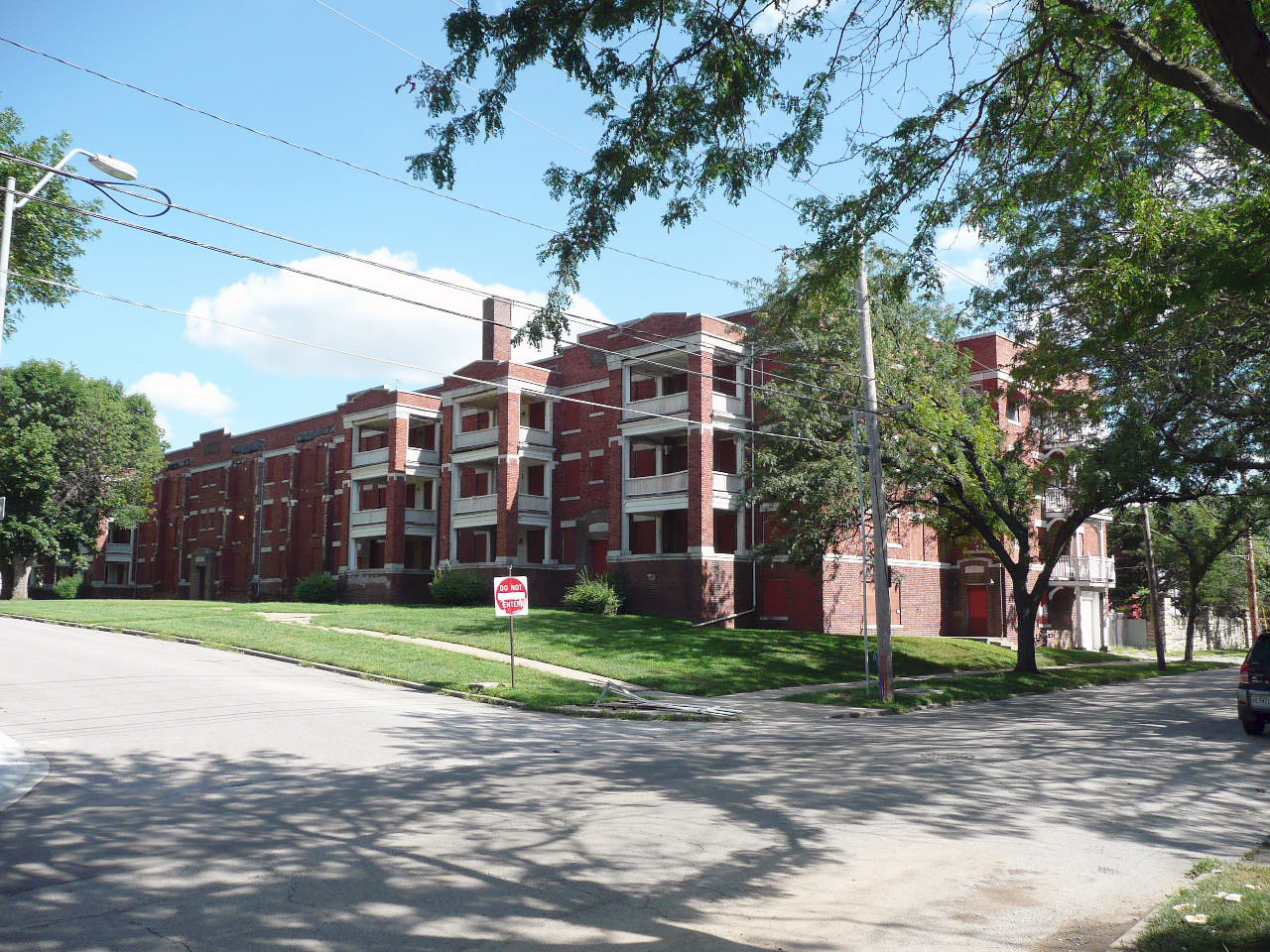

- Location within Missouri Location within the United States
- Location: 501-535 Knickerbocker Place, Kansas City, Missouri
- Coordinates: 39°3′53″N 94°35′31″W
- Built: 1909
- Architect: Middaugh, Leon Grant; Rose, J.A.
- Architectural style: Late 19th And 20th Century Revivals
- Demolished: 2020
- NRHP reference No.: 03000525
- Added to NRHP: June 13, 2003

The Knickerbocker Apartments were located at 501-535 Knickerbocker Place in the Valentine Neighborhood of Kansas City, Missouri. The Late 19th and 20th Century Revival style building was designed by Leon Grant Middaugh and J.A. Rose, and was built in 1909. It is significant for its architecture, and was added to the National Register of Historic Places in 2003. It was demolished in 2020.

The Historic Kansas City Foundation listed the apartments on their 2014 Most Endangered list of buildings in the Kansas City area. A fire in May 2020 created further damage to the vacant buildings. They were owned by the Kansas City Life Insurance Company and were demolished in July-August 2020. An identical building on the north side of the street was razed in 1982 for a Kansas City Life Insurance Company expansion project.

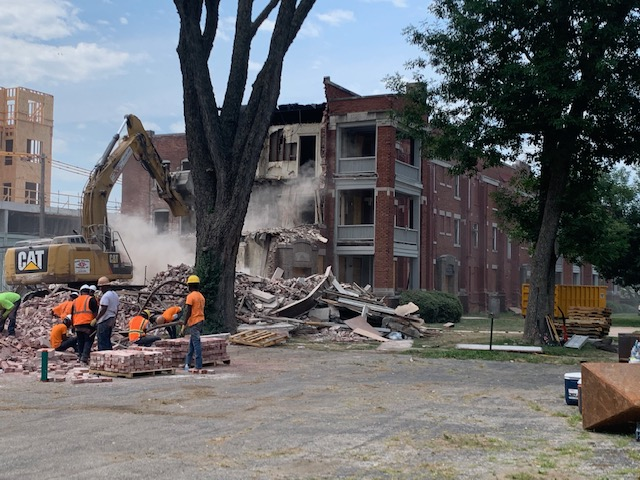
Demolition of the historic Knickerbocker Apartments, July 2020
