= North American Savings Bank =

American retail banking corporation

- Type: Public
- Industry: Banking, Mortgage Lending
- Founded: 1927
- Headquarters: Kansas City, Missouri
- Number of locations: 10
- Key people: Enrique Venegas (President & CEO)
- Products: Retail banking, Mortgage lending
- Parent: NASB Financial, Inc.
- Website: nasb.com

North American Savings Bank (NASB) is a federally chartered savings bank headquartered in Kansas City, Missouri. Established in 1927, it offers retail banking services in the Kansas City metropolitan area and nationwide mortgage lending.

== History ==
The institution was founded in 1927 as North American Savings Association and later became North American Savings Bank. In 1992, it converted to a federally chartered stock savings bank.

NASB Financial, Inc., its holding company, trades on the OTCQX under the symbol NASB. The company delisted from Nasdaq in 2014 but continues to publish financial disclosures.

== Operations ==
NASB operates ten branches in the Kansas City and St. Joseph, Missouri, metro areas, and offers checking, savings, and certificate of deposit products.The bank has a "5 Stars" rating from Bauer Financial.

The bank is also active in mortgage lending, including conventional and non-qualified mortgage (non-QM) products, such as 1099 loans, bank statement loans, and DSCR loans, and has been recognized in national rankings for its work with self-employed borrowers. The bank also has an Investment Real Estate lending division, offering commercial real estate loans, including build-to-suit, redevelopment, and ground-up construction loans, as well as residential construction loans such as homebuilder development, acquisition and development (A&D), and build-to-rent (BTR) loans.

On April 7, 2026, North American Savings Bank launched Profile Mortgage Solutions by NASB, a branded "doing business as" (DBA) name used to represent the bank’s non‑qualified mortgage (non‑QM) lending products. The brand functions as a collective identity for NASB’s non‑QM offerings and is primarily used for targeted marketing, while all loans continue to be originated and serviced directly by North American Savings Bank.

== See also ==
- List of banks in the United States
