= List of companies based in Bradford =

Bradford is home to the UK headquarters of:

- Aagrah - Asian restaurant chain
- BASF - UK subsidiary of the Germany Company formerly CIBA
- British Wool Marketing Board - central marketing system for UK fleece wool
- Damart – UK subsidiary of this French company
- Farmers Boy - meat subsidiary of Morrisons PLC
- Grattan plc - mail order catalogue company
- Hallmark Cards - UK subsidiary of this American company
- JCT600 - Car dealership company
- Morrisons - supermarket retailer
- Mumtaz - Asian restaurant chain and food making company
- Pace Micro Technology - set top box developer
- Safestyle UK - UK's largest independent provider of PVCu double glazed windows, doors, French doors, patio and sliding doors
- Seabrook Potato Crisps - potato crisp manufacturers
- Telegraph & Argus - daily newspaper
- Vanquis Banking Group - financial services group
- Yorkshire Building Society - the UK's fourth largest building society
- Yorkshire Water - collection, purification and distribution of water

Companies that are major employers but not based in Bradford include:

- Jet2.com - budget airline, based at Leeds Bradford Airport 9 miles (14 km) away in Yeadon
- Marks & Spencer - huge warehouse at the end of the M606 motorway
- Next plc - also have a warehouse in the city
