= CyberTel Cellular =

American cellular telecommunications company

- Type: Voice
- Location: United States
- Owner: Ameritech
- Established: 16 July 1984; 42 years ago
- Commercial?: Yes

CyberTel Cellular was an early St. Louis-based cellular telecommunications company. CyberTel's first cellular tower in St. Louis became operational on July 16, 1984.

The cellular phone that was in use at that time was the Motorola DynaTAC 8000X, costing $3,995. In October 1988, CyberTel, which offered paging services under the name BeepCall, acquired Minnesota Communications Corporation to effectively double its paging services, according to David Bayer, president, and owner of CyberTel.

== Acquisition ==
CyberTel was acquired by Ameritech in 1991 for $512 million, which operated the company under the name CyberTel Cellular and Paging until the fall of 1994, when the name was finally changed to Ameritech Cellular.
