= Home State Life Insurance Company =

- Industry: Insurance
- Founded: 1929
- Founder: Joe D. Morris
- Defunct: 1958
- Fate: Acquired
- Successor: American General Life Insurance Company
- Headquarters: Oklahoma, United States

Home State Life Insurance Company was an American insurance company based in Oklahoma that operated from 1929 to 1958, when it became part of American General Life Insurance Company. Prior to its acquisition it grew to become one of the largest firms serving Oklahoma City.

Home State Life Insurance Company offered a range of insurance products, including life, accident, and health insurance. The company also provided investment services, such as annuities and retirement plans.

== History ==
The company was founded by Joe D. Morris as an insurance and investment enterprise.

In 1945, Morris acquired the former India Temple Shrine Building, which he remodeled to serve as the company's offices. The building, now known as the Journal Record Building, is located in downtown Oklahoma City and is listed on the National Register of Historic Places.

In 1958, Home State Life Insurance Company was acquired by American General Life Insurance Company, a Houston-based insurance company. Following the acquisition, the Home State Life Insurance Company ceased to exist as a separate entity and became part of American General Life Insurance Company.
