= Tinker Federal Credit Union =

- Company type: Credit union
- Industry: Financial services
- Founded: 1946
- Headquarters: Tinker AFB, Oklahoma, United States
- Key people: Dave Willis, President / CEO
- Products: Savings; checking; consumer loans; mortgages; credit cards
- Total assets: $6.1B USD (2025)
- Members: 470,000
- Number of employees: 900+
- Website: tinkerfcu.org

Tinker Federal Credit Union (TFCU) is a credit union headquartered in Tinker AFB, Oklahoma. Chartered and regulated under the authority of the National Credit Union Administration (NCUA) of the U.S. federal government. TFCU is the largest credit union in Oklahoma and serves Air Force personnel from Tinker Air Force Base, as well as the employees of more than 2,200 area companies, and residents of Oklahoma and Texas. As of June 2025, TFCU has $6.1 billion in assets, over 480,000 members and 30+ full-service branches.

== History ==
Tinker Federal Credit Union was founded on March 20, 1946, by a small group of civilian employees working at Tinker Field in Tinker Air Force Base. Since then, it has grown to become the largest credit union in Oklahoma.

== Charitable activities ==
Tinker Federal is a large contributor to the Combined Federal Campaign, having donated over $1 million to the program. TFCU also hosts an annual fundraiser as a benefit for the Children's Miracle Network and the Children's Medical Research Institute of Oklahoma City.
