= Boxman Studios =

American manufacturing company

Boxman Studios, LLC
- Company type: Private
- Founded: 2009
- Founder: David Campbell
- Headquarters: 12140 Vance Davis Drive, Charlotte, NC, United States 28269
- Website: boxmanstudios.com

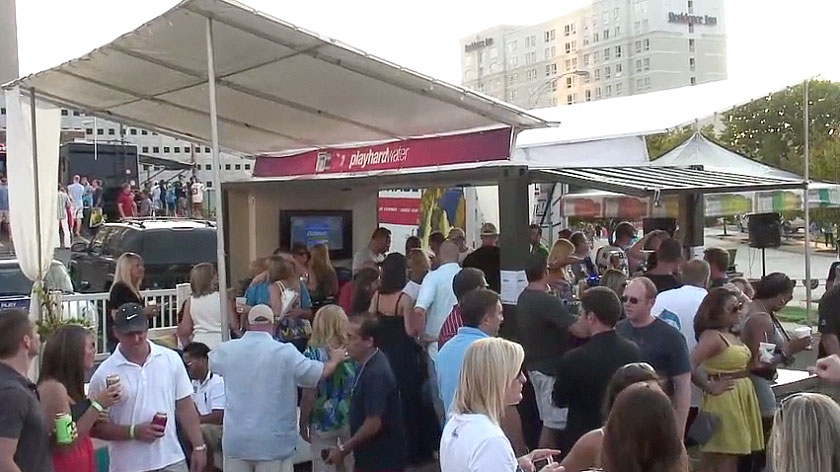
A boxman studios popup-party in Charlotte

Boxman Studios is an American manufacturing company based in Charlotte, North Carolina.

== History ==
In 2008, the company began fabricating metal shipping containers for the hospitality industry. Their concept was to create environmentally friendly mobile hospitality venues by repurposing decommissioned containers and turning them into upscale outdoor spaces for events and trade shows that they deliver and deploy.

The "pop up parties" have been used by Budweiser events at NASCAR races, and by vitaminwater at NFL tailgate parties. The units can be combined into several stories, or expanded with panels between them to allow for dance floors. The solar power provides electricity for the refrigerators, bars, music decks, even television sets. Setting up a unit of 46 m2 which is complete with a variety of purposes takes twenty minutes.

In 2010 Boxman Studios was nominated as one of the 25 finalists for the Opportunity Green Innovative Green Startup Award.

Because the Boxman Studios lunchbox is not on wheels, it was against the law to operate as a mobile food vendor unit in Charlotte. Boxman Studios was given a public hearing by Charlotte City Council to change the ordinance regulating mobile food vendors in 2010. They petitioned for the adoption of a text amendment to the zoning ordinance to expand the types of structures acceptable for use as mobile food vending services.
