= List of companies in Campinas =

The following is a partial list of private and public companies based in the mesoregion of Campinas, in the state of São Paulo, Brazil, as of August 2006. This region held nine percent of Brazilian Gross Industrial Product.

In the following table, Sales are expressed in million US dollars in 2005. Rank has been determined by a composite index developed by Exame magazine's Maiores e Melhores 2005 (Largest and Best Companies of Brazil).

Rank	No	Name	City	Sales	Employees
44	1	Grupo CPFL	Campinas	4,272	3,746
56	2	Bosch	Campinas	1,994	11,838
80	3	Elektro	Campinas	1,444	2,558
93	4	Honda Automóveis	Sumaré	1,277	1,818
104	5	Rhodia	Paulínia	11,64	2,793
144	6	Eaton	Valinhos	913	5,302
164	7	Motorola	Jaguariuna	782	
197	8	Sotreq	Valinhos	670	2,302
200	9	DPaschoal	Campinas	654	3,898
207	10	3M	Sumaré	648	2,910
271	11	Valeo	Itatiba	496	3,221
288	12	Villares Metals	Sumaré	472	1,512
293	13	International Paper	Mogi Guaçu	469	1,377
358	14	Fratelli Vita (Ambev)	Jaguariuna	370	1,028
383	15	Rigesa	Campinas	345	1,832
409	16	EMS	Hortolândia	319	1,200
482	17	Romi	Santa Bárbara	264	2,330
526	18	Tenneco	Mogi Mirim	234	1,601
527	19	Unimed Campinas	Campinas	234	2,500
544	20	Mabe Mexico (General Electric)	Campinas	225	1,524
579	21	Cristália	Itapira	199	1,529
586	22	Medley Farma	Campinas	196	1,191
596	23	Magneti Marelli	Hortolândia	191	663
678	24	Galvani	Paulinia	154	1,638
707	25	Pisa	Jaguariuna	145	328
747	26	Selmi	Sumaré	134	744
772	27	SEMESA	Campinas	127	
788	28	SANASA	Campinas	126	1,563
807	29	Guabi	Campinas	122	967
864	30	Filtros Mann	Indaiatuba	110	900
904	31	Nutron	Campinas	103	538
947	32	Borealis	Itatiba	98	
989	33	Vivax	Americana	91	873
		Daitan	Campinas		700
Total				19,042	66,710

== See also ==
- Brazilian Silicon Valley
- Economy of Brazil
- List of companies of Brazil
