= CMI Roadbuilding =

CMI Roadbuilding, Inc. of Oklahoma City began in 1961, when engineers headed by Bill Swisher started looking for new methods in the road building industry. Little had changed since the early 1900s in the methods of building roads, however, labor costs were skyrocketing and inflation meant taxpayers dollars were buying less and less. In the same period Society was becoming increasingly more mobile creating demand for better roads and highways. The CMI group believed that many road failures were due to poor riding surface which was mainly caused by inaccuracies in the subgrade.

== Autograde ==
A machine was developed that could economically implement an Automated Profile Road Building Method and would be known as the Autograde. This machine was known as either a “trimmer-spreader” or a fine-grader. It could trim or cut off high spots of a road bed and then spread the soil across the entire width of the road profile. By its very nature it was fine-grading the base course of the new road. The Autograde used an auger with cutting teeth to perform this function.

== Features ==
The Autograde could be adapted to perform many tasks including:

Single or dual lane Trimmer-spreader

Using the auger with cutting teeth, it could fine grade the road bed.

Base Reclaimer

Using the auger and a conveyor belt to pick up excess material and deposit it in a truck.

Asphalt Paver

Using the auger and screed to place and level asphalt on the road.

Concrete Slip for paving

Using the auger and screed to place and form a concrete slab.

== Advantages ==
This one machine could do the same work as numerous other pieces of machinery, only more quickly and more accurately.

== Acquisitions ==
CMI acquired two concrete batch plant manufacturers, Ross Co. in Texas and C.S. Johnson in Illinois.

== Further developments ==
CMI Went on to develop other equipment and was purchased by Terex in 2001. The remaining CMI Roadbuilding products were sold in 2013 to and independent company along with the CMI Roadbuilding Inc. name. CMI Roadbuilding established a separate facility in Oklahoma City, OK. Subsequently CMI also purchased the shuttered Terex Cranes Facility in Waverly, IA. Production of product lines was relocated to facility in 2017.
