= Luca Selmi =

Luca Selmi from the University of Udine, Italy was named Fellow of the Institute of Electrical and Electronics Engineers (IEEE) in 2015 for research on carrier transport and reliability of semiconductor devices.
