= GPS Air =

American indoor air quality company

- Type: Private
- Industry: Indoor air quality
- Founded: 2008
- Headquarters: Charlotte, North Carolina, U.S.

GPS Air, formerly Global Plasma Solutions, is an American indoor air quality company that provides air quality technologies for residential, commercial and industrial buildings with a focus on using "needlepoint bipolar ionization", also known as soft ionization. The company produces in-duct and in-room air quality products designed for nearly all indoor spaces. After the outbreak of the COVID-19 pandemic thousands of locations purchased their products for treating the indoor air.

Investigations by Boeing, air quality organizations such as the American Society of Heating, Refrigerating and Air-Conditioning Engineers (ASHRAE), and various academic researchers into the efficacy of the air purifiers GPS Air sold raised concerns about both their effectiveness and the potential negative health effects that could occur from the high levels of negative ions produced by the devices. In response, the company filed lawsuits against a member of ASHRAE and the academic publisher Elsevier.

== History ==
Founded in 2008 in Savannah, Georgia, GPS Air was created as an air purification sales company focused on "needlepoint bi-polar cold plasma" as the primary function of its products. In October 2018, the company was purchased by the investment firm Falfurrias Capital Partners and had its headquarters moved to Charlotte, North Carolina.

In July 2022, the company formally updated its brand name from Global Plasma Solutions to GPS Air to reflect its core focus on building indoor air quality technology.

=== Lawsuits ===
A class action lawsuit was filed in Delaware by Robert Garner in May 2021 against GPS Air regarding their products using "needlepoint bipolar ionization" to inactivate microorganisms in the air. The suit claimed that the technology used by the devices was false advertising and did not function as stated, citing an investigation done by Kaiser Health News on the same devices that were sold to over 2,000 schools in the United States. Some counties, such as Shelby County, Tennessee, and cities, such as Charlotte, North Carolina, used millions of dollars from covid relief funds to install the devices in schools and other locations. The original testing done by GPS Air on the devices was scaled down due to the lack of a lab with the right equipment, resulting in a testing scenario involving an area the "size of a shoebox". This region was "blasted with 27,000 ions per cubic centimeter" and was stated by the company to be successful at reducing 99% of pathogens in the space, though it was later acknowledged by the company founder that the amount of ions the machines are able to routinely put out is 13 times lower when dealing with a normal sized room.

While a study originally conducted by the aerospace corporation Boeing in September 2020 on the devices did indicate its effectiveness, a subsequent study done by Boeing for a longer period of time found the devices to have "no observable reduction in viability" of E. coli in the testing area. GPS Air responded by stating that the study had been conducted on pathogens on surfaces and not in the air, with the latter being what the ionization devices were made to counteract. An additional study done at the University of Arizona found that the devices did indeed kill microorganisms when they were producing ions at "62,000 negative ions per cubic centimeter", but that this was an order of magnitude higher than the ion production rates of the devices under normal usage. Furthermore, other studies have found that ionization levels over 60,000 produced negative health impacts on humans. After information about the lawsuit became public, the Newark, California, school district began removing the devices from area schools alongside concerns about the air quality being made worse by the technology.

The Garner case was ultimately dismissed by Delaware Third Circuit Judge Stephanos Bibas in 2022 because of lack of standing for class action certification due to the manner in which Garner had purchased his GPS purifiers through a third party seller. A separate class action lawsuit was subsequently filed in Delaware by the same law firm that had represented Garner and focused around two claims, that the purifiers weren't effective against COVID-19 as marketing advertisements claimed and that independent testing of effectiveness hadn't been conducted as claimed, along with minor claims of fraudulent marketing and violation of consumer statutes. The lesser claims were dismissed by Judge Bibas in March 2024 as lacking enough direct evidence for marketing violations.

In September 2025, Judge Bibas ruled that the COVID-19 effectiveness claim would not receive class action certification due to not enough presented evidence to conclusively prove the devices were or were not effective. But certification was given for the claim of lack of independent testing, with those allowed into the class action being individuals who purchased a GPS purifier in Delaware between March 9, 2020, and June 15, 2021. Subsequently, Judge Bibas decertified and dismissed the case in July 2026 after the plaintiffs could not connect the device serial numbers to specific purchasers, meaning no individuals in Delaware could prove to have standing to be included in the class action lawsuit.

=== Response to scientific criticism ===
An open letter was filed by a dozen scientists and engineers against the ionization technology and warning schools against installing such devices. This warning was amplified by the Asthma & Allergy Foundation of America and the Environmental Protection Agency due to the potential negative health impacts. The Centers for Disease Control were also prompted to advise the United States Department of Education to send out notices advising schools to require higher levels of scientific evidence of efficacy of such devices before purchasing them, with the Department of Education updating regulations and guidelines in June 2021.

One of the signatories of the open letter was Marwa Zaatari, a member of ASHRAE, who compiled a list of public information on school district spending in relation to the ionization products. In response to this and her statements in the media that independent research hasn't corroborated the claims of GPS Air, the company filed a lawsuit against Zaatari in April 2021 for $180 million. That lawsuit was settled in 2023, resulting in the retraction of the open letter. Additionally, GPS Air filed a lawsuit earlier in March 2021 against Francis J. Offermann, President of the consulting firm Indoor Environmental Engineering, for the publication of an article in the firm's newsletter critical of the company. A third lawsuit was filed against the academic publishing organization Elsevier for their publication of studies, including one by Colorado State University professor Delphine Farmer, on GPS Air's devices showing their lack of efficacy. According to Retraction Watch, a federal judge allowed the case to proceed to trial after finding the air quality company plausibly alleged actual malice by the publisher.

== Products ==
Among others, one of the room mounted air purifiers made by GPS Air includes the GPS-FC24-AC that can be wall mounted in multiple small cassettes or to existing HVAC equipment. An additional device sold by the company is a "plasma generator" aimed at reducing the amount of microorganisms, including mold and allergens, in the air to prevent pets from becoming sick.

== Awards ==
The Indoor Air Quality (IAQ) Gold award was given by The ACHR News magazine in their 2016 Dealer Design Awards to the company's GPS-iClean device for room air purification.
