= List of companies in the City of Sunderland =

The following major companies either have headquarters or other significant interests in the City of Sunderland, North East England.

- Arriva
- Barclays Bank
- Berghaus
- Bernard Matthews Ltd
- Calsonic Kansei
- CitiGroup (CitiFinancial)
- EDF Energy
- Faurecia
- Hays Travel
- Johnson Controls
- Lear
- LG Electronics – the Washington DY plant closed in 2003
- Liebherr
- Littlewoods
- Lloyds TSB
- Moralbox
- Nike
- Nissan – the NMUK car plant produces the Qashqai, Juke and the Leaf
- Northern Rock
- Regus
- Royal & Sun Alliance (More Than)
- ScS
- Stagecoach North East – headquarters located on Dundas Street
- T-Mobile
- TRW
- Valeo

== See also ==
- Economy of England
- Lists of companies
