= Oscium =

American hardware company

- Company type: Private
- Industry: Electronics
- Founded: 2010
- Founders: Matt Lee and Bryan Lee
- Headquarters: Oklahoma City
- Products: iMSO-104 iMSO-204 iMSO-204x; Logiscope; WiPry 5x
- Website: www.oscium.com

Oscium is an American hardware company that produces portable tools for field techs.

== History ==
The company was founded in 2010 by Matt Lee and Bryan Lee, and headquartered in Oklahoma City. Oscium also has offices in Colorado Springs.

== Oscilloscopes ==
Oscium is a producer of oscilloscopes that are used in conjunction with a smartphone or tablet. The company's first oscilloscope was the iMSO-104, a mixed signal oscilloscope that was released in 2011. The iMSO-104 supports one channel of analog and four digital channels, and its functions include triggering, running measurements, the ability to freeze the display, screen shot, data capture, and configuration saving. In 2013 the iMSO-204 was released, which added a second analog channel, increased its processing rate from 12MSPS to 50MSPS, and its memory from 240 to 1000 points. In 2017, they released the iMSO-204x, which added a universal platform support.

== WiPry and Logiscope ==
Oscium also produces the Logiscope, which has sixteen channels of logic analysis, and the WiPry 5x, which supports dual band spectrum analysis (2.4 & 5 GHz). The WiPry 5x can be used with iOS, Android, PC and Mac.
