= Carolina Weekly Newspaper Group =

Carolina Weekly Newspaper Group is a Charlotte, North Carolina company founded in 2002 that owns four North Carolina-based regional newspapers. The Carolina Weekly Newspaper Group delivers to 60,000 homes and businesses. In 2015 it was acquired by the McElvy Media Group.

== History ==
Alain Lillie founded the Carolina Weekly Newspaper Group in Charlotte, NC in 2002 at which time he created the South Charlotte Weekly, the Union County Weekly, and the Matthews-Mint Hill Weekly newspapers. Formerly known as the Charlotte Weekly, it grew to include four community newspapers, adding the Pineville Pilot. Together, these newspapers were delivered weekly or monthly to 60,000 residential and commercial addresses.

=== Acquisition ===
In July 2015, the Carolina Weekly Newspaper Group announced that it had been acquired by the Charlotte Media Group, a subsidiary of the McElvy Media Group based out of Houston, Texas. Johnathan McElvy, owner of the McElvy Media Group, is the new publisher for the newspaper group, and the new editor is Hannah Chronis, who will manage all four newspapers.

=== Controversy ===
In 2011, the Carolina Weekly Newspaper Group raised concerns with two local United States Postal Service (USPS) branches regarding unfair mass mailing procedures offered to a competing newspaper group. A meeting at the Huntersville Post Office to discuss the concerns lead to Lillie being temporarily banned from the post office for trespassing. Lillie stated it was a misunderstanding and the ban was ultimately lifted.
