= Vivacious =

See also

- HMS Vivacious (D36), a British destroyer of the Royal Navy in commission from 1917 to the mid-1930s and from 1939 to 1945
- Vivacious (drag queen), Jamaican-American drag queen
