= Wheresville Records =

Independent record label founded in 1997 by Mark Miller

Wheresville Records is an independent record label formed in 1997 in Charlotte, North Carolina by musician/producer Mark Miller after releasing his first album, "Seasons of Ice" on Indie record label ICR Records in 1993. Miller formed Wheresville Records in order to rerelease Seasons of Ice as a remastered CD. His subsequent releases as well as various other recording artists including North Carolina bands, "The Hollar", "Crystal Shortcut" and "Dawn of Day" have released albums on the Wheresville label. Wheresville derives its name from Wheresville Sound Studio. Wheresville Sound is a project studio that Miller began putting together in 1982 in Asheville, North Carolina. The studio is currently located in the countryside between Spartanburg, South Carolina and Columbus, North Carolina. Wheresville Sound Studio caters mostly to local and regional artists, however indie artists from Japan and England have also recorded records at Wheresville with Miller producing and engineering. Miller has worked in the studio with Michael Wagener, Norbert Putnam, Gary Pihl of the band Boston and has worked on the live sound crew with The Steve Morse Band, Velvet Revolver, Alice in Chains and Sparta. A recurring radio show for Charlotte Indie Radio is produced at Wheresville Sound Studio featuring original music from North and South Carolina musicians. Audio production classes are offered periodically at the studio as well as production workshops at area schools and music stores, etc.
