= MidFirst Bank =

Regional Bank Located In Oklahoma

- Type: Private
- Founded: 1982; 44 years ago
- Headquarters: Oklahoma City, Oklahoma, United States
- Area served: Arizona (Phoenix), California (Los Angeles, Newport Beach, Santa Barbara, San Diego, San Francisco, South Bay), Colorado (Boulder, Denver, Fort Collins, Vail Valley), Nevada (Las Vegas), Oklahoma (Oklahoma City, Tulsa, Western Oklahoma), Texas (Dallas, Houston, San Antonio) and Utah (Salt Lake City).
- Key people: G. Jeffrey Records Jr. (Chairman); Todd Dobson (CEO)
- Products: Financial Services
- Services: Retail Banking, Commercial Banking, Private Banking, Wealth Management
- Net income: ▲ U.S. $507 million (YTD Q3 2026)
- Total assets: ▲ U.S. $43.8 billion (Q3 2026)
- Divisions: Midland Mortgage, MidFirst Business Credit, Vio Bank
- Website: www.midfirst.com

MidFirst Bank is an American bank based in Oklahoma City, Oklahoma. As of 2026, it was the largest privately owned bank in the United States, with $43.8 billion in assets.

The bank provides retail, commercial, private banking, wealth management and mortgage-banking services through locations in locations in Arizona, California, Colorado, Nevada, Oklahoma, Texas and Utah, as well as commercial lending offices in other U.S. markets. Its divisions also include Midland Mortgage, MidFirst Business Credit and Vio Bank.

== History ==
The Midland Group began in 1954 when W.R. Johnston, an Oklahoma banker, purchased a 50% share in Midland Mortgage Company, an Oklahoma City–based company that had been formed four years earlier. Today, family owns 100% of the Midland Group. In 1982, Midland Financial Co. purchased a recently formed charter bank in Stilwell, Oklahoma, and named it MidFirst Bank and moved it to Oklahoma City.

In 2009, MidFirst Bank acquired Community Bank of Arizona and Union Bank, both headquartered in the Phoenix metro area. In 2015, MidFirst Bank acquired Denver-based Steele Street Bank & Trust, a locally owned and operated community bank. In July 2016, MidFirst Bank acquired 1st Century Bancshares in Southern California. After the merger, MidFirst Bank's combined assets totaled more than $12 billion. In 2024, MidFirst acquired the six Houston, Texas banking locations of Florida-based Amerant Bank. Following the completion of the acquisition, MidFirst Bank had approximately $39 billion in total assets.

The bank offers a full range of commercial, trust, private banking, and mortgage banking products, and it serves as a commercial real estate lender and major servicer of mortgage loans nationally. Primary markets include Oklahoma, Texas, Arizona, Colorado, California, Nevada and Utah. MidFirst Bank also operates commercial lending offices in Atlanta, California, Chicago, New York City, Orlando, and Raleigh.

== Community involvement ==
MidFirst Bank financial education programs have received Honorable Mention recognition from the American Bankers Association Community Commitment Awards in 2016, 2018, and 2020 in the Financial Education category, and in 2020 in the Protecting Older Americans category. Additionally, MidFirst Bank has collaborated with the University of Oklahoma in providing the MoneyCoach financial education program. MidFirst Bank also partners with the True Corps program to serve the community.

MidFirst Bank Chairman G. Jeffrey Records Jr. is a part-owner of the Oklahoma City Thunder of the NBA through its ownership group, Professional Basketball Club.
