= Kansas City Life Insurance Company =

Public insurance company

- Type: Public
- Traded as: OTCQX: KCLI; Nasdaq: KCLI
- Industry: Insurance & Finance
- Founded: 1895; 131 years ago
- Headquarters: Kansas City, Missouri, U.S.
- Key people: Web Bixby (president & CEO)
- Number of employees: 500
- Website: www.kclife.com

Kansas City Life Insurance Company is a public insurance company established in 1895 and located in Kansas City, Missouri. The company's 1,400 agents market individual life, annuity, and group products through agencies located in 48 US states and the District of Columbia. Variable life, variable annuities, mutual funds, and other investment options are offered through a subsidiary, Sunset Financial Services.

== History ==
Beginning as Bankers Life Association in 1895, the company was founded by Major William Warner, President; J.H. North, Vice President; and S.E. Rumble, Secretary. Its headquarters were originally located in the Scheidley Building at Ninth and Main Street and later moved to the Navajo Building as the company expanded to Colorado and Minnesota. In 1900, the company changed its name from Bankers Life Association to Kansas City Life Insurance Company.

== Litigation ==
In June 2019, after obtaining a judgment of $34 million for suing State Farm for overcharges in 2018, Stueve Siegel Hanson LLP and Miller Schirger, LLC filed lawsuit against Kansas City Life Insurance Co, alleging the company “systematically overcharged” clients.

In June 2019, two firms filed a class-action lawsuit against Kansas City Life Insurance alleging the company “systematically overcharged” customers without permission. “The policies may become unaffordable, leaving policy owners without life insurance when it is needed most,” the firms said in a joint news release.

In November 2019, a Kansas City Life Co. client filed a class-action lawsuit accusing the life insurance provider of charging fees in excess of the limits outlined in its contract on 01 of October 2018. Plaintiff J. Gregory Sheldon bought a Flexible Premium Variable Life Insurance Contract Nonparticipating policy from Kansas City Life in December 2000. In addition to a death benefit, the policy provides an interest-bearing component that accumulates value over time.

In May 2020, the Missouri Federal Court found that Kansas City Life Insurance Company (“KC Life”) wrongfully rejected a certified nurse anaesthetist's claims for both short-term disability (STD) and long-term disability (LTD) benefits. KC Life rejected the claim because the insured was fired from his job because he was, "so addicted to Fentanyl that he injects himself at work."

On Thursday September 21, 2023, a Jackson County, Missouri jury returned a verdict in favor of a class of 535 Kansas City Life Insurance Company policyholdersafter less than three hours of deliberations.

Following a one-week trial, the jury awarded all damages sought for three separate breaches of the policy totaling $9.5 million. The judgment will be for $4.1 million to account for duplicative damages.

The class action, Sheldon v. Kansas City Life Insurance Company, was brought on behalf of current and former policy owners of Century II Variable Universal Life issued in the state of Missouri. It alleged that the insurer overcharged policyholders for their life insurance in three ways.

The substantial verdict follows verdicts in favor of policyholders in May 2023 and in December 2022.

“Three courts have found that Kansas City Life has breached its policies and three juries have awarded damages of over $35 million,” Patrick Stueve, lead trial counsel for the policyholders. “We are preparing for our fourth trial which will likely be in mid-2024.”
