= National Register of Historic Places listings in King County, Washington =

Location of King County in Washington

The following properties and districts in King County, Washington, United States, are on the National Register of Historic Places. Latitude and longitude coordinates are provided for many National Register properties and districts; these locations may be seen together in an online map.

There are 319 properties and districts listed on the National Register in the county. 226 of these listings are located in the city of Seattle, and are listed separately; the remaining 93 properties and districts are listed here. Another property in the county outside of Seattle was once listed on the National Register but has been removed.

This National Park Service list is complete through NPS recent listings posted October 30, 2026.

== Current listings ==
| | Name on the Register | Image | Date listed | Location | City or town | Description |
|---|---|---|---|---|---|---|
| 1 | William and Estella Adair Farm | William and Estella Adair Farm | March 22, 2002 (#02000249) | 27929 NE 100th St. 47°41′01″N 121°57′56″W | Carnation | |
| 2 | Horatio and Laura Allen Farm | Horatio and Laura Allen Farm | March 22, 2002 (#02000250) | 28704 NE Cherry Valley Rd. 47°45′06″N 121°57′04″W | Duvall | |
| 3 | Arthur Foss | Arthur Foss | April 11, 1989 (#89001078) | Moss Bay waterfront 47°40′30″N 122°12′26″W | Kirkland | The Arthur Foss, although registered in Kirkland, is now based at Northwest Seaport in Seattle. |
| 4 | Auburn Post Office | Auburn Post Office | April 21, 2000 (#00000407) | 20 Auburn Ave. NE; 47°18′29″N 122°13′35″W | Auburn | |
| 5 | Auburn Public Library | Auburn Public Library | August 3, 1982 (#82004221) | 306 Auburn Ave. 47°18′34″N 122°13′38″W | Auburn | Carnegie Libraries of Washington TR |
| 6 | Baring Bridge | Baring Bridge | August 26, 2019 (#100004331) | NE Index Creek Road off US 2 over S. Fork of Skykomish River; 47°45′55″N 121°28′50″W | Baring | |
| 7 | Black Diamond Cemetery | Black Diamond Cemetery | April 21, 2000 (#00000406) | Cemetery Hill Rd. 47°18′39″N 122°00′55″W | Black Diamond | |
| 8 | Oscar Blomeen House | Oscar Blomeen House | June 21, 1991 (#91000781) | 324 B St. NE. 47°18′40″N 122°13′35″W | Auburn | |
| 9 | William E. Boeing House | William E. Boeing House | December 16, 1988 (#88002743) | Huckleberry Ln. 47°44′50″N 122°22′18″W | Highlands | Gated, guarded community; photo here |
| 10 | Bothell Pioneer Cemetery | Bothell Pioneer Cemetery | February 16, 1996 (#96000050) | Jct. of 108th Ave. NE. and NE. 180th St., NE and SE corners 47°45′32″N 122°11′39″W | Bothell | Bothell MPS |
| 11 | Brandes House | | December 14, 1994 (#94001436) | 2202 212th Ave. SE. 47°34′39″N 122°03′14″W | Sammamish | |
| 12 | Camp North Bend | Camp North Bend | April 29, 1993 (#93000372) | 45509 SE. 150th St. 47°28′10″N 121°43′58″W | North Bend vicinity | |
| 13 | Dr. Reuben Chase House | Dr. Reuben Chase House | August 27, 1990 (#90001246) | 17819 113th Ave. NE; 47°45′27″N 122°11′20″W | Bothell | Bothell MPS |
| 14 | James W. Clise House | James W. Clise House | June 19, 1973 (#73001874) | 6046 Lake Sammamish Pkwy., NE; 47°39′42″N 122°07′13″W | Redmond | |
| 15 | Colvos Store | Colvos Store | August 10, 2000 (#00000970) | 123rd Ave. SW and Cove Rd. 47°27′55″N 122°29′29″W | Vashon | |
| 16 | Covenant Beach Bible Camp | Covenant Beach Bible Camp | January 11, 2006 (#05000313) | Cliff Ave. and 220th St. 47°24′26″N 122°19′43″W | Des Moines | |
| 17 | Covington Electrical Substation, Bonneville Power Administration | Covington Electrical Substation, Bonneville Power Administration | May 29, 2018 (#100002475) | 28401 Covington Way SE; 47°20′58″N 122°07′10″W | Covington | |
| 18 | Dockton Hotel | | July 28, 1983 (#83003337) | 260th St., SE and 99th Ave., SW; 47°22′15″N 122°27′38″W | Dockton | Better known as "Dockton School". Presumed demolished. |
| 19 | John and Kate Dougherty Farmstead | John and Kate Dougherty Farmstead | December 1, 2005 (#05001353) | 26524 NE Cherry Valley Rd. 47°45′05″N 121°59′03″W | Duvall | |
| 20 | Dr. Trueblood House | Dr. Trueblood House | August 3, 1982 (#82004222) | 129 6th Ave. 47°40′46″N 122°12′25″W | Kirkland | |
| 21 | James G. Eddy House and Grounds | James G. Eddy House and Grounds | February 19, 1982 (#82004226) | 1005 Evergreen Point Rd. 47°37′11″N 122°14′23″W | Medina | |
| 22 | David and Martha Entwistles House | David and Martha Entwistles House | July 28, 1999 (#99000918) | 32021 E. Entwistle St. 47°38′52″N 121°54′31″W | Carnation | |
| 23 | Falls City Masonic Hall | Falls City Masonic Hall | August 25, 2004 (#04000922) | 4304 337th Place SE; 47°34′01″N 121°53′21″W | Fall City | |
| 24 | Faust-Ryan House | Faust-Ryan House | May 19, 1994 (#94000405) | 18604 104th Ave. 47°45′49″N 122°11′56″W | Bothell | Bothell MPS |
| 25 | Gaffney's Lake Wilderness Lodge | Gaffney's Lake Wilderness Lodge | March 28, 2003 (#03000163) | 22500 SE 248th St. 47°22′45″N 122°02′14″W | Maple Valley | |
| 26 | Great Northern Depot | Great Northern Depot | April 14, 1997 (#97000322) | Jct. of Railroad Ave. and 4th St., SE corner 47°42′34″N 121°21′34″W | Skykomish | |
| 27 | Andrew and Bergette Hjertoos Farm | Andrew and Bergette Hjertoos Farm | March 22, 2002 (#02000248) | 31523 NE 40th 47°38′34″N 121°54′59″W | Carnation | |
| 28 | Hollywood Farm | Hollywood Farm | December 15, 1978 (#78002757) | SE of Woodinville at 14111 NE 145th St. 47°43′48″N 122°08′59″W | Woodinville | |
| 29 | Independent Order of Odd Fellows (IOOF) Hall No. 148 | Independent Order of Odd Fellows (IOOF) Hall No. 148 | July 28, 1999 (#99000917) | 3940 Tolt Ave. 47°38′39″N 121°54′51″W | Carnation | |
| 30 | Issaquah Depot | Issaquah Depot | September 13, 1990 (#90001461) | Rainier Ave. N 47°31′53″N 122°02′02″W | Issaquah | |
| 31 | Issaquah Sportsmen's Club | Issaquah Sportsmen's Club | November 19, 1998 (#98001419) | 23600 SE Evans St. 47°31′36″N 122°01′31″W | Issaquah | |
| 32 | Jovita Land Company Model Home-Corbett House | Jovita Land Company Model Home-Corbett House | March 10, 2004 (#04000158) | 4600 S. 364th St. 47°16′33″N 122°16′32″W | Federal Way | |
| 33 | Keewaydin Clubhouse | Keewaydin Clubhouse | August 24, 2005 (#05000923) | 1836 72nd Ave. SE; 47°35′44″N 122°14′34″W | Mercer Island | |
| 34 | Lilly Kirk House | Lilly Kirk House | March 9, 1995 (#95000188) | 19619 100th Ave. NE; 47°46′15″N 122°12′28″W | Bothell | Bothell MPS |
| 35 | Peter Kirk Building | Peter Kirk Building | August 14, 1973 (#73001873) | 620 Market St. 47°40′49″N 122°12′34″W | Kirkland | |
| 36 | Kirkland Woman's Club | Kirkland Woman's Club | January 26, 1990 (#89002321) | 407 First St. 47°40′42″N 122°12′31″W | Kirkland | |
| 37 | Lakeview School | Lakeview School | June 16, 1988 (#88000742) | Island Crest Way and S.E. Sixty-eighth St. 47°32′31″N 122°13′14″W | Mercer Island | Rural Public Schools of Washington State MPS |
| 38 | Lester Depot | Lester Depot | September 10, 1987 (#87001534) | US Forest Service Rd. 212, Green River Watershed; 47°12′32″N 121°29′38″W | Lester | Has been demolished. |
| 39 | Loomis House | Loomis House | August 3, 1982 (#82004223) | 304 8th Ave., W. 47°40′58″N 122°12′41″W | Kirkland | |
| 40 | Maloney's General Store | Maloney's General Store | August 29, 1997 (#97001078) | 104 Railroad Ave. W 47°42′34″N 121°21′40″W | Skykomish | |
| 41 | Louis S. Marsh House | Louis S. Marsh House | June 30, 1989 (#89000500) | 6604 Lake Washington Blvd. 47°39′57″N 122°12′16″W | Kirkland | |
| 42 | Marymoor Prehistoric Indian Site | Marymoor Prehistoric Indian Site | November 20, 1970 (#70000642) | Address Restricted | Redmond | |
| 43 | Masonic Lodge Building | Masonic Lodge Building | August 3, 1982 (#82004224) | 700 Market St. 47°40′50″N 122°12′34″W | Kirkland | |
| 44 | Masonic Temple-Auburn | Masonic Temple-Auburn | July 21, 2015 (#15000454) | 10 Auburn Way S. 47°18′27″N 122°13′32″W | Auburn | |
| 45 | McGrath Cafe and Hotel (The McGrath) | McGrath Cafe and Hotel (The McGrath) | February 21, 2002 (#02000089) | 101 W. North Bend Way; 47°29′42″N 121°47′05″W | North Bend | |
| 46 | Messenger of Peace Chapel Car | Messenger of Peace Chapel Car | January 21, 2009 (#08000998) | 38625 SE King St. 47°31′42″N 121°49′38″W | Snoqualmie | |
| 47 | Mukai Cold Process Fruit Barrelling Plant | Mukai Cold Process Fruit Barrelling Plant | September 26, 1994 (#94001165) | 18005, 18017 107th Ave. SW; 47°26′36″N 122°28′16″W | Vashon | |
| 48 | Aaron Neely Sr., Mansion | Aaron Neely Sr., Mansion | October 15, 1974 (#74001955) | E of Auburn off WA 18; 47°18′03″N 122°10′36″W | Auburn | |
| 49 | Neighbor-Bennett House | Neighbor-Bennett House | August 25, 2004 (#04000921) | 4317-337th Place SE; 47°34′00″N 121°53′28″W | Fall City | |
| 50 | Nelson–Parker House | Nelson–Parker House | April 21, 2014 (#14000166) | 17605 182nd Ave, NE; 47°45′21″N 122°05′51″W | Woodinville | |
| 51 | Norman Bridge | Norman Bridge | July 19, 1994 (#94000676) | Old 428th Ave. SE, across the N. Fork, Snoqualmie R. 47°30′58″N 121°46′05″W | North Bend | Has been demolished. |
| 52 | North Bend Ranger Station | North Bend Ranger Station | March 6, 1991 (#91000157) | 42404 SE. North Bend Way; 47°29′23″N 121°46′20″W | North Bend | |
| 53 | Louis and Ellen Olson House | Louis and Ellen Olson House | August 30, 1984 (#84003492) | 1513 Griffin Ave. 47°12′20″N 121°59′30″W | Enumclaw | |
| 54 | Mary Olson Farm | Mary Olson Farm | October 5, 2001 (#01001080) | 28728 Green River Rd. S. 47°20′40″N 122°12′13″W | Kent | |
| 55 | Pacific Coast Company House No. 75 | Pacific Coast Company House No. 75 | December 21, 1979 (#79002534) | N of Renton at 7210 138th St., SE; 47°32′17″N 122°09′21″W | Renton | |
| 56 | Luigi and Aurora Pagani House | Luigi and Aurora Pagani House | August 9, 2002 (#02000861) | 32907 Merino St. 47°18′24″N 122°00′23″W | Black Diamond | |
| 57 | Patton Bridge | Patton Bridge | May 24, 1995 (#95000626) | Green Valley Rd. over the Green R. 47°17′18″N 122°09′34″W | Auburn | Bridges of Washington State MPS |
| 58 | Pickering Farm | Pickering Farm | July 7, 1983 (#83003343) | 21809 SE 56th St. 47°32′58″N 122°02′55″W | Issaquah | |
| 59 | Point Robinson Light Station | Point Robinson Light Station | April 21, 2004 (#04000359) | NE end of Maury Island in Puget Sound; 47°23′16″N 122°22′29″W | Vashon Island | |
| 60 | Preston Community Clubhouse | Preston Community Clubhouse | December 4, 2008 (#08001186) | 8625 310th Ave. SE; 47°31′24″N 121°55′45″W | Preston | |
| 61 | Redmond City Park | Redmond City Park | January 6, 2009 (#08001302) | 7802 168th Ave NE; 47°40′23″N 122°06′56″W | Redmond | |
| 62 | RELIEF (lightship) | RELIEF (lightship) | April 23, 1975 (#75001852) | Central Waterfront at Moss Bay; 47°40′30″N 122°12′26″W | Kirkland | |
| 63 | St. Edward Seminary | St. Edward Seminary | March 8, 2007 (#07000137) | 14445 Juanita Dr. NE; 47°43′58″N 122°14′45″W | Kenmore | |
| 64 | Erick Gustave Sanders Mansion | Erick Gustave Sanders Mansion | November 6, 1986 (#86003163) | 5516 S. Two Hundred and Seventy-seventh St. 47°21′17″N 122°15′50″W | Kent | |
| 65 | Joshua Sears Building | Joshua Sears Building | August 3, 1982 (#82004225) | 701 Market St. 47°40′51″N 122°12′35″W | Kirkland | |
| 66 | Seattle Municipal Light and Power Plant | Seattle Municipal Light and Power Plant | September 11, 1997 (#97001077) | 20030 Cedar Falls Rd. SE; 47°25′04″N 121°46′05″W | North Bend vicinity | Also known as Cedar Falls Historic District |
| 67 | Seattle Naval Hospital Chapel | Seattle Naval Hospital Chapel | December 26, 2023 (#100009645) | 1902 NE 150th Street; 47°44′15″N 122°18′27″W | Shoreline | |
| 68 | Selleck Historic District | Selleck Historic District | March 16, 1989 (#89000214) | SE 252nd 47°22′33″N 121°52′00″W | Selleck | |
| 69 | Shawnee House | Shawnee House | November 22, 2000 (#00001449) | 11608 SW Shawnee Rd. 47°22′56″N 122°28′57″W | Vashon | |
| 70 | Si View Park | Si View Park | January 7, 2015 (#14001143) | 400 SE. Orchard Dr. 47°29′27″N 121°46′58″W | North Bend | |
| 71 | Skykomish Historic Commercial District | Skykomish Historic Commercial District | August 10, 2000 (#00000974) | Railroad Ave., from 3rd St. to W of N 6th St., and part of Old Cascade Hwy. 47°42′35″N 121°21′34″W | Skykomish | |
| 72 | Snoqualmie Depot | Snoqualmie Depot | July 24, 1974 (#74001963) | 109 King St. 47°31′43″N 121°49′28″W | Snoqualmie | |
| 73 | Snoqualmie Falls | Snoqualmie Falls | September 2, 2009 (#92000784) | Snoqualmie R. below crossing of WA 522; 47°32′29″N 121°50′14″W | Snoqualmie | |
| 74 | Snoqualmie Falls Cavity Generating Station | Snoqualmie Falls Cavity Generating Station | April 23, 1976 (#76001895) | N of Snoqualmie on Snoqualmie River; 47°32′27″N 121°50′15″W | Snoqualmie | |
| 75 | Snoqualmie Falls Hydroelectric Power Plant Historic District | Snoqualmie Falls Hydroelectric Power Plant Historic District | October 24, 1992 (#92001324) | WA 202, .5 mi. N of Snoqualmie; 47°32′26″N 121°50′13″W | Snoqualmie | |
| 76 | Snoqualmie School Campus | Snoqualmie School Campus | March 16, 1989 (#89000209) | Silva and King Sts. 47°31′44″N 121°49′38″W | Snoqualmie | |
| 77 | Sorenson House | Sorenson House | March 9, 1995 (#95000187) | 10011 W. Riverside Dr. 47°45′23″N 122°12′19″W | Bothell | Bothell MPS |
| 78 | Helmer and Selma Steen House | Helmer and Selma Steen House | August 10, 2000 (#00000976) | 10924 SW Cove Rd. 47°27′22″N 122°28′24″W | Vashon | |
| 79 | Stevens Pass Historic District | Stevens Pass Historic District | October 22, 1976 (#76001884) | West of Berne on U.S. 2; 47°44′40″N 121°06′03″W | Berne | |
| 80 | William Harper Thorton House | William Harper Thorton House | November 7, 1997 (#97001408) | 17424 95th Ave, NE; 47°45′19″N 122°12′44″W | Bothell | Bothell MPS |
| 81 | TOURIST II (auto ferry) | TOURIST II (auto ferry) | April 15, 1997 (#97000321) | 25 Lake Shore Plaze, Marina Park; 47°40′29″N 122°12′27″W | Kirkland | |
| 82 | Tracy House | Tracy House | July 13, 1995 (#95000830) | 18971 Edgecliff Dr. SW. 47°25′57″N 122°20′58″W | Normandy Park | The NRHP lists this in Seattle, but it is actually in Normandy Park. |
| 83 | Trommald Building | Trommald Building | August 24, 2000 (#00000972) | 1523-1525 Cole St. 47°12′12″N 121°59′19″W | Enumclaw | |
| 84 | Tukwila School | Tukwila School | November 29, 1979 (#79002544) | 14475 59th Ave., S. 47°28′20″N 122°15′25″W | Tukwila | Now Tukwila Heritage and Cultural Center. |
| 85 | Untitled Earthwork-Johnson Pit #30 | Untitled Earthwork-Johnson Pit #30 | August 16, 2021 (#100006801) | 21610 37th Place South; 47°24′27″N 122°17′01″W | SeaTac | |
| 86 | Vashon Hardware Store | Vashon Hardware Store | August 10, 2000 (#00000971) | 17601 99th Ave. SW; 47°26′50″N 122°27′34″W | Vashon | |
| 87 | Vincent School | Vincent School | August 25, 2004 (#04000920) | 8010 W. Snoqualmie Valley Rd. 47°40′26″N 121°58′42″W | Carnation | Rural Public Schools of Washington State MPS |
| 88 | Dr. Johan and Louise Wenberg House | Dr. Johan and Louise Wenberg House | May 20, 2024 (#100010385) | 5360 232nd Avenue SE; 47°33′11″N 122°01′49″W | Issaquah | |
| 89 | Frederick W. Winters House | Frederick W. Winters House | April 21, 1992 (#92000367) | 2102 Bellevue Way, SE. 47°35′30″N 122°11′31″W | Bellevue | |
| 90 | Woodinville School | Woodinville School | August 28, 2017 (#100001517) | 13203 NE. 175th St; 47°45′15″N 122°09′46″W | Woodinville | |
| 91 | F. W. Woolworth Company Store | F. W. Woolworth Company Store | December 8, 2015 (#15000880) | 724 S. 3rd St. 47°28′48″N 122°12′25″W | Renton | |
| 92 | Harry Vanderbilt Wurdemann House | Harry Vanderbilt Wurdemann House | December 27, 1990 (#90002154) | 17602 Bothell Way NE; 47°45′19″N 122°16′29″W | Lake Forest Park | |
| 93 | The Yellowstone Road | The Yellowstone Road | December 2, 1974 (#74001956) | 196th St. between the Fall City Hwy. and 80th, NE; 47°39′59″N 122°06′03″W | Redmond | |

== Former listings ==
| | Name on the Register | Image | Date listed | Date removed | Location | City or town | Description |
|---|---|---|---|---|---|---|---|
| 1 | Enumclaw High School | Enumclaw High School | August 30, 1984 (#84003488) | January 20, 1988 | 2222 Porter St. | Enumclaw | Demolished |

== See also ==
- List of Landmarks in Seattle (city landmarks)
- National Register of Historic Places listings in Seattle, Washington
- List of landmarks in King County, Washington (county landmarks)
- List of National Historic Landmarks in Washington (state)
