= Anderson Park =

Anderson Park may refer to:

== Australia ==
- Anderson Park, Neutral Bay, New South Wales
- Anderson Park, Townsville, Queensland

== New Zealand ==
- Anderson Park, Invercargill

== United States ==
- Anderson Park (New Jersey) in Montclair, New Jersey
- Anderson River Park in Anderson, California
- Anderson Park (Redmond, Washington)
- Cal Anderson Park in Seattle, Washington

== See also ==
- Anderson .Paak (born 1986), an American rapper, singer, songwriter, record producer and multi-instrumentalist from California
