= Kirk House =

Kirk House can refer to:

In the United States ordered by state

- Bartlett-Kirk House, listed on the National Register of Historic Places (NRHP) in Batesville, Arizona
- Col. Edward N. Kirk House, listed on the NRHP in Sterling, Illinois
- Sennett and Bertha Kirk House, listed on the NRHP in Garnett, Kansas
- Elisha Kirk House, listed on the NRHP in Calvert, Maryland
- Kirk House (Narrowsburg, New York), listed on the NRHP in Sullivan County, New York
- John W. and Thomas F. Kirk House, listed on the NRHP in St. Paul, Oregon
- William Kirk House, listed on the NRHP in Turbotville, Pennsylvania
- Kirk's Cabin Complex, listed on the NRHP in Moab, Utah
- Lilly Kirk House, listed on the NRHP in Bothell, Washington
