= Auburn Public Library (Washington) =

Building in Washington, U.S.

- U.S. National Register of Historic Places
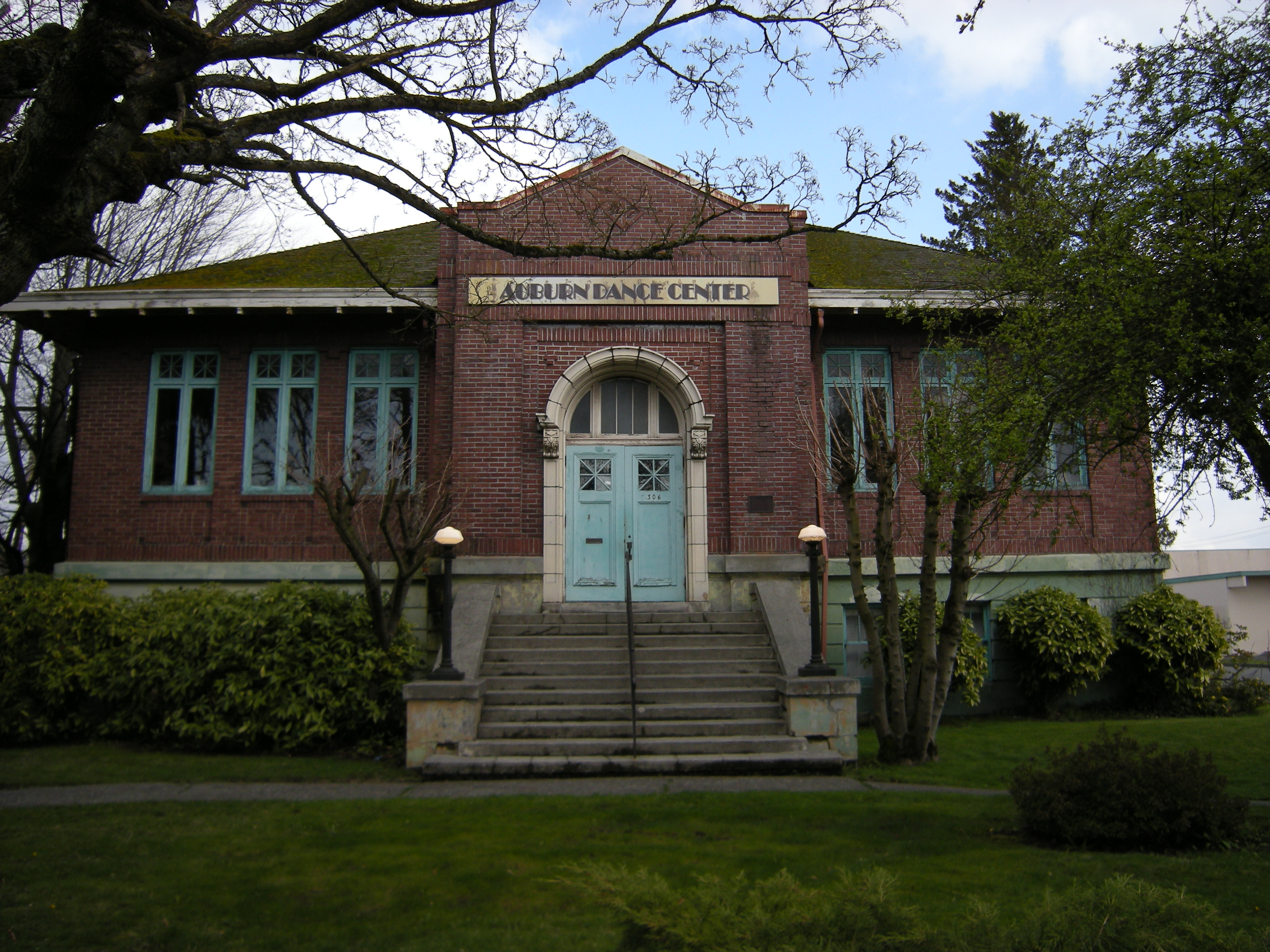

- Location within Washington (state)
- Location: 306 Auburn Ave., Auburn, Washington
- Coordinates: 47°18′34″N 122°13′38″W
- Area: less than one acre
- Built: 1914
- Architect: Myers, David J.
- MPS: Carnegie Libraries of Washington TR
- NRHP reference No.: 82004221
- Added to NRHP: August 3, 1982

The Auburn Public Library is a former library building located in Auburn, Washington listed on the National Register of Historic Places. The Auburn Carnegie library is a rectangular 2-story brick building with a cast concrete foundation. It has a hip roof with a slight flare at the projecting eaves. The roof is composition tile. The building measures 35 by 50 feet (11 by 15 m), and there is a 4 by 10 feet (1.2 by 3.0 m) extension at the center of the west facade. The extension projects above the eaves. The gable is highlighted with a parapet trimmed with pressed metal. A 12 feet (3.7 m) cast stone entrance arch with two panel doors in the face of the extension forms the main entry. Fenestration consists of long casement windows in front and smaller ones on the sides and in back. Above each is a small fixed window divided by muntins into eight triangular panes.

== History ==
Women volunteers promoted and staffed the early libraries of Auburn. In 1912, the city was promised $9,000 by Andrew Carnegie for a library. It opened in 1914. The land was donated by Mr. and Mrs. Authur C. Ballard, who originally had plated Auburn as the "Town of Slaughter." The donation contained a condition that the land would revert to the original owners when it ceased to be used for a library. The Carnegie building served the community for many years, but it ultimately proved too small to hold all the books and magazines it owned. In 1962, a $225,000 bond issue was approved by the voters and a new library opened in 1964. The proviso about the land being used for library purposes was then discovered and the property reverted to the Ballard family. It is a pure example of the typical Carnegie Library and is unaltered. The architect made a conscientious effort to incorporate all Carnegie's suggestions for library design, and all the elements of what Carnegie considered important are faithfully represented.

== See also ==
- National Register of Historic Places listings in King County, Washington
- Auburn Avenue Research Library on African American Culture and History – another library that is sometimes called "Auburn Library"

== Bibliography ==
- Morley, Roberta. The Official Book of the City of Auburn from 1891 to 1976. Auburn, WA 1976.
