= Bothell Pioneer Cemetery =

Historic cemetery in King County, Washington, US

- U.S. National Register of Historic Places
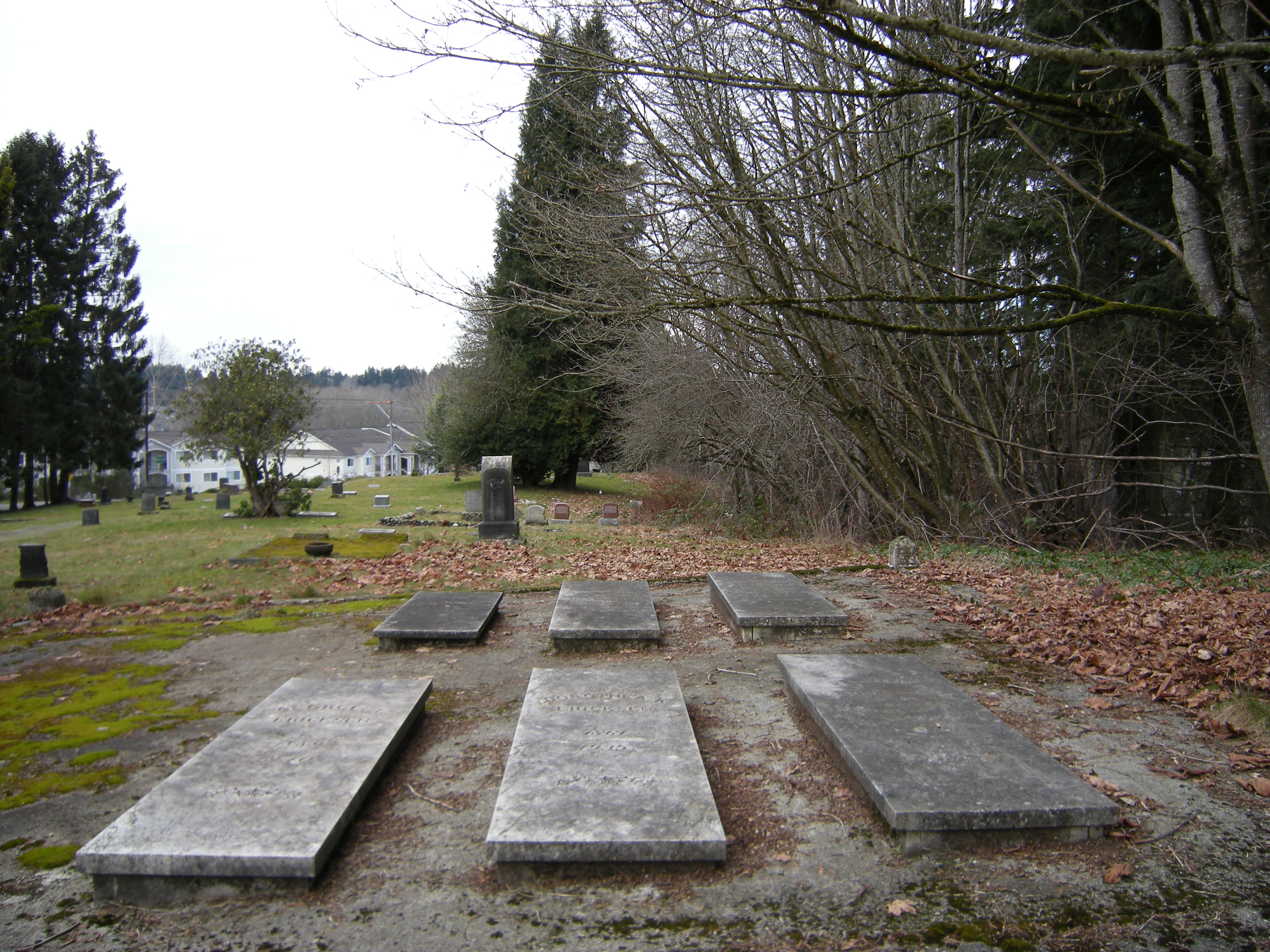
- View of part of the cemetery in 2009

- Location within Washington (state) Location within the United States
- Location: 108th Ave. NE and NE 180th St., Bothell, Washington
- Coordinates: 47°45′32″N 122°11′39″W
- Area: 5 acres (2.0 ha)
- Built: 1889
- MPS: Bothell MPS (64500695)
- NRHP reference No.: 96000050
- Added to NRHP: February 16, 1996

Bothell Pioneer Cemetery is a cemetery located in Bothell, Washington.

== Description and history ==
The cemetery lies on both the northeast and southeast corners of the junction of 180th Avenue NE and NE 180th Street. The initial .5 acres (0.20 ha) of land for the cemetery was provided by George Rutter Wilson for the burial of his children. He transferred ownership to the local Odd Fellows lodge in 1902. The city took over the cemetery in 1990. It was listed on the National Register of Historic Places on February 16, 1996.

== See also ==
- National Register of Historic Places listings in King County, Washington
