= James G. Eddy House and Grounds =

- U.S. National Register of Historic Places
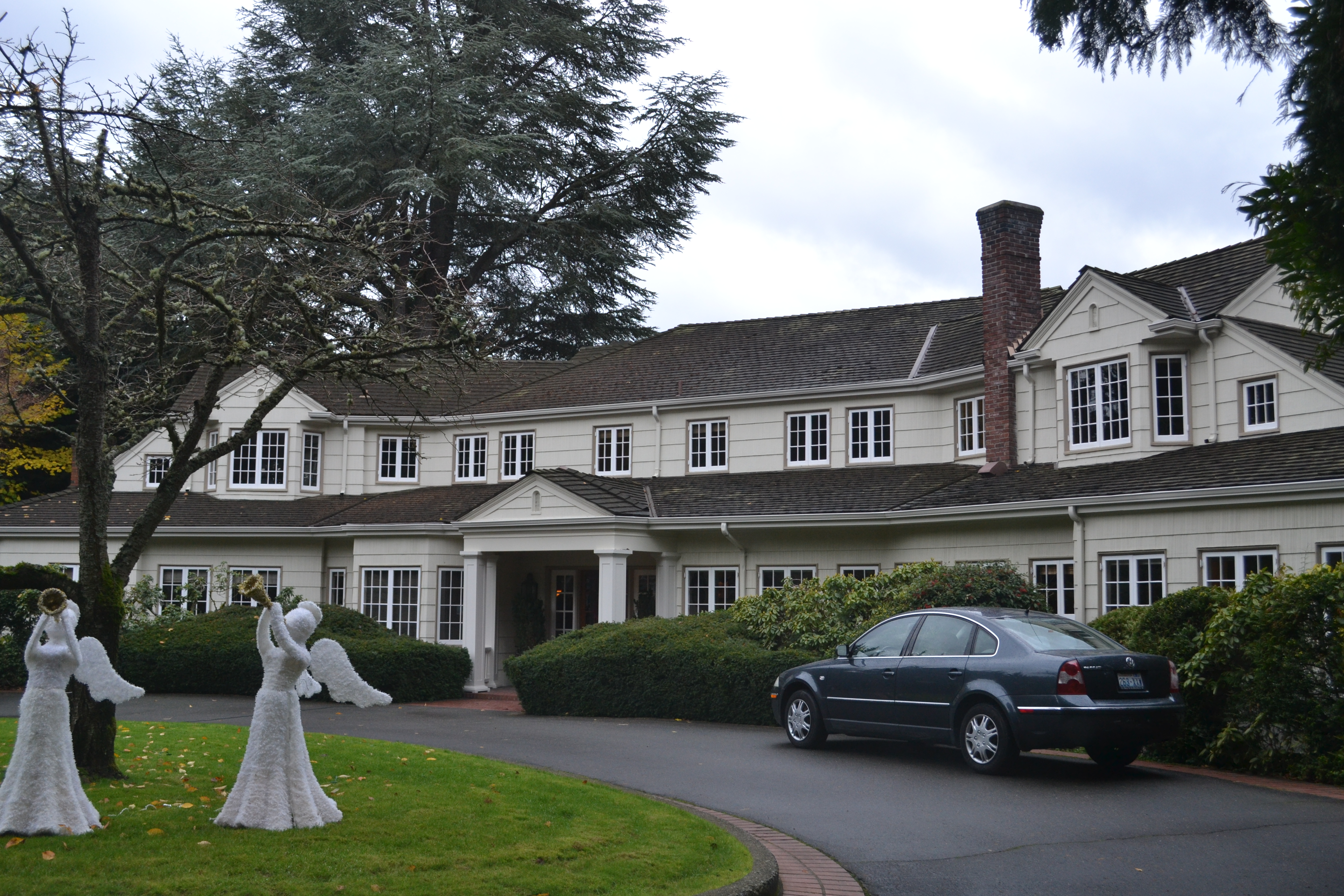
- The house in 2011

- Location within Washington (state) Location within the United States
- Location: 1005 Evergreen Point Road, Medina, Washington
- Coordinates: 47°37′11″N 122°14′23″W
- Area: less than one acre
- Built: 1925
- Built by: Howard Wright Sr.
- Landscape designer: Otto Holmdahl
- NRHP reference No.: 82004226
- Added to NRHP: February 19, 1982

The James G. Eddy House and Grounds is a historic property in Medina, Washington. The two-story mansion was built in 1925 for James Garfield Eddy. It has been listed on the National Register of Historic Places since February 19, 1982.
