= Horatio and Laura Allen Farm =

- U.S. National Register of Historic Places
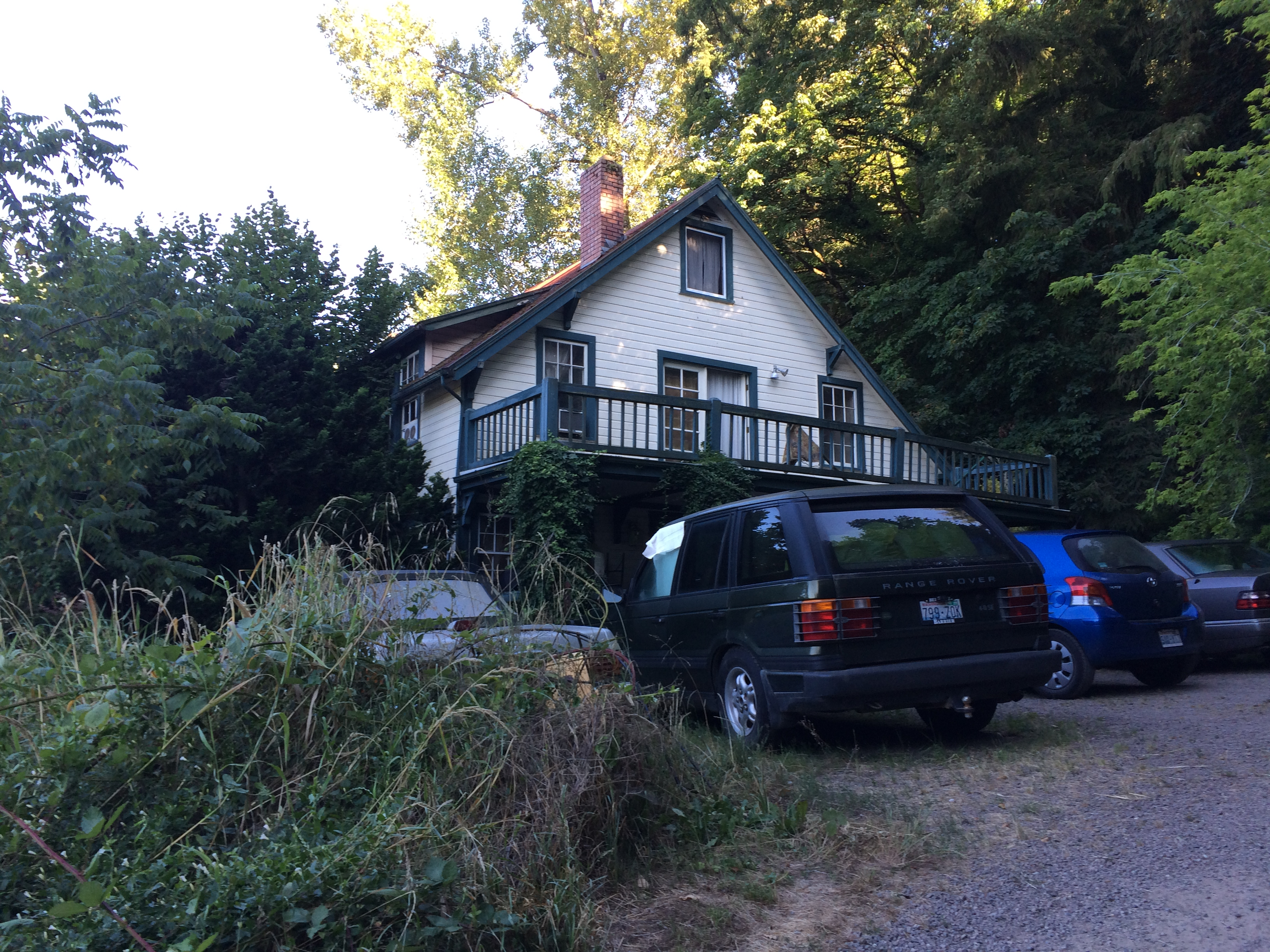
- Farmhouse in 2014

- Location within Washington (state) Location within the United States
- Nearest city: Duvall, Washington, U.S.
- Coordinates: 47.7511°N 121.9509°W
- Area: 65 acres (26 ha)
- Architectural style: American Craftsman\Bungalow
- MPS: Dairy Farm Properties of Snoqualmie River Valley, Washington MPS (64500783)
- NRHP reference No.: 02000250
- Added to NRHP: 22 March 2002

The Horatio and Laura Allen Farm is a historic farm property located in Duvall, Washington. It was listed on the National Register of Historic Places on March 22, 2002. The farm is an exemplary instance of a dairy farm in the Snoqualmie Valley, as one of the earliest and largest dairy farms in the area, situated against the hillside above Cherry Creek.

Horatio Lysander Allen came to the Pacific Northwest from Minnesota in 1883, and in 1884 settled near present-day Duvall. In 1902, he purchased 400 acres and began dairy farming. He served on the local school board, and the board of directors of the Duvall State Bank. He and his son Harry platted the town of Duvall.

The current farmhouse was built in 1924 to replace the previous farmhouse, which was lost to fire in 1923. Two large dairy barns and a free-standing milkhouse were built in 1926.

The new farmhouse was a large, two-story wood-frame dwelling with craftsman style features (a steeply pitched cross-gabled roof has broad shed-roofed wall dormers to the front and rear). While the original front entrance faced toward the old railroad right-of-way on the hillside, a southeast wing of the house was added in the 1980s with a formal entrance at ground level.

The farm remained in the Allen Family until sold in the 1950s, after which it was further subdivided into smaller parcels. About 65 of the original 400 acres are still attached to the farmhouse.

== See also ==
- Historic preservation
- History of agriculture in the United States
- National Register of Historic Places listings in King County, Washington
