= Sorenson House =

United States historic place

- U.S. National Register of Historic Places
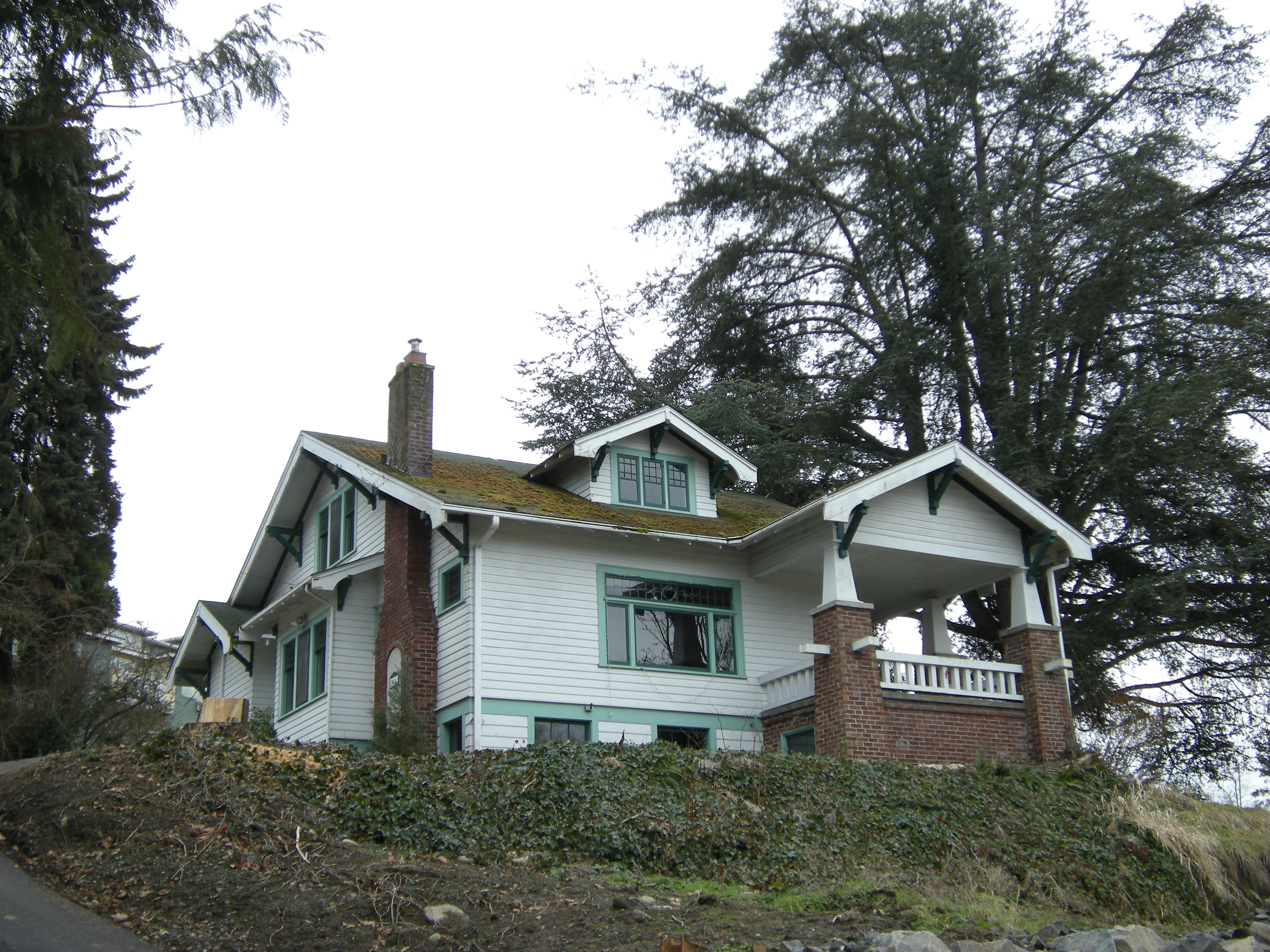
- The Sorenson House in 2009

- Location within Washington (state) Location within the United States
- Location: 10011 W. Riverside Dr., Bothell, Washington
- Coordinates: 47°45′23″N 122°12′19″W
- Area: less than 1 acre (0.40 ha)
- Built: 1922
- Built by: James Sorenson
- Architectural style: American Craftsman Bungalow
- MPS: Bothell MPS 64500695
- NRHP reference No.: 95000187
- Added to NRHP: 9 March 1995

The Sorenson House is a historic house located in Bothell, Washington. It was built in 1922 by James Sorenson and is an example of American Craftsman Bungalow architecture. The interior displays artistic heights of the American Arts and Crafts style. It was listed on the National Register of Historic Places (NRHP) on March 9, 1995.

== Setting ==
The City of Bothell is on the border of King and Snohomish counties in western Washington state. The Sammamish River crosses the south part of the city as it flows from Lake Sammamish on the southeast to Lake Washington to the northeast. Homes built on Bothell between 1905 and 1925 were suburban with post–Victorian and Craftsman styles. The Sorenson House was built in 1922 on a 4-acre (1.6 ha) parcel of land given to James Sorenson by his father in law Alfred Pearson. Pearson was a local logger and contemporary of the town's founder David Bothell. The property the house occupied when listed on the NRHP was the remaining 0.729 acres (0.295 ha). The house was moved about 600 feet (180 m) north to a single–family lot in 2015.

The original site was atop a steep north facing slope. The facade faced west and approach in 1994 was from the east, a route which passed Pearson's own home. It is unclear if the original approach was from this direction and the house was just oriented toward the best views or if there was a westerly approach leading to the facade and entrance.

== James Sorenson ==
James "Jim" Sorensen, a Danish immigrant, trained in shipbuilding as a carpenter before coming to America. In 1910 he married Mary Pearson and began a business partnership with William Schrotke in woodworking, cabinet making and contracting. He built many Craftsman style homes popular in architectural pattern books and enjoyed a good reputation. None of his other extant buildings display the degree of style and scale as his own home. In describing the home the NRHP nomination reads, "His talent and success at his trade are most evident in his beautifully executed home." and regarding the interior, "Mr. Sorenson, the builder, seeming used all his artistry in his own home to create a truly elegant setting." Sorenson died of tuberculosis in 1938.

== Building ==
The 1 1/2 story home has an irregular floor plan. It is complex but sturdy and orderly. Well ornamented with features like triangular knee braces and decoratively shaped barge boards covering the rafter ends over wide open eaves on the gable ends. With its bold geometric lines and smooth curves there is no suggestion of gingerbread. A multiplanar roof breaks the mass into comfortable orderly elements tied together with scale and balance. The low pitched gables on the facade with two symmetrical gabled projecting bays maintain a modest scale while the cross gabled corner porch extending north and wrapping east gives the building substantial mass and presence. The battered brick piers rising to halfway between porch floor and ceiling from ground level supporting tapered square wood columns add to the weight of the house and pilasters at the height of porch rail of the same board reinforce the Craftsman styling.

== See also ==
- National Register of Historic Places listings in King County, Washington
