= Brandes House =

Historic house in Washington, United States

- Ray Brandes House
- U.S. National Register of Historic Places
- Location within Washington (state)
- Location: 2202 212th Avenue SE, Sammamish, Washington
- Coordinates: 47°35′24.96″N 122°3′17.57″W
- Built: 1952
- Architect: Frank Lloyd Wright
- Architectural style: Usonian
- NRHP reference No.: 94001436
- Added to NRHP: 12/14/1994

The Ray Brandes House is a Frank Lloyd Wright–designed Usonian home located at 2202 212th Avenue SE, Sammamish, Washington. It was constructed in 1952. The home is constructed in Frank Lloyd Wright's Usonian style which is designed to create flow between nature, the home and its interior. It is one of the better preserved examples of this style, and one of three homes designed by Frank Lloyd Wright in Washington State. Landscaping was selected from local flora and fauna, typical of Frank Lloyd Wright's preference.

== See also ==
- List of Frank Lloyd Wright works
- National Register of Historic Places listings in King County, Washington
