= Lester Depot =

- U.S. National Register of Historic Places
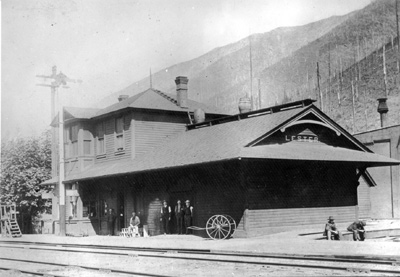

- Location within Washington (state)
- Location: US Forest Service Rd. 212, Green River Watershed, Lester, Washington
- Coordinates: 47°12′32″N 121°29′38″W
- Area: less than one acre
- Built by: Northern Pacific Railroad
- NRHP reference No.: 87001534
- Added to NRHP: September 10, 1987

The Lester Depot, also known as Northern Pacific Depot, was a railway station building located in Lester, Washington which was listed on the National Register of Historic Places in 1987.

It was built in 1886.

The building was torn down by the Burlington Northern railroad in 1992.

== See also ==
- National Register of Historic Places listings in King County, Washington

Preceding station	Northern Pacific Railway	Following station
Eagle Gorge toward Seattle or Tacoma	Main Line	Easton toward St. Paul
