= Auburn Post Office =

- U.S. National Register of Historic Places
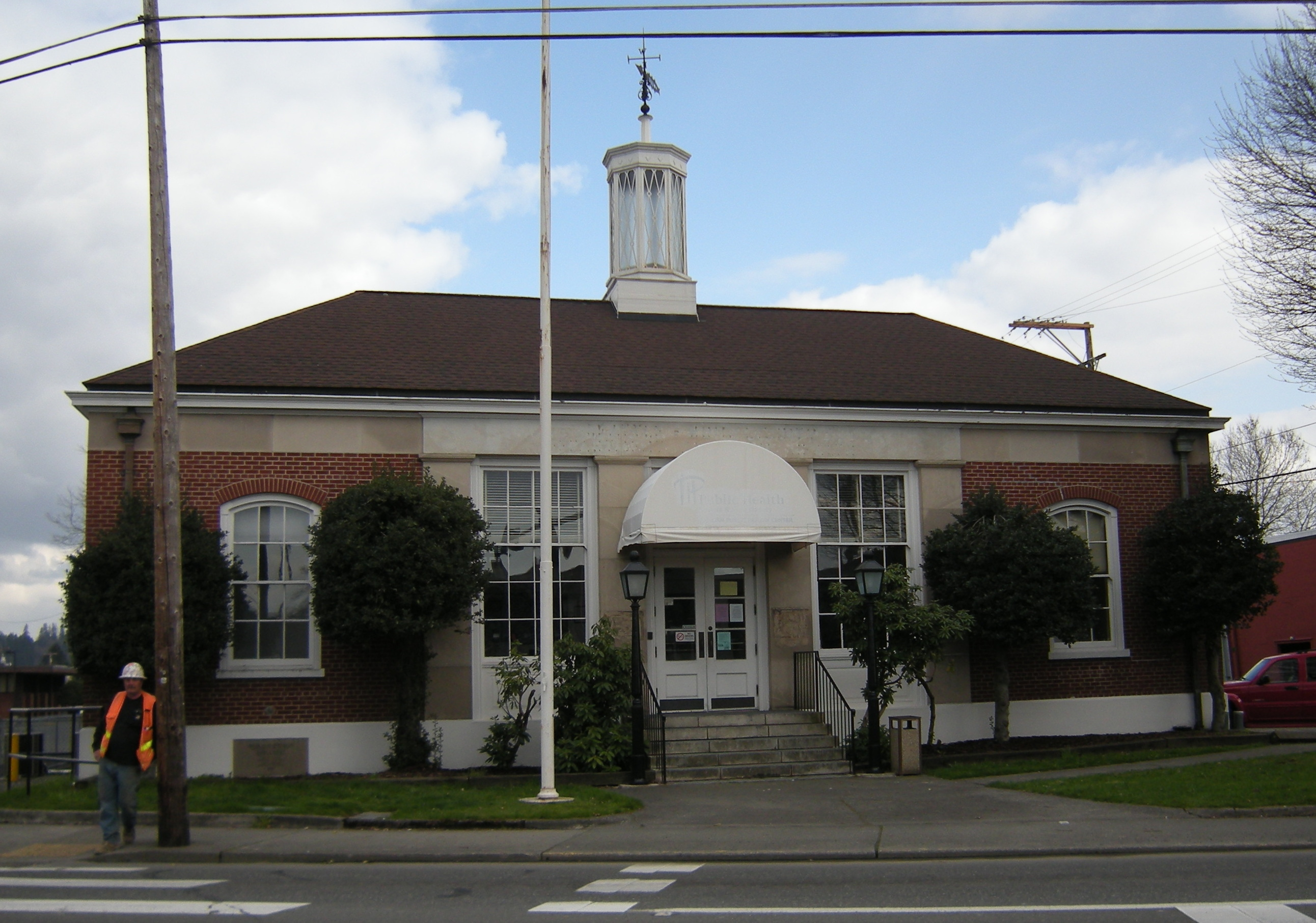

- Location within Washington (state)
- Location: 20 Auburn Ave. NE, Auburn, Washington
- Coordinates: 47°18′29″N 122°13′35″W
- Area: less than one acre
- Built: 1937
- Architect: Simon, Louis A.; Barnes, James I. Co.
- Architectural style: Modern Movement, Starved Classical
- MPS: Historic US Post Offices in Washington MPS
- NRHP reference No.: 00000407
- Added to NRHP: April 21, 2000

The former Auburn Post Office building is located at 20 Auburn Avenue NE at First Street NE in Auburn, Washington. This is one block north Main Street, the historic business and commercial center. The main entrance is the west face on Auburn Avenue.

== Exterior ==
The former Post Office is a small, single-purpose building. Constructed in 1937 as a one-story building, 60.66 feet (18.49 m) wide by 83 feet (25 m) long, with a covered loading platform in back. The exterior is red brick on a poured concrete foundation with sandstone trim elements. These include a horizontal band below the cornice, and engaged sandstone piers adjacent to the main entry.

In the center of the front façade are five granite steps flanked by original wrought-iron ornamental lampposts. The wooden double entry doors have a transom windows above and large rectangular windows on either side. The remaining windows are gently arched wood windows with divided lights and poured concrete sills. Each features a soldier course of red brick at the headers.

The roof is a lateral hip, with a metal cupola featuring glass panes and a weathervane. An east-facing skylight with operable windows runs along the base of the hipped roof. The original roof was tile. A raised, covered loading dock was constructed at the rear of the building. A cornerstone on the northwest corner of the front facade provides the names of the architect and the supervising engineer, the Postmaster General, and the Secretary of the Treasury that year.

== Interior ==
The building has an L-shaped lobby, 14 feet (4.3 m) wide and 46 feet (14 m) on the front and 32 feet (9.8 m) on the back or south side. The postal clerk's counter and windows ran nearly the length of the lobby with the post box area located at the south end. A full wall with grilled postal clerk windows separated the public and private functions of the post office. Interior finish materials in the lobby area included Alaskan marble wainscoting, mahogany window and door trim, and terrazzo flooring. The building contained 11 rooms, including restrooms, work rooms and Postmaster's office, and a full basement with storage, fuel and boiler rooms.

== Present appearance ==
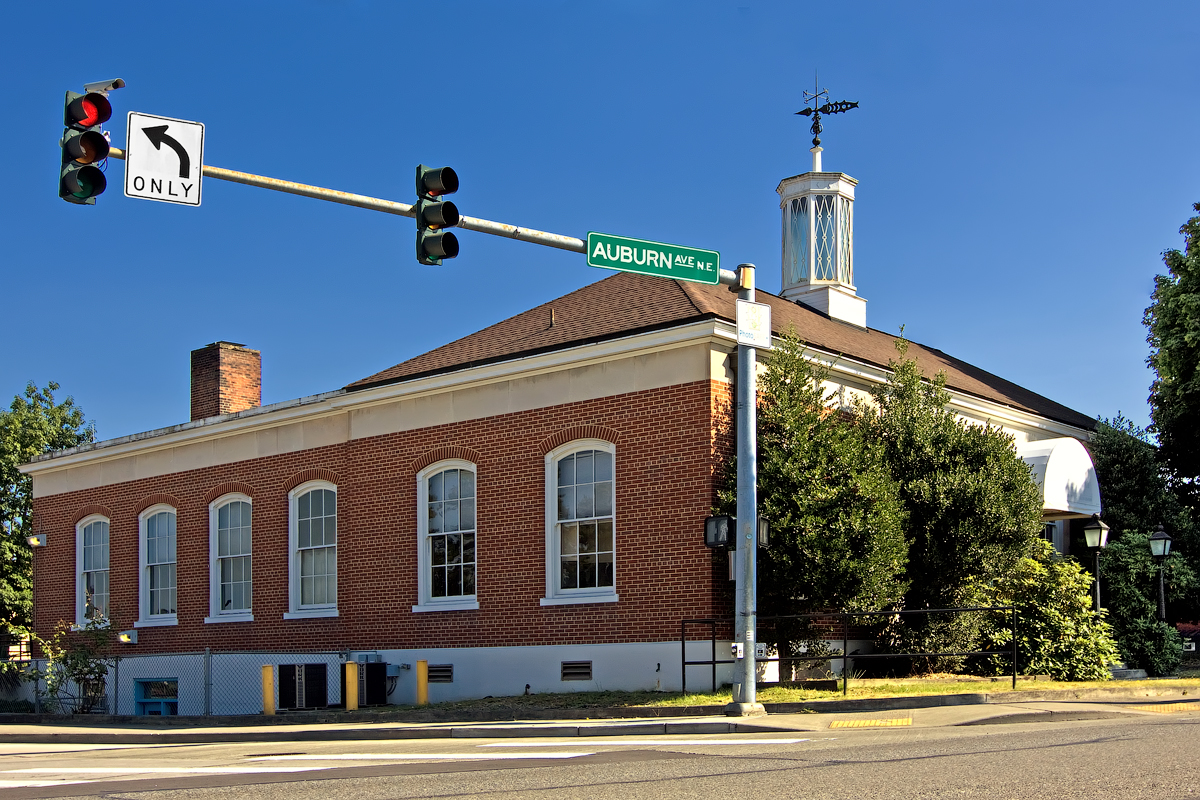
Auburn Post Office with addition to the back

The former Auburn Post Office building was purchased by the King County Department of Public Health and remodeled for use as a health clinic in 1964. The exterior alterations include construction of a 19 feet (5.8 m) long by 22 feet (6.7 m) deep brick addition to the rear covered loading dock; construction of an ADA accessible ramp along the north side leading to a basement entrance; installation of an arched fabric awning over the primary building entrance; and the addition of new building signage. The changes are not visible from the front. The roof has been changed from tile to asphalt shingles but the original cupola still crowns the building.

The building interior was extensively remodeled in 1964. Spaces were sub-divided to create smaller offices and exam rooms, the lobby/reception area was reconfigured as the wall originally separating the post office lobby area from the back-of-the-house was removed and replaced with a reception counter, and the rear addition was added to create a nurse's work room. The buildings interior bears little resemblance to its historic use as a post office.

== See also ==
- National Register of Historic Places listings in King County, Washington

== Bibliography ==
- Abel, Don G. The Works Program of the Works Progress Administration in the State of Washington, A Narrative Report to the People of Our State. Report by Works Progress Administrator, 1937.
- "Auburn Historic Main Street Tour." (Brochure) Auburn: City of Auburn Planning and Community Development Department, 1991.
- "Auburn Historic Sites Tour," (Brochure) Auburn: City of Auburn Planning and Community Development Department, 1991.
- Bagley, Clarence B. History of King County Washington, Vol. 1. Chicago: SJ. Clarke Publishing Co., 1929
- Bruns, James H. Great American Post Offices. Washington, D.C.: Preservation Press; New York: John Wiley & Sons, Inc., 1998.
- Dorpat, Paul and Genevieve McCoy. Building Washington: A History of Washington State Public Works. Seattle: Tartu Publications, 1998.
- Grosvenor, Beth. National Register of Historic Places Bulletin 13: How to Apply National Register Criteria to Post Offices. Washington, D.C.: U.S. Department of the Interior, Fall 1984.
- Kolva, H. J. and Steve Franks. Historic U.S. Post Offices in Washington 1893–1941. National Register of Historic Places Multiple Property Documentation Form. August, 1989.
- Morley, Roberta C., Ed. City of Auburn 1891–1976. Auburn: City of Auburn, 1976.
- Park, Marlene and Gerald Markowitz. Democratic Vistas: Post Offices and Public Art in the New Deal. Philadelphia: Temple University Press, 1984.
- U.S. Public Works Administration. America Builds: The Record of the PWA. Washington, D.C.: U.S. Government Printing Office, 1939.
- Vine, Josephine Emmons. Auburn—A Look Down Main Street. Auburn: City of Auburn, 1991.
- Williams, J. Kerwin. Grants-In-Aid Under the Public Works Administration: A Study in Federal-State-Local Relations. New York: Columbia University Press, 1939.

Local Newspaper Articles:

- "Treasury Calls for Bids on Post Office Sites in Auburn." The Auburn News, 20 November 1936.
- "Treasury Dept. Asks Bids for P.O. Location." Auburn Globe Republican, 20 November 1936.
- "Public Hearing Held in Regard to P.O. Site." The Auburn News, 11 December 1936.
- "Postal Department Scans Sites for New Building." Auburn Globe Republican, 11 December 1936.
- "Lots in Ballard Addition Selected for P.O. Site." The Auburn News, 22 January 1937.
- "To Open Post Office Bldg. Bids July 9th." The Auburn News, 4 June 1937.
- "Eastern Firm Low Bidder on P.O. Building." The Auburn News, 16 July 1937.
- "Construction Supt. for P.O. Building Arrives." The Auburn News, 13 August 1937.
- "Start Work on New Post Office Building." The Auburn News, 20 August 1937.
- "Parley to Lay Cornerstone Here." The Auburn News, 15 October 1937.
- "Parley Scheduled to Lay new Post Office Cornerstone at 11:55 o'Clock This Morning." Auburn Globe Republican, 15 October 1937.
- "Parley Speaks to 2,000 Here at P.O. Rites." Auburn Globe Republican, 22 October 1937. '
- "Open for Public Inspection Tuesday Night: Auburn's New Post Office Building." The Auburn News, 25 March 1938.
- Mary G. Wilkinson. "History of the Auburn Post Office." Auburn Globe Republican, 25 March 1938.
- "New Post Office Building Ready for Inspection Here Tuesday: Program Arranged." Auburn Globe Republican, 1 April 1938.
