= John and Kate Dougherty Farmstead =

- Dougherty, John and Kate, Farmstead
- U.S. National Register of Historic Places
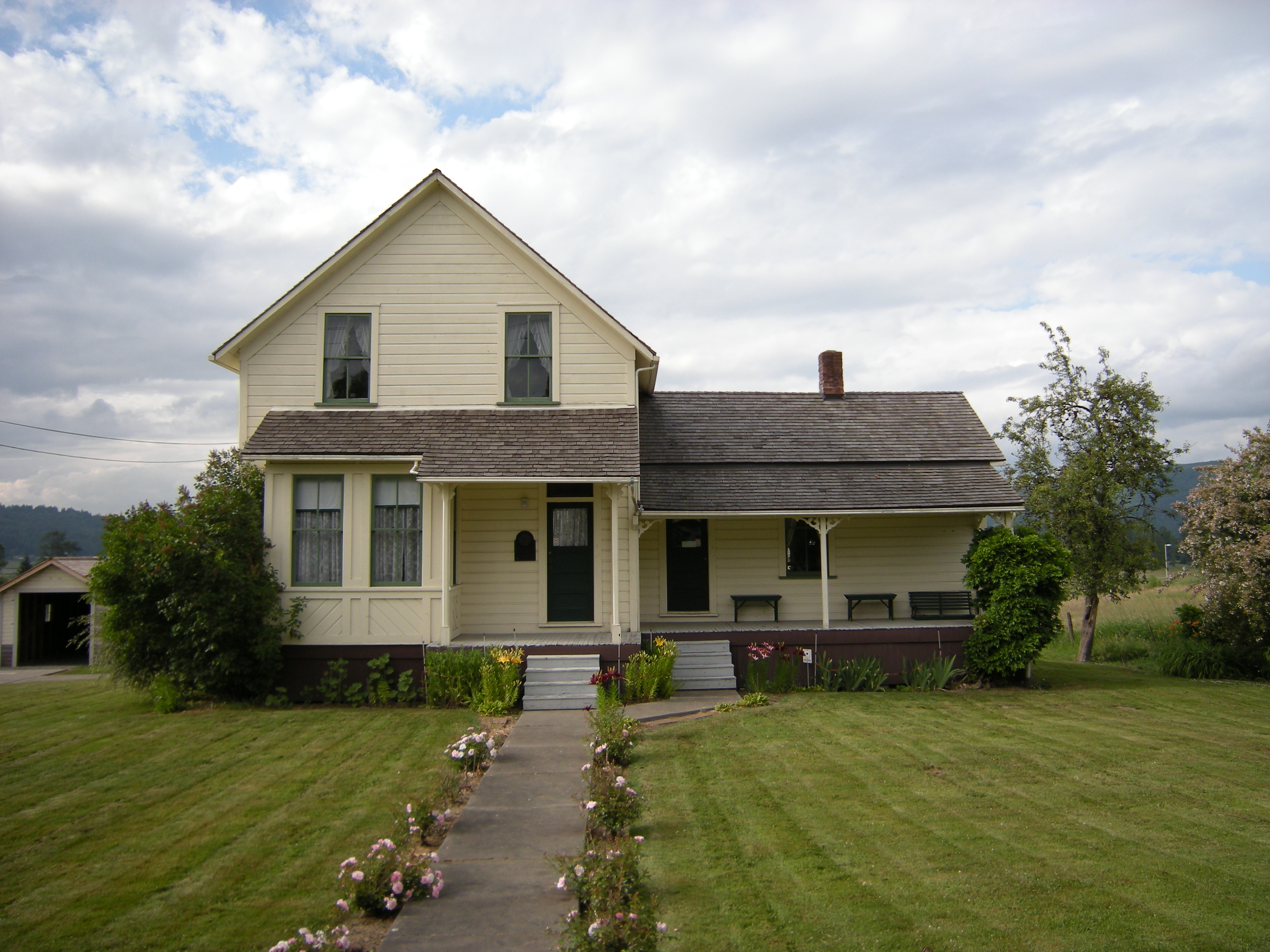

- Location within Washington (state)
- Location: 26524 NE Cherry Valley Rd., Duvall, Washington
- Coordinates: 47.74782°N 121.98392°W
- Area: 21.3 acres (8.6 ha)
- Built: 1888
- NRHP reference No.: 05001353
- Added to NRHP: December 1, 2005

The John and Kate Dougherty Farmstead is a farmstead located in Duvall, Washington, United States, listed on the National Register of Historic Places.

== See also ==
- National Register of Historic Places listings in King County, Washington
