= Pickering Farm =

Historic barn and farm in Issaquah, Washington, U.S.

Coordinates: 47°33′0″N 122°2′57″W

- U.S. National Register of Historic Places
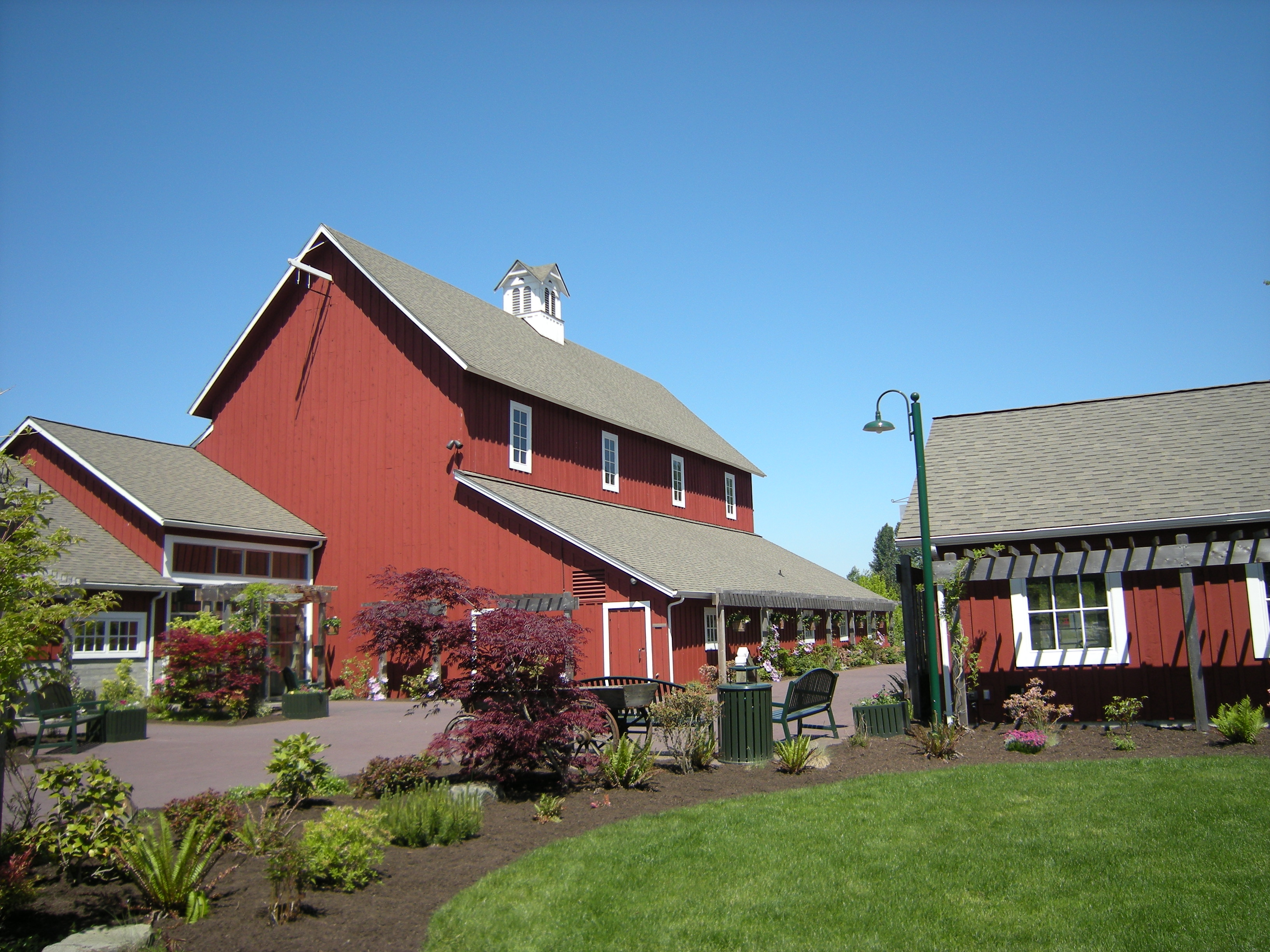

- Location within Washington (state)
- Location: 21809 SE 56th St., Issaquah, Washington
- Area: 86 acres (35 ha)
- Built: 1890
- NRHP reference No.: 83003343
- Added to NRHP: July 7, 1983

Pickering Farm is a former farm located in Issaquah, Washington listed on the National Register of Historic Places. It has been the site for a farmer's market since the late 1990s. Pickering Barn is available for rental.

== See also ==
- National Register of Historic Places listings in King County, Washington
