= Dr. Reuben Chase House =

Historic house in Bothell, Washington, United States

- U.S. National Register of Historic Places
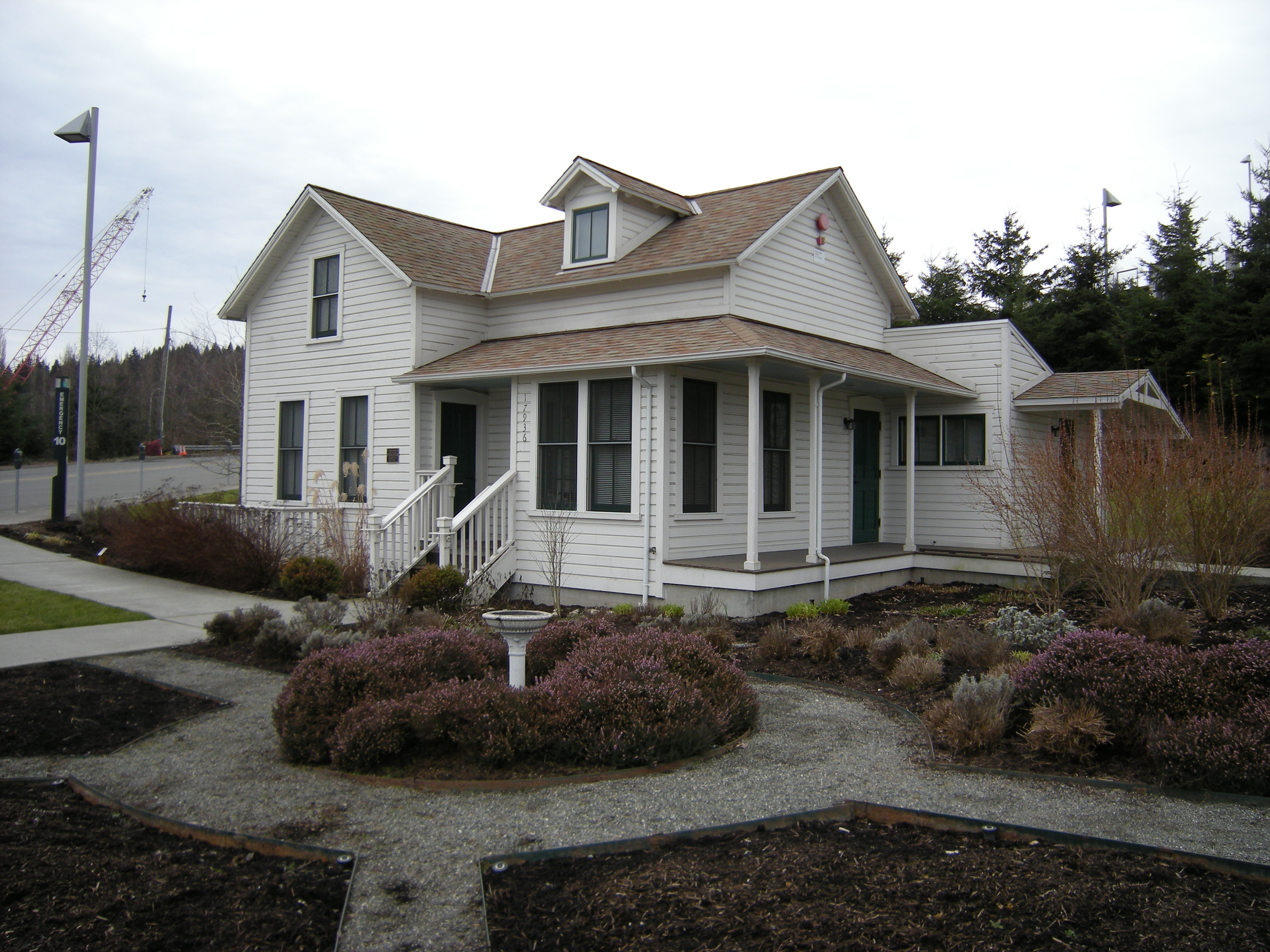

- Location within Washington (state)
- Location: 17819 113th Ave. NE, Bothell, Washington
- Coordinates: 47°45′27″N 122°11′20″W
- Area: less than one acre
- Built: 1885
- Architectural style: Gable front and wing
- MPS: Bothell MPS
- NRHP reference No.: 90001246
- Added to NRHP: August 27, 1990

The Dr. Reuben Chase House is a historic house located in Bothell, Washington, United States, listed on the National Register of Historic Places. Built in 1885 in a small settlement along the Sammamish River known as Stringtown, It was occupied by Bothell's first doctor, Reuben Chase starting in 1889 and served as his residence, office and the city's first hospital. Still in its original location, the house was fully restored in 2001 and is now part of the University of Washington Bothell campus, housing the Commuter Services office for the college.

== See also ==
- National Register of Historic Places listings in King County, Washington
