= Louis and Ellen Olson House =

Historic house in Washington, United States

- U.S. National Register of Historic Places
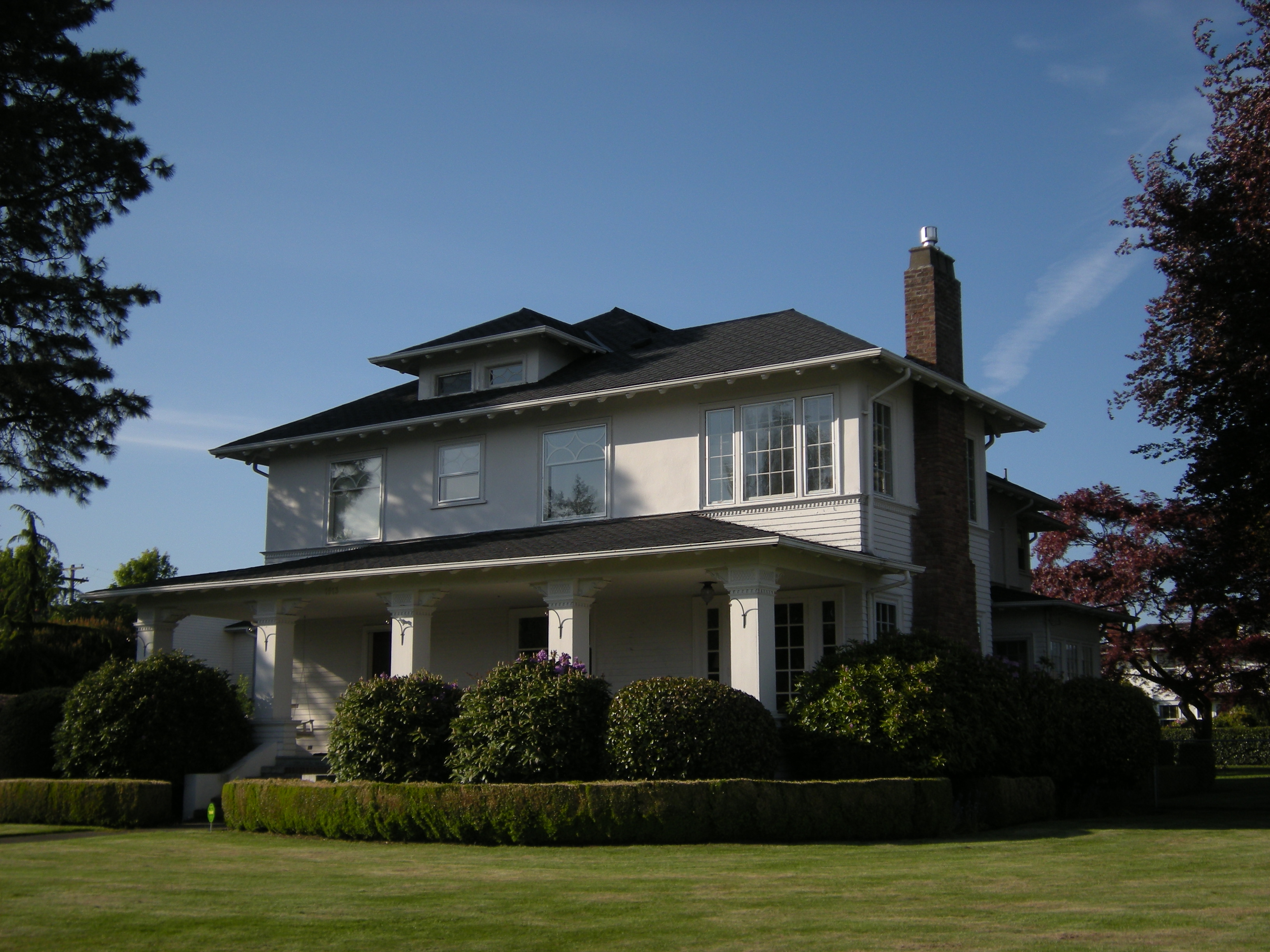
- Louis and Ellen Olson House

- Location within Washington (state)
- Location: 1513 Griffin Avenue; Enumclaw, Washington
- Coordinates: 47°12′20″N 121°59′30″W
- Area: 0.57 acres (0.23 ha)
- Built: 1903
- Architect: W.C.Claude House
- Architectural style: Craftsman
- NRHP reference No.: 84003492
- Added to NRHP: 1984

The Louis and Ellen Olson House, a Craftsman style mansion built in 1903, is located near downtown Enumclaw, Washington, United States. It has been listed on the National Register of Historic Places since 1984. The mansion is currently a private residence.
