= Dockton Hotel =

- U.S. National Register of Historic Places
- Location within Washington (state) Location within the United States
- Location: SW 260th St. and 99th Ave. SW, Dockton, Washington
- Coordinates: 47°22′15″N 122°27′38″W
- Area: 1.5 acres (0.61 ha)
- Built: 1917
- Built by: John A. Martinolich
- NRHP reference No.: 83003337
- Added to NRHP: July 28, 1983

The Dockton Hotel, also known as Dockton School, was a building in Dockton, Washington on Maury Island. Built in 1917, it was added to the National Register of Historic Places in 1993. It was the largest remaining structure from the days when Dockton was primarily a ship-building town. As of 2008, the building is presumed to be demolished due to its collapse.

== History ==
The Dockton Hotel was built to house employees of John A. Martinolich's shipyard. It was a 2 1/2-story rectangular wood structure with an open porch and four pillars supporting the porch roof.

After World War I, business for the shipyard declined and the boardinghouse was no longer needed. The building was sold to be used as a school. After serving as the community's elementary school for 20 years, the property was bought in 1944 by Theodore Berry, a Dockton postmaster, WPA Administrator, and general storekeeper, who turned it into a berry cannery. The building later became a private residence, and then was vacant for some years.
