= William and Estella Adair Farm =

Historic place in Carnation, Washington, US

- U.S. National Register of Historic Places
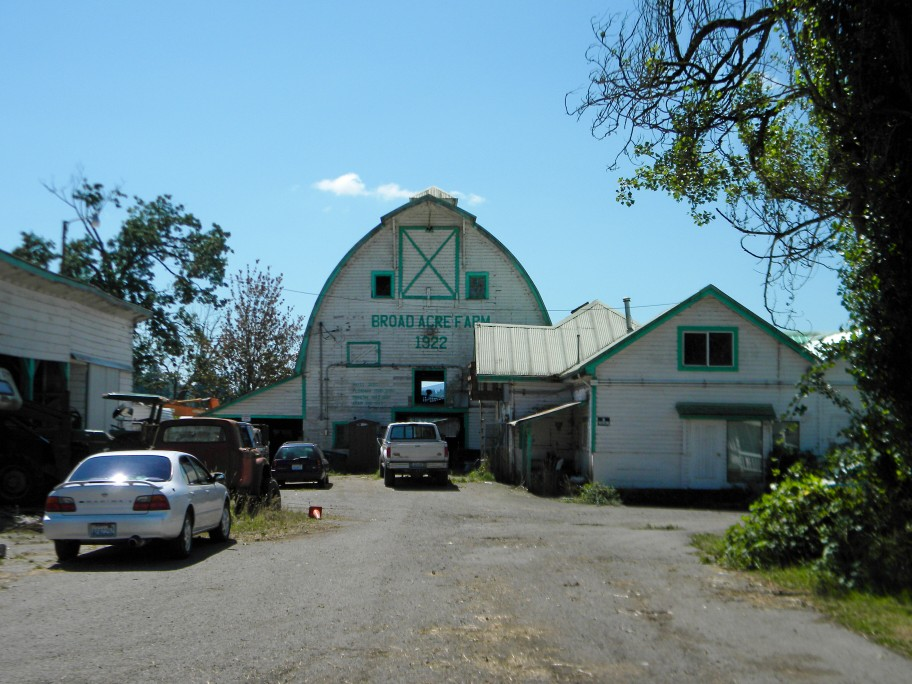
- Adair Farm

- Location within Washington (state) Location within the United States
- Location: 27929 NE 100th St., Carnation, Washington
- Coordinates: 47°41′05″N 121°57′50″W
- Area: 115 acres (47 ha)
- Built: 1910
- Architectural style: Bungalow/craftsman
- MPS: Dairy Farm Properties of Snoqualmie River Valley, Washington MPS
- NRHP reference No.: 02000249
- Added to NRHP: March 22, 2002

The William and Estella Adair Farm, named the Broadacre Farm in 1922, is a 115-acre dairy farm in Carnation, Washington, United States, that illustrates the evolution of a typical dairy farming operation in the Snoqualmie Valley. Established in 1910, it was added to the National Register of Historic Places in 2002.

== History ==
The farm was established in 1910 on the west bank of the Snoqualmie River. Structures on the property include a Craftsman bungalow residence, a hay barn, a milk house, a milking parlor, woodshed, and other outbuildings.

The residence, built in 1915, is a 1 1/2-story wood-frame bungalow with a side gable. The hay barn, added in 1922, is notable as the earliest extant example in the Snoqualmie Valley of the use of the bow truss or Gothic arch for the roof.

One of the first milking parlors in the county was installed at Broadacre Farm in about 1950. The milking parlor and milk house are part of a complex of four adjoining buildings. The complex, with additions made through the 1990s, is integrated with the hay barn.

The Adairs sold the Broadacre Farm to Peter Sinnema in 1945. Sinnema expanded the existing farm complex by constructing loafing sheds on either side of the barn, adding a new tank house, and building a new Surge six-in-a-line milking parlor, one of first to be installed in the valley. Later additions include large detached loafing sheds, a new herringbone milking parlor designed for 16 cows, and a modern milk house with a 22,000 gallon tank.

For many years, Broadacre Farm was the site for the annual Snoqualmie Valley Pioneer Picnic, which the Adair family first hosted in 1923. Broadacre Farm was a working dairy farm until the mid-1990s.
