= Erick Gustave Sanders Mansion =

- Sanders, Erick Gustave, Mansion
- U.S. National Register of Historic Places
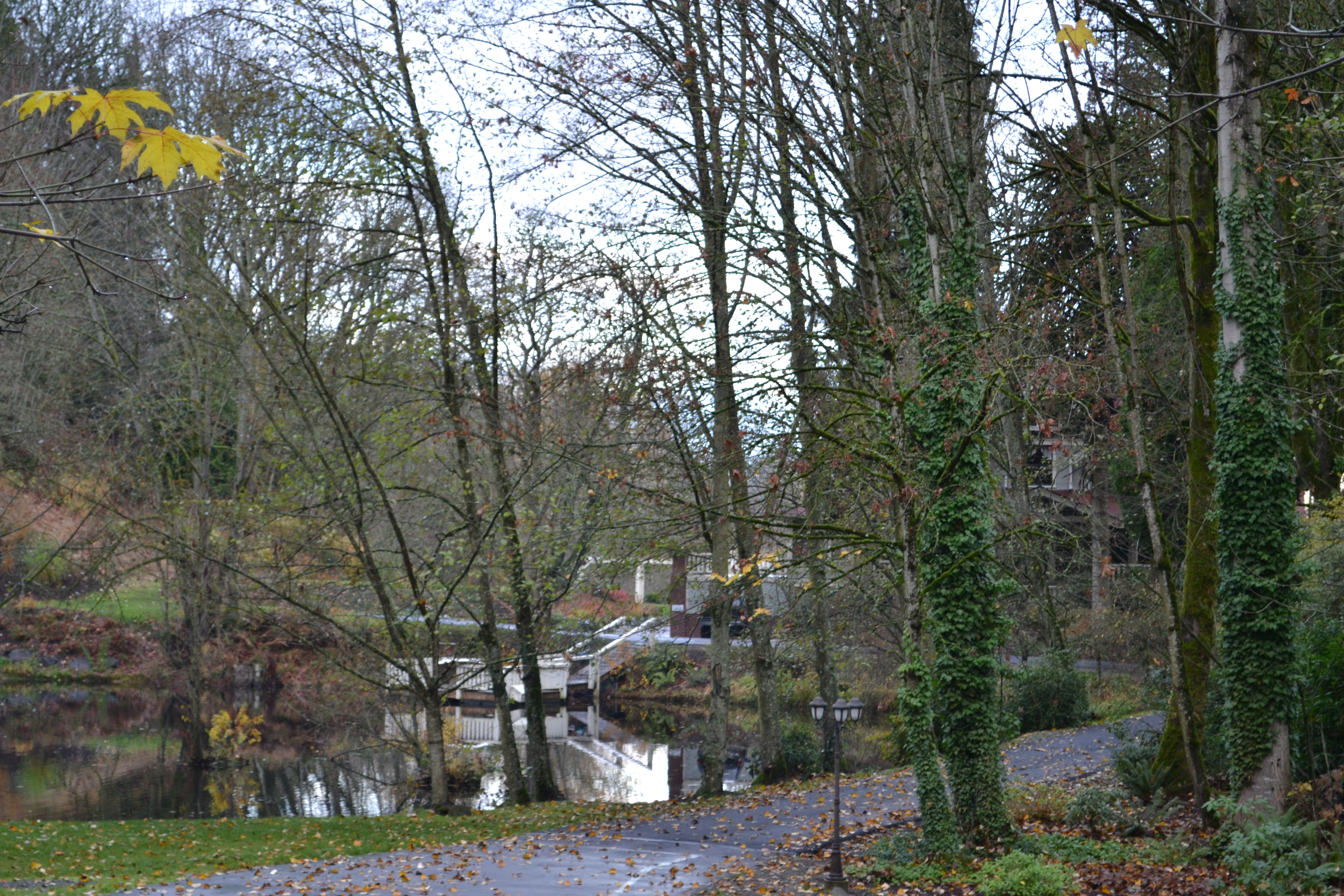
- Sanders Mansion

- Location within Washington (state) Location within the United States
- Nearest city: Kent, Washington
- Coordinates: 47°21′17″N 122°15′50″W
- Area: 6.1 acres (2.5 ha)
- Built: 1912
- Architectural style: Bungalow/craftsman
- NRHP reference No.: 86003163
- Added to NRHP: November 6, 1986

The Erick Gustave Sanders Mansion is a private residence located in the Green River Valley outside of Kent, Washington. Built in 1912, the property was added to the National Register of Historic Places in 1986.

== Description ==
The mansion is a Craftsman style two-story foursquare wood-frame house on 6.08 acres (2.46 ha). Three sides of the house are surrounded by a deep verandah. The ground floor contains a living room, dining room, kitchen, pantry, library, maid's room, and a bathroom. Upstairs are four bedrooms and a bathroom. All of the rooms are finished with dark-stained fir woodwork.

== History ==
Erick Sanders was a Swedish immigrant and president of the Standard Investment Company. With two partners, he purchased 660 acres (270 ha) near Kent, where they established the Standard Dairy and Standard Mill. Sanders built his mansion adjacent to the dairy, using lumber from his own mill. He obtained the stained glass for the home from the Alaska–Yukon–Pacific Exposition.

Sanders died unexpectedly, two years after completing the estate. The property went to his daughter, and then was sold. In 1942, Harold Stewart purchased the mansion and lived there for around 40 years. The house and grounds deteriorated during Stewart's ownership.

In 1986, the Advent Christian Church of Seattle purchased the property and began restoration. The church would hold services in the living room. The church sold the property in 2005, and it has had several owners since.
