= Lilly Kirk House =

Historic house in Washington, United States

- U.S. National Register of Historic Places
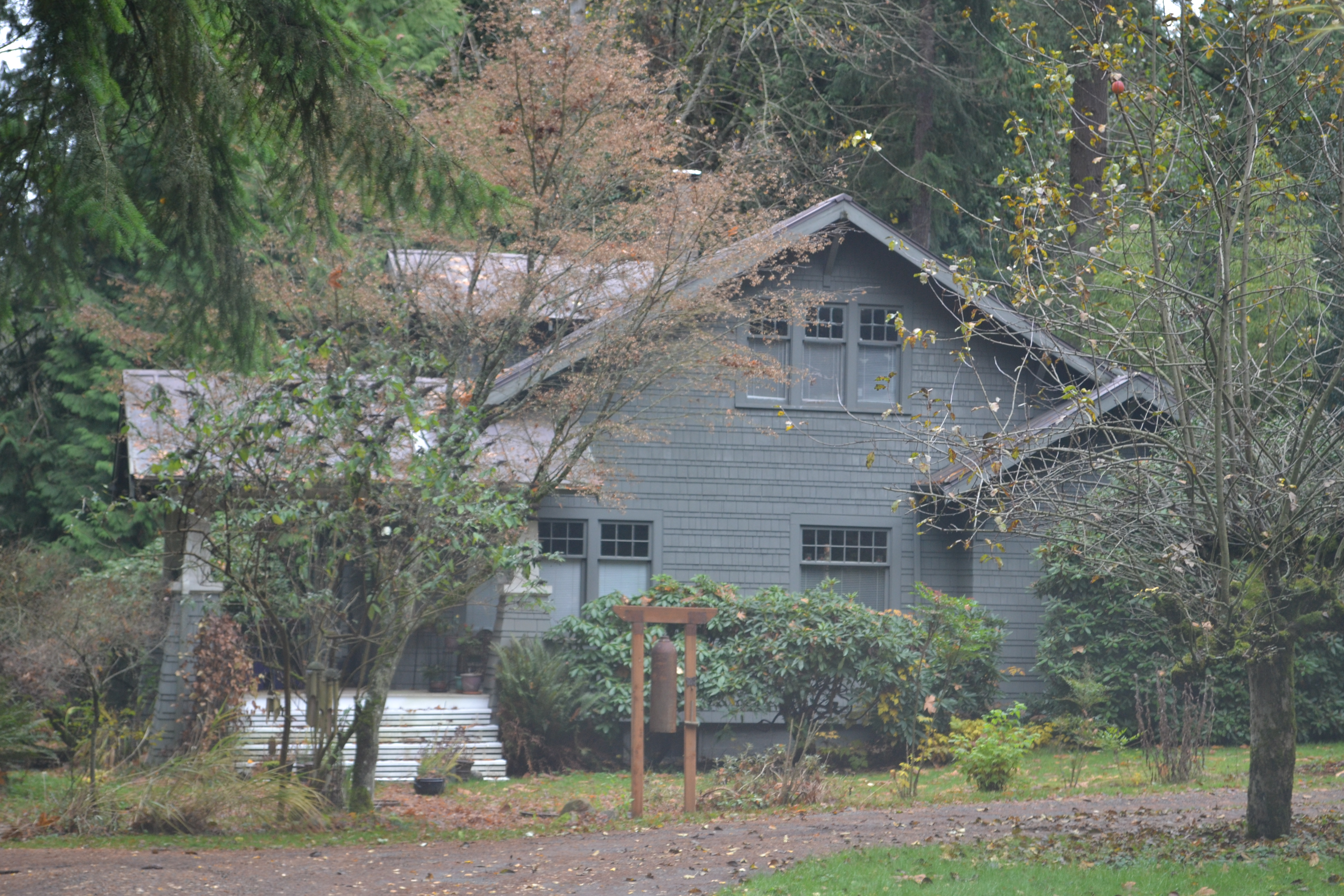
- The house's exterior in 2011

- Location within Washington (state) Location within the United States
- Location: 19619 100th Ave. NE, Bothell, Washington
- Coordinates: 47°46′15″N 122°12′28″W
- Area: 4.4 acres (1.8 ha)
- Built: 1923
- Built by: W.C. Mortenson
- Architectural style: American Craftsman
- MPS: Bothell MPS (64500695)
- NRHP reference No.: 95000188
- Added to NRHP: 9 March 1995

The Lilly Kirk House is a historic house built in 1923 and located in Bothell, Washington in King County.

== Description and history ==
The house was built by W.C. "Bill" Mortenson in 1923 and is an example of the American Craftsman style of architecture. The one and a half story wood-frame house sits on a concrete foundation and has a gabled shingle roof. It displays the low pitched gabled roof with wide open eaves, exposed rafters and ornamented braces characteristic of the American Craftsman style. Exterior wall finishing is alternating narrow and wide stained wood shingle. The house is at the rear of a 4.4-acre (1.8 ha) lot in the Maywood / Beckstrom Hill neighborhood in Bothell. Lawrence and Lilly Kirk owned a business in Bothell and Mortenson, Lilly Kirk's brother, was a Seattle builder and contractor who later moved his business to Bothell. It was listed on the National Register of Historic Places on March 9, 1995.

== See also ==
- Historic preservation
- National Register of Historic Places listings in King County, Washington
