= Tukwila School =

Historic building in Washington, USA

- U.S. National Register of Historic Places
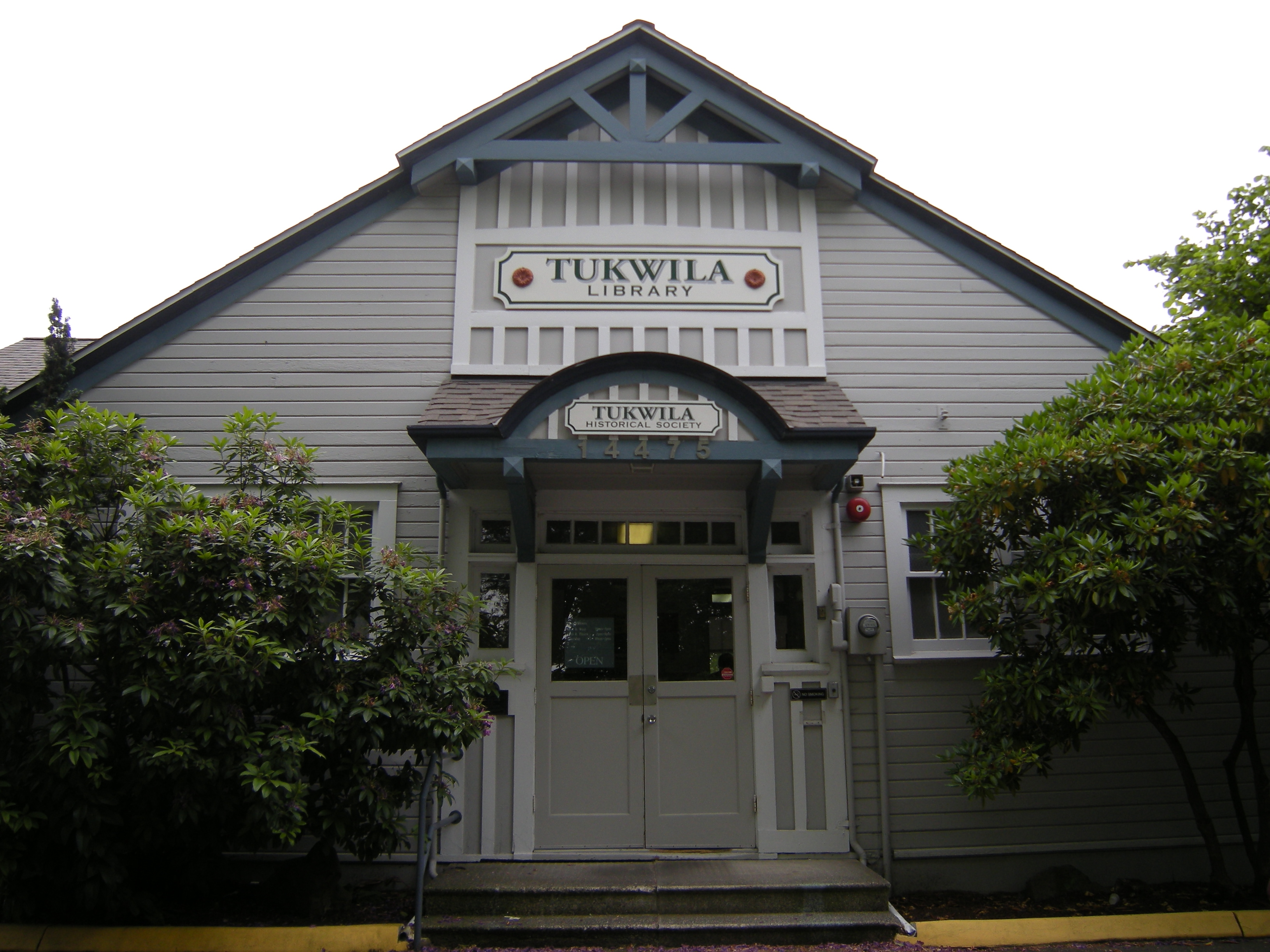
- Former Tukwila School building

- Location within Washington (state)
- Location: 14475 59th Ave., S., Tukwila, Washington
- Coordinates: 47°28′20″N 122°15′25″W
- Built: 1920
- NRHP reference No.: 79002544
- Added to NRHP: November 29, 1979

The Tukwila School, later known as Tukwila Town Hall and Tukwila Library, is a public building in Tukwila, Washington. Built in 1920, the former school was added to the National Register of Historic Places in 1979.

== History ==
Tukwila School is a single-story wood-frame building that contained two classrooms. Children in grades one through six attended the school until 1946. When the school was closed, the building was purchased by the city of Tukwila, which then used it as its Town Hall from 1947 to 1978. From 1980 to 2010, the building became the Tukwila Library. The Tukwila Historical Society leased the building in 2010 and renamed it the Tukwila Heritage and Cultural Center.
