= Oscar Blomeen House =

Historic house in Washington, United States

- U.S. National Register of Historic Places
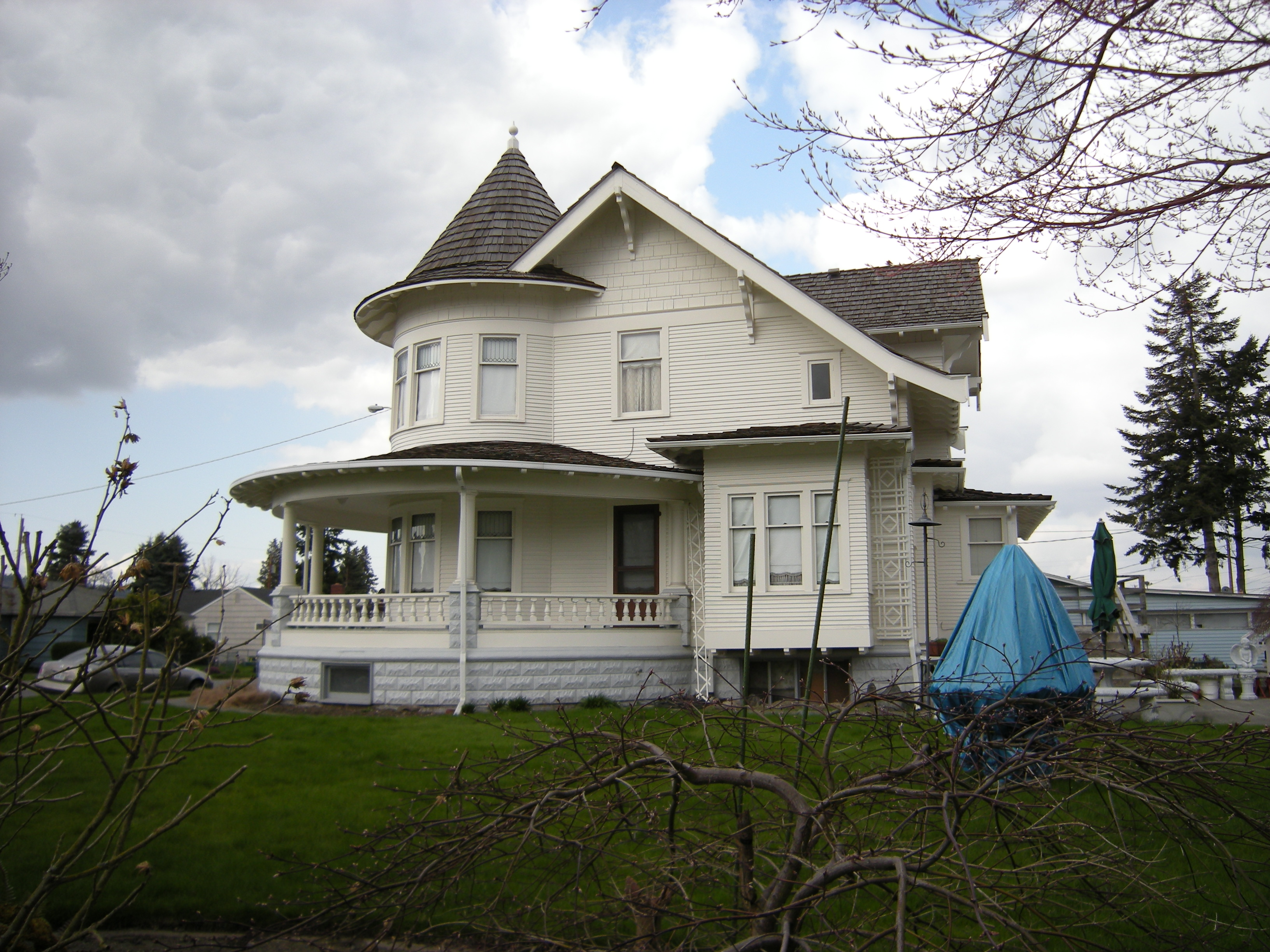

- Location within Washington (state)
- Location: 324 B St NE, Auburn, Washington
- Coordinates: 47°18′40″N 122°13′35″W
- Built: 1913-1914
- Architect: Oscar Blomeen
- Architectural style: Bungalow/Craftsman, Vernacular Late Victorian
- NRHP reference No.: 91000781
- Added to NRHP: June 21, 1991

The Oscar Blomeen House is a historic house located in Auburn, Washington. It was added to the National Register of Historic Places in 1991.

== History ==
Oscar Frederick Blomeen (1876-1969) and Ellen (Wennergren) Blomeen (1873-1950) were immigrants from Uddevalla in Västra Götaland, Sweden. They came to America in 1901 and were married during 1908 in Springfield, Massachusetts. After locating in Washington state, Oscar and his brother, Carl opened a machine shop in Auburn. Oscar and Ellen were the parents of three children. After the birth of their children, Oscar planned and built a larger home for his family. The house built by Oscar Blomeen between 1913 and 1914. The family moved out of the house in 1917 when Oscar went to work at the navy shipyard in Bremerton, Washington. Oscar Blomeen rented the house out to a group of nurses (called the Stone Sisters) who turned the home into the area's first hospital. During the 1920s, the house was also used as a maternity hospital.

== Exterior ==
The front entry is a single door with glazed upper panel, flanked by multipaned sidelights. A single leaf side entry allows access on the south side of the house. The front and south side have a sheltered veranda that extends 8 feet (2.4 m) from the facade. The veranda has a wood deck, Tuscan columns on concrete block bases, and a plain architrave. East of the veranda on the south side is a box bay window under a hipped roof.

Behind the house is a one-story frame house built in 1911. This is the original Blomeen home. The house has clapboard siding. The once open front porch has been enclosed. It is not a contributing resource. Nearby is an historic two-car garage, with clapboard siding and parapet.

== Interior ==
The interior is about 1,100 square feet (100 m^{2}) on an open plan. There are four rooms on the first floor (front parlor, sitting room, formal dining room, and kitchen) and four rooms on the second floor. First floor ceilings are 9 feet (2.7 m)high, the second floor ceilings are 8 feet (2.4 m). The walls are plaster on lath, with sheetrock used to restore damaged areas.

Interior trim is fir, and includes classical door and window casings with entablature hoods, picture railings and baseboard moldings. The front parlor, which is lighted by the circular bay of the corner tower, is separated from the rear dining room by square Doric pillars resting on a solid rail. The drawing room features paneled wainscoting with a plate rail, box beam ceiling, built-in window seat, and built-in hutch with glazed cabinets. A fir staircase leads from the central hall to the upstairs. The staircase features a square newel post and balusters and paneled wainscoting along the wall. The upstairs bedrooms are organized around a central hall, and feature door surrounds with hoods, picture rails, and other trim. The upstairs includes the small nurses' operating room and adjacent assistant's room with built-in medicine and supply cabinet. Throughout the house the original fir floors have been replaced with oak. The interior rehabilitation included replacing rotting bathroom floors, patching plaster walls and ceilings, installing sheetrock on some extensively damaged walls, and sanding, staining, and varnishing the fir trim.

== Architectural Significance ==
The Blomeen House is an example of vernacular post-Victorian architecture. It owner-builder successfully combined the Craftsman influence of the period with elements of the earlier picturesque mode. The house is characterized by its unusual combination of Craftsman features (broad gable roofs with overhanging eaves, brackets, ornate knee braces, and straightforward clapboard and shingle cladding) with late Queen Anne features (a large corner tower with conical roof, wide veranda with spindle railing and Tuscan columns. In its combination of vernacular designs, the house is unique among architectural resources in Auburn.

== Gallery ==
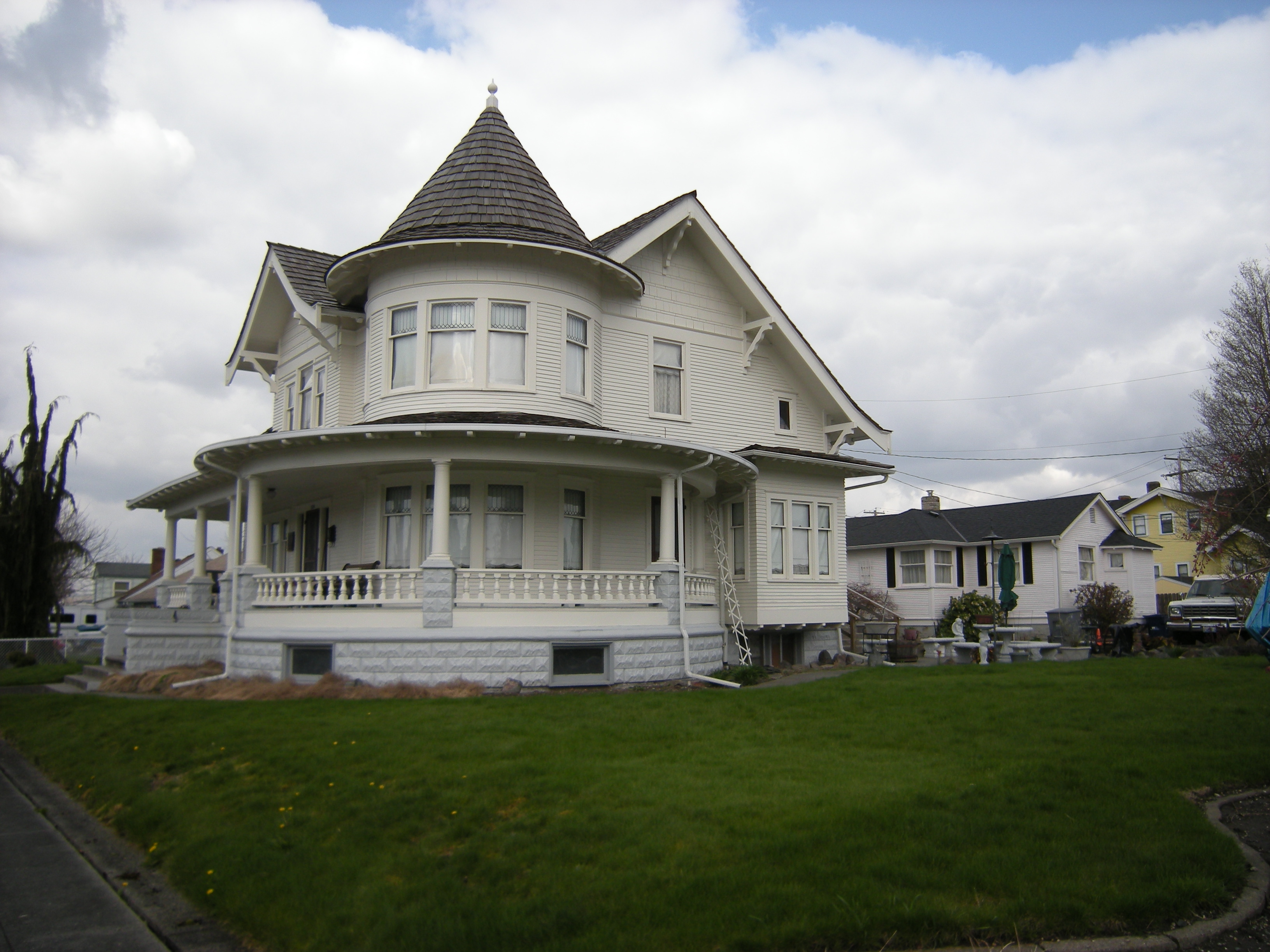

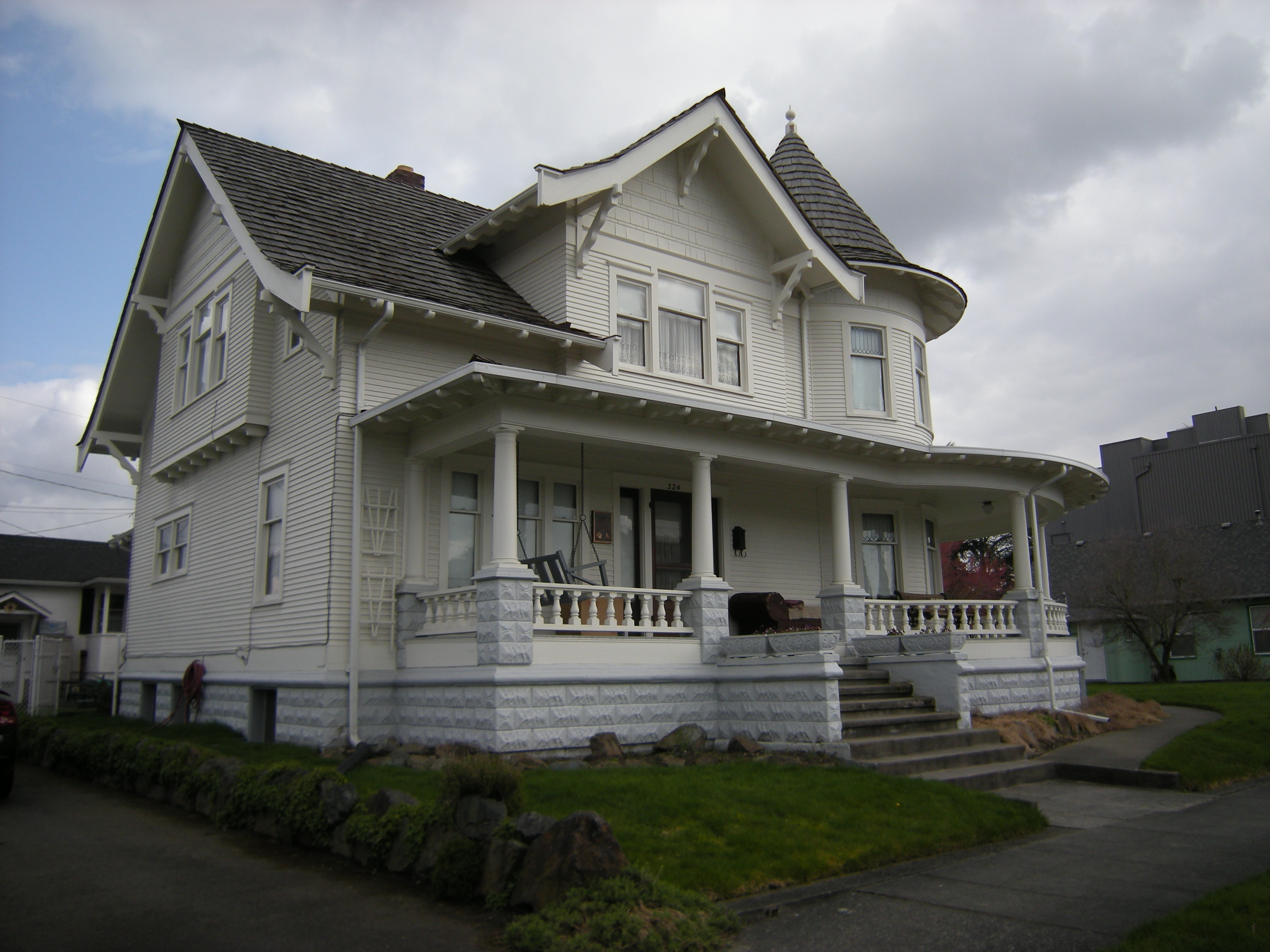

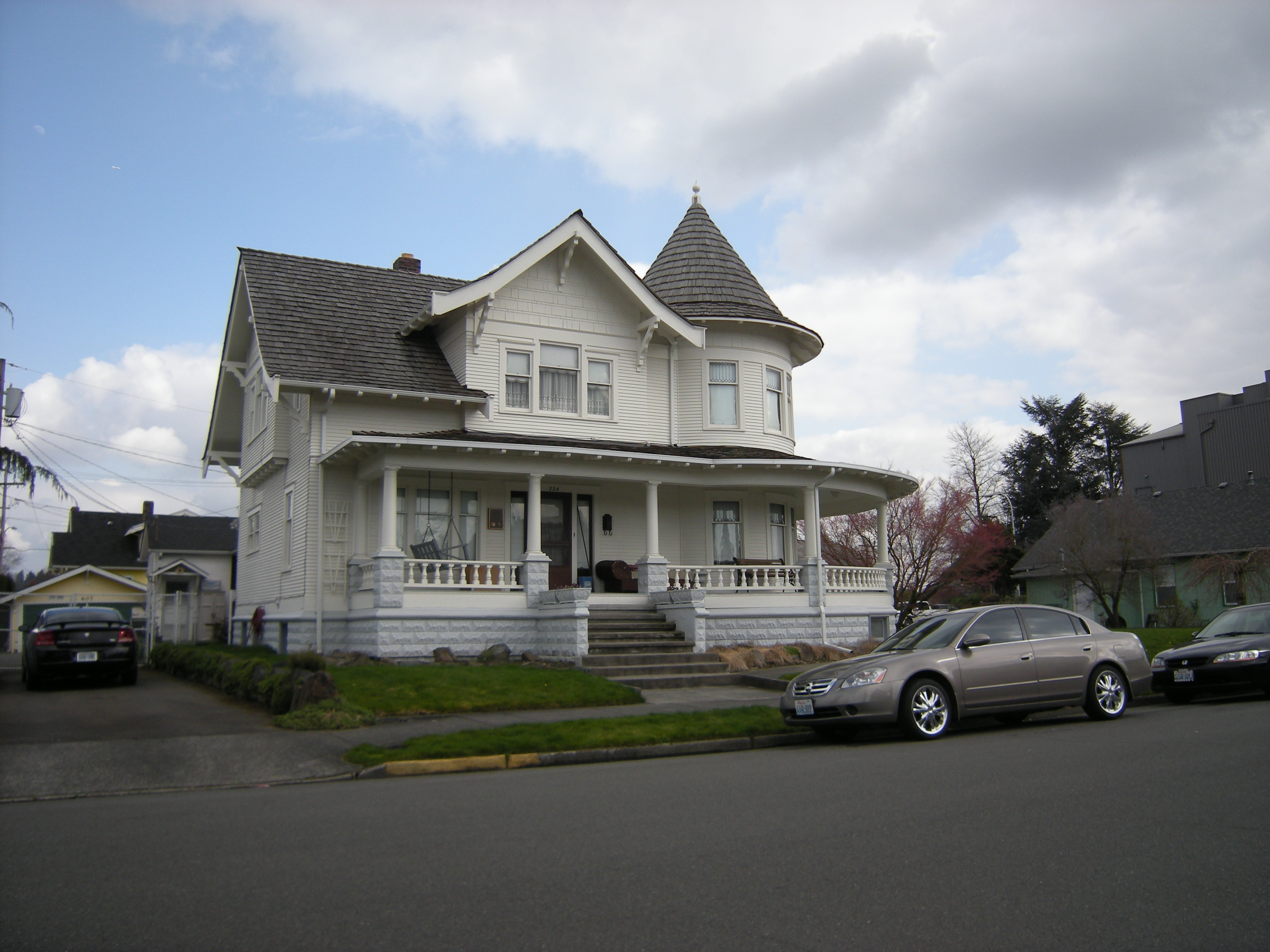

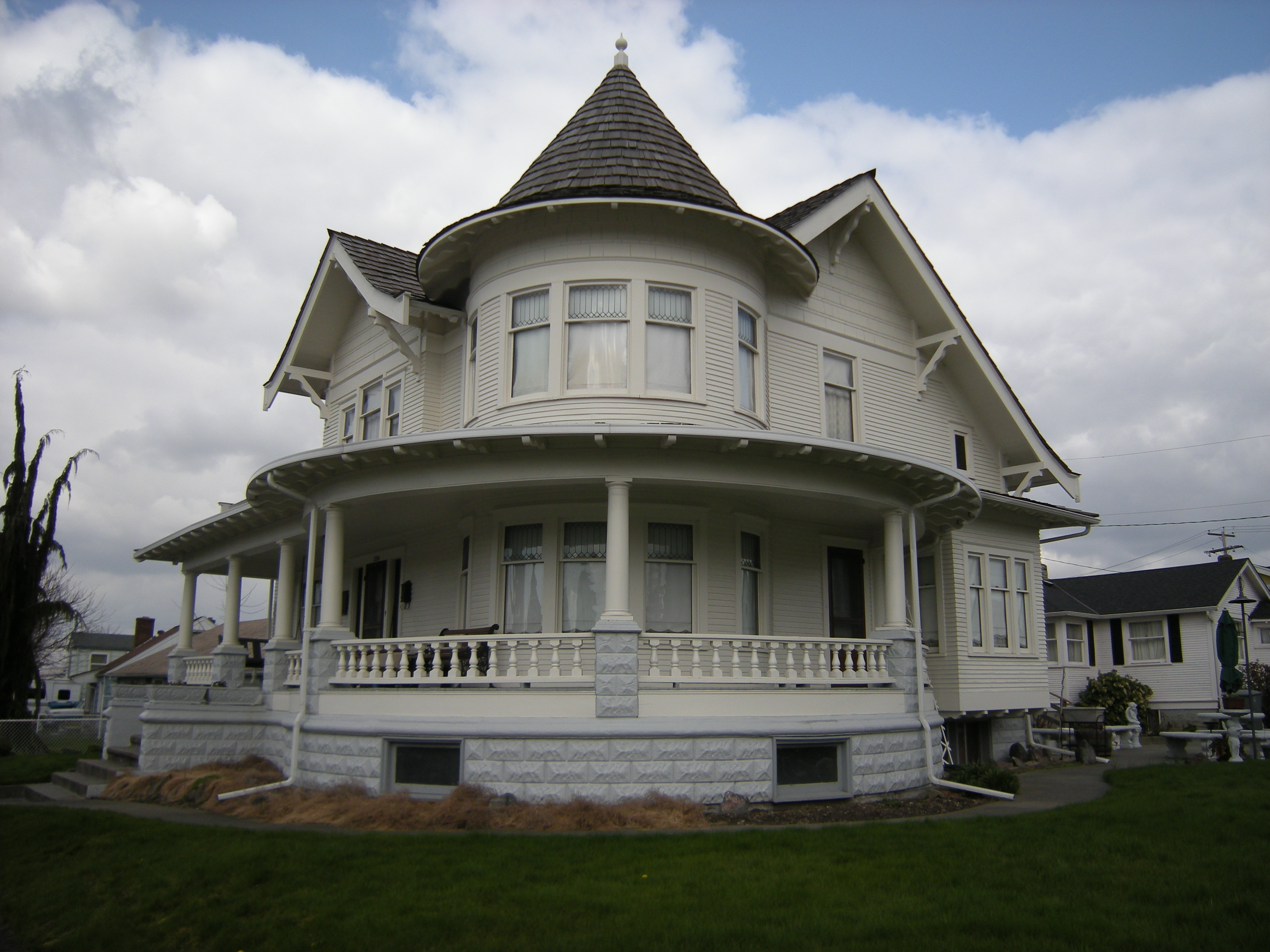

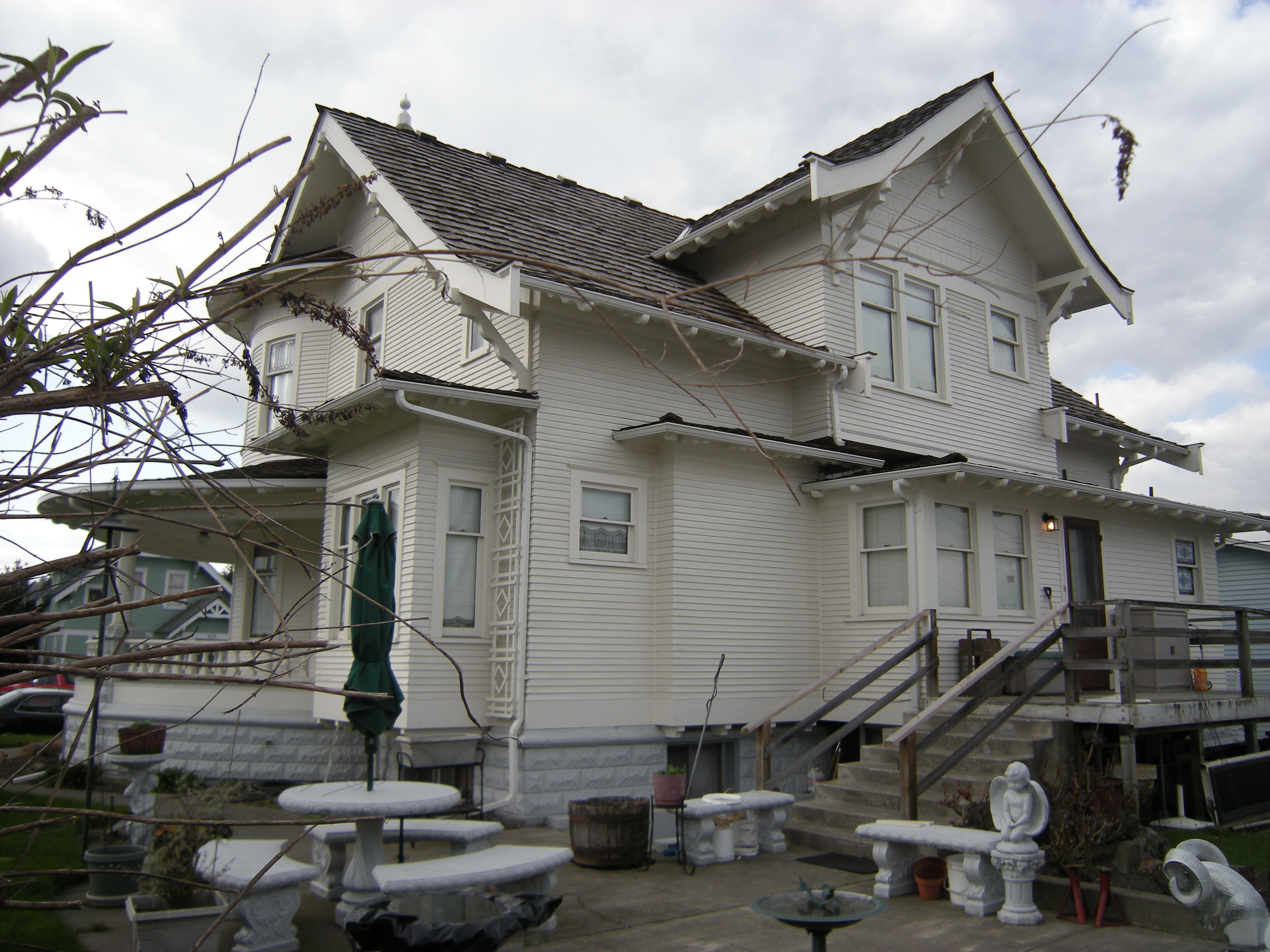

== Bibliographical ==
- Vine, Josephine Emmons Auburn: A Look Down Main Street (Auburn Centennial Commission: Auburn, 1990, p. 69)
- Blomeen House (Auburn Community, October 9, 1990)
- Rommel, Bruce From Private Home to Auburn Landmark (Valley Daily News, January 3, 1991, p. 1)
