= Anderson Park (Redmond, Washington) =

- U.S. National Register of Historic Places
- U.S. Historic district
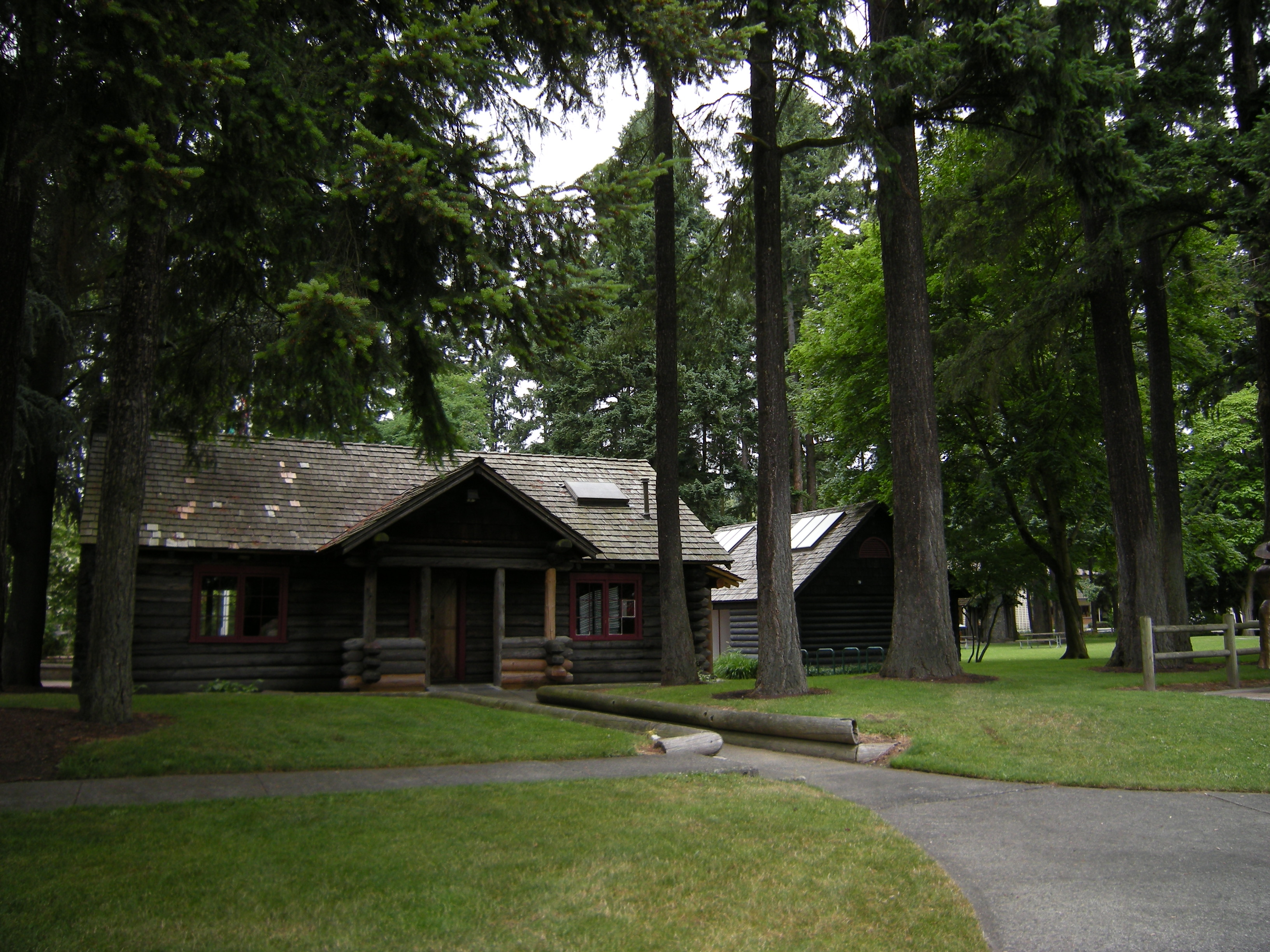

- Location within Washington (state)
- Location: 7802 168th Ave NE, Redmond, Washington
- Coordinates: 47.673°N 122.1157°W
- Area: 5 acres (2.0 ha)
- Built: 1938
- Built by: Works Progress Administration
- Architectural style: National Park Rustic
- NRHP reference No.: 08001302
- Added to NRHP: January 6, 2009

Anderson Park is a public park in the city of Redmond, Washington. The site was acquired in 1928 as Redmond City Park before being expanded and improved through the economic response of the Federal Works Progress Administration in 1938. The park was given its present name in 1946, and is listed on the National Register of Historic Places.

The official name of the park is Albert Anderson Memorial Park; it is still sometimes referred to by the original name of Redmond City Park. Albert Anderson was key to the modern redevelopment of the park through his community work regarding park projects and volunteer coordination. Two cabins are within the park; they were formerly used for public events and services, hosted the Redmond Senior Center, and housed various other city administrative offices prior to the development of city hall.

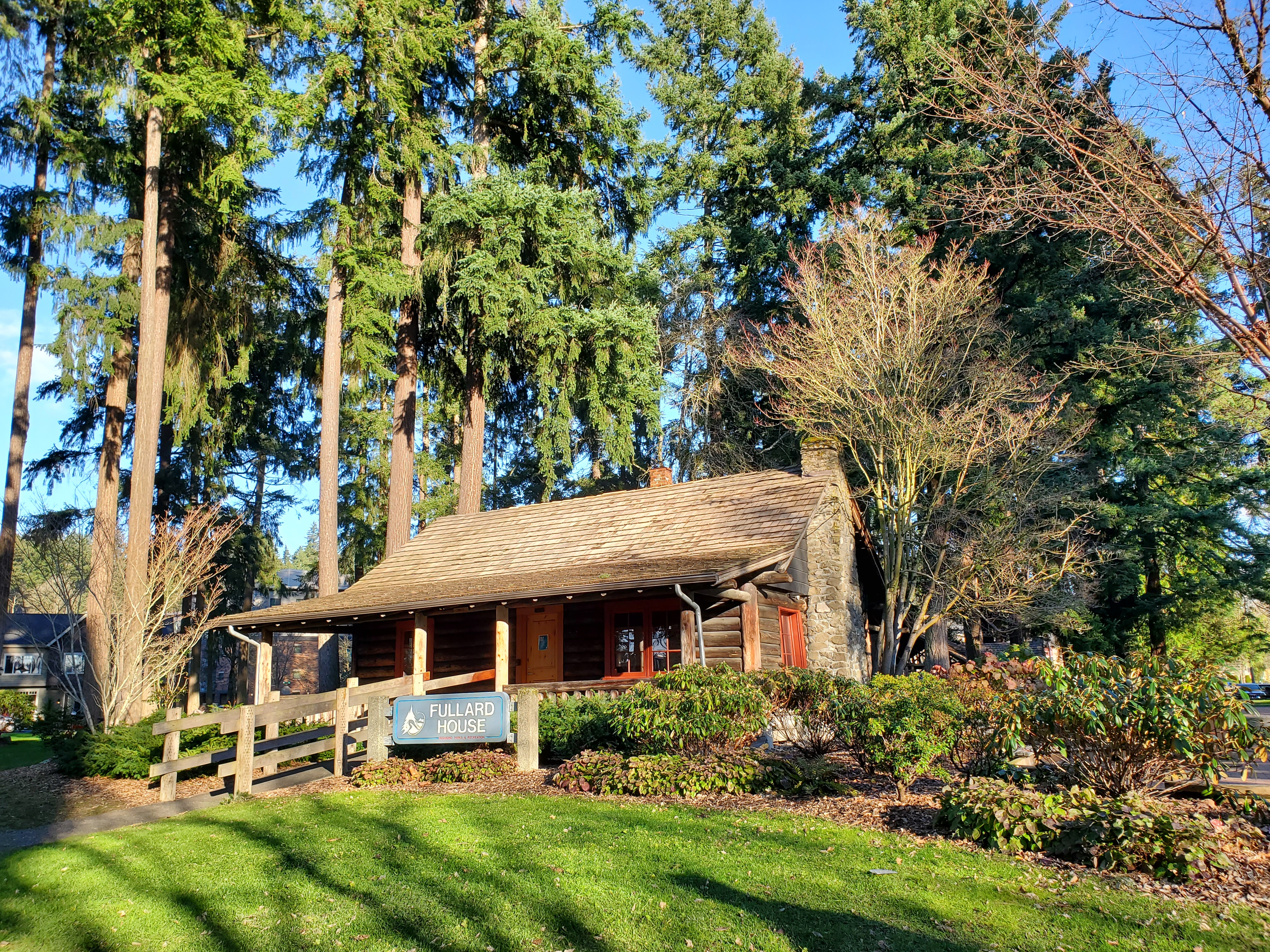
The Fullard House

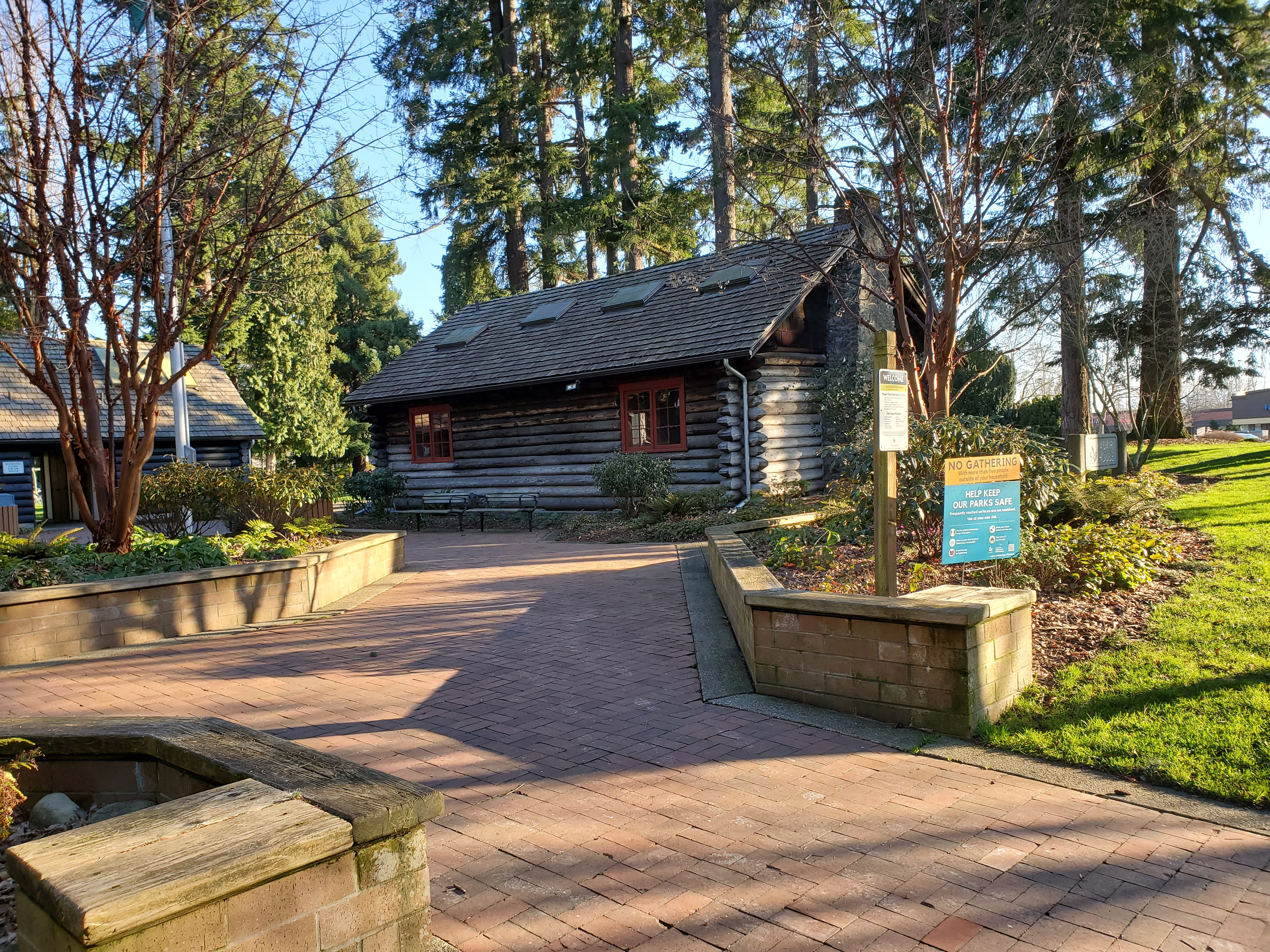
The Adair Housea

== See also ==
- National Register of Historic Places listings in King County, Washington
