= Andrew and Bergette Hjertoos Farm =

- Hjertoos, Andrew and Bergette, Farm
- U.S. National Register of Historic Places
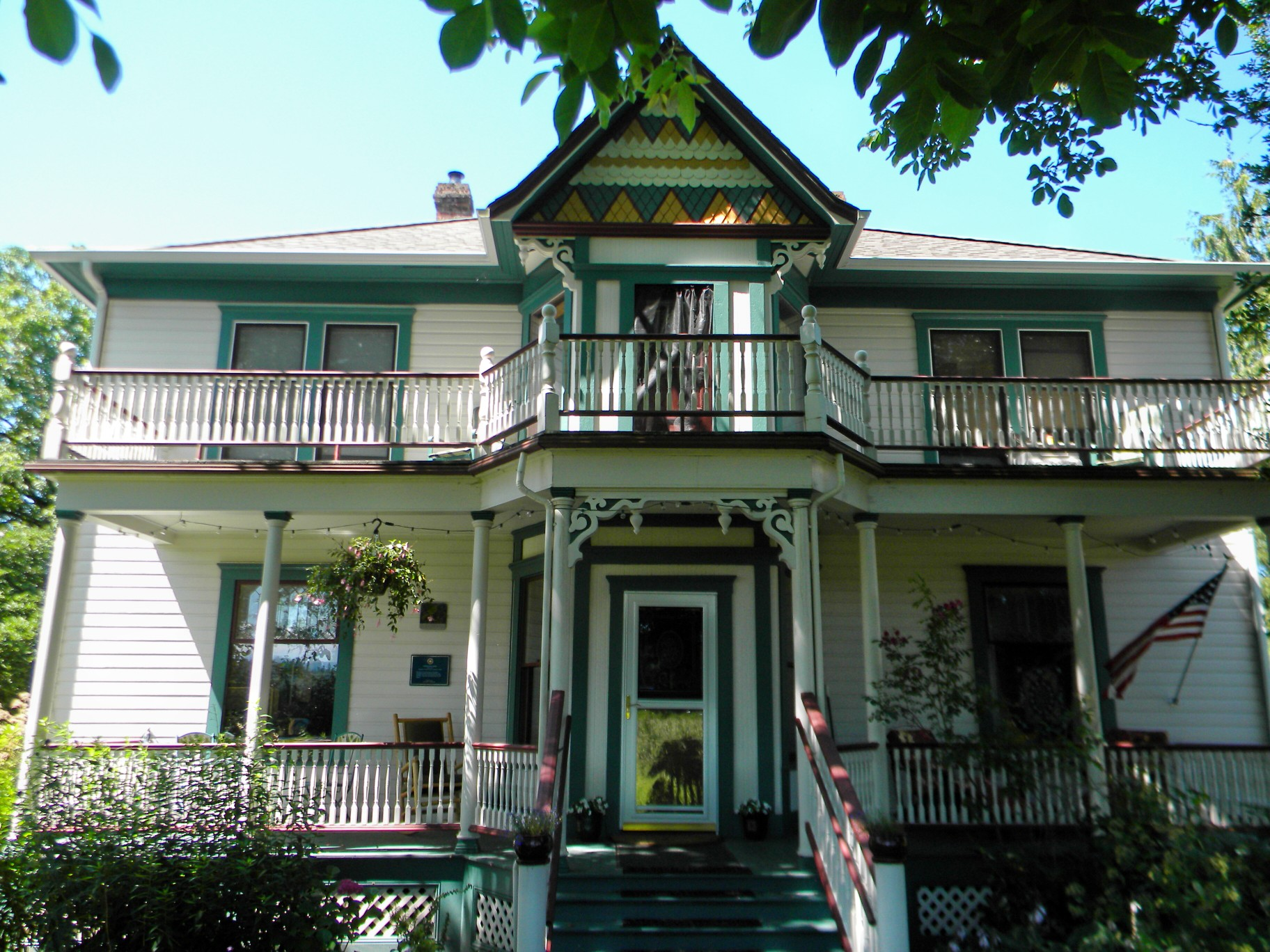
- Hjertoos Farm

- Location within Washington (state) Location within the United States
- Location: 31523 NE 40th, Carnation, Washington
- Coordinates: 47°38′36″N 121°55′04″W
- Area: 24 acres (9.7 ha)
- Built: 1901
- Built by: Hansen, Oscar
- Architectural style: Queen Anne
- MPS: Dairy Farm Properties of Snoqualmie River Valley, Washington MPS
- NRHP reference No.: 02000248
- Added to NRHP: March 22, 2002

The Andrew and Bergette Hjertoos Farm, also known as the Hjertoos Farm and Carnation Tree Farm, is a working farm in Carnation, Washington. Built in 1907 and listed in the National Register of Historic Places in 2002, the farm is an example of early 20th century family dairy farming in the Snoqualmie River Valley.

== History ==
For nearly a hundred years, Hjertoos Farm was associated with the Hjertoos family, Norwegian immigrants who settled in the valley in the 1890s. They established their farm at the confluence of the Tolt River and Snoqualmie River.

The farm consists of a well-preserved 1907 farmhouse, a large dairy barn built in 1910, a milkhouse, and 24 acres of agricultural land. The farmhouse is a two-story wood frame structure with a hipped roof and hipped roof dormers, and a hipped roof porch in the rear which has been enclosed. The original two-story front porch was removed in the 1950s, then recreated from old family photographs in 1980s.

The dairy barn, unusually large for its time at 40' by 94', was a modern showpiece when built in 1910 with a concrete foundation and flooring, and a full hayloft with an unusual system of distinctive diagonal roof braces. Dimensional lumber, new at the time, was used in its construction. The farm was originally 208 acres; sections of land were sold or donated for the use of Tolt High School, the IOOF Hall, and Tolt River Park.

== Recent changes ==
The farm was operated as a dairy farm until 1954. In 1978, the owner (great-grandson of Andrew and Bergette Hjertoos) planted a tree farm. As Carnation Tree Farm, the property has 16 acres of Douglas fir, Fraser fir, Grand fir, Noble fir, Nordmann fir, Norway, and blue spruce trees which customers can cut themselves.

In 2018, the Tolt-Carnation Historical Museum was moved from the nearby Carnation Farm to a permanent location in the Hjertoos farmhouse.
