= Vincent School =

- U.S. National Register of Historic Places
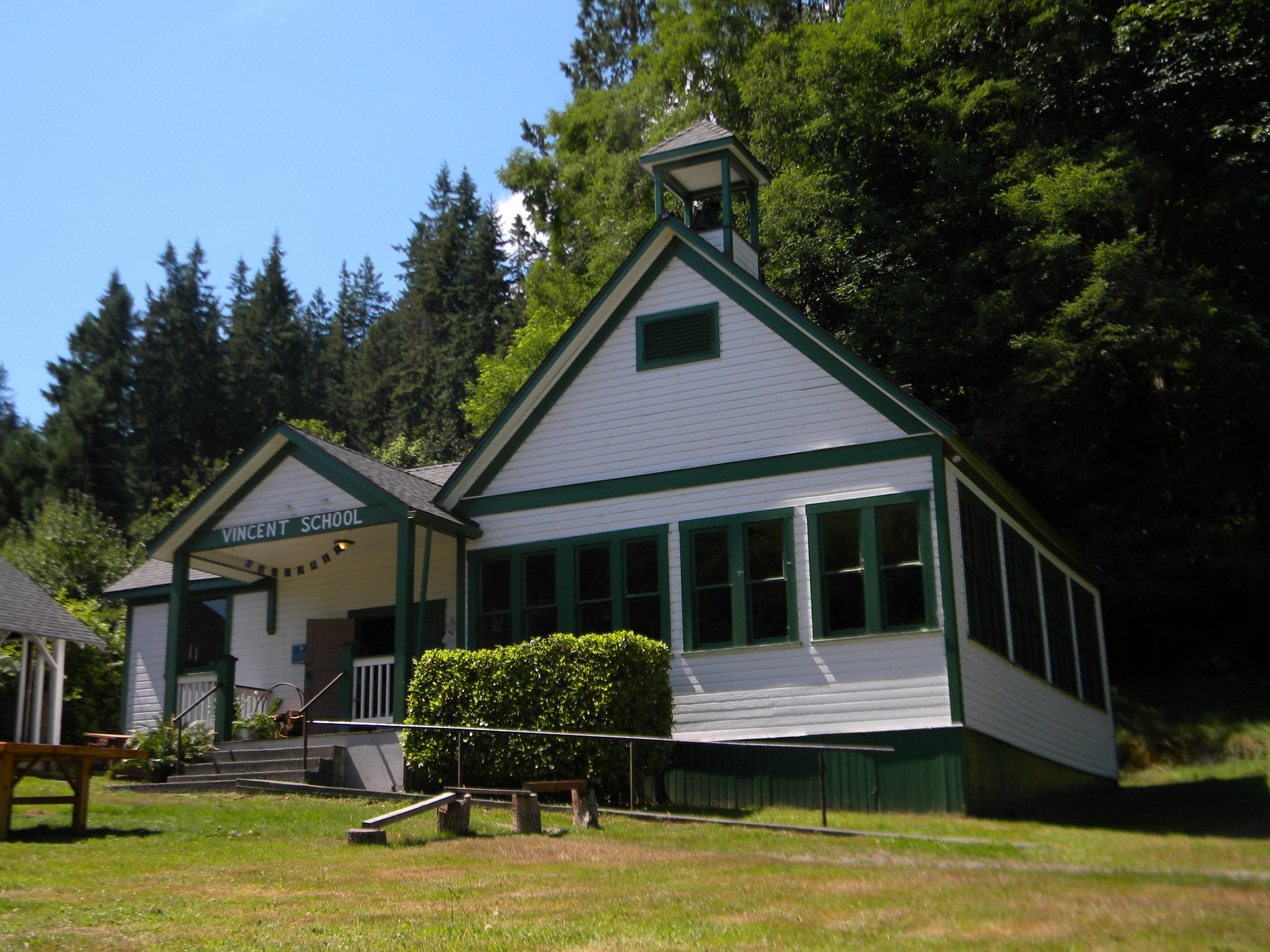
- Vincent School

- Location within Washington (state) Location within the United States
- Location: 8010 West Snoqualmie Valley Road, Carnation, Washington
- Coordinates: 47°40′26″N 121°58′42″W
- Built: 1905
- NRHP reference No.: 04000920
- Added to NRHP: August 25, 2004

The Vincent School, also known as Vincent Schoolhouse, was an early twentieth century schoolhouse in the rural community of Vincent, near Carnation, Washington, USA. Construction of the school began in 1905 and it was added to the National Register of Historic Places in 2004. The building is currently used as a community center.

== History ==
The Vincent School is a one-story wood-frame structure. Originally 864 square feet (80.3 m^{2}), a 576 square feet (53.5 m^{2}) annex was added in 1919, which provided additional instructional space and room for the teacher to live. The original building is capped with a high-pitched front gable roof and a small bell tower. The bell tower was removed between 1932 and 1936, and then restored with the original bell in 1988. Initially, the schoolhouse was heated by wood-burning stove; later, an interior fireplace replaced it. In the 1930s, a Works Progress Administration project built a small outbuilding to provide lavatories for the children.

The schoolhouse was built by the community in 1905, a one-room schoolhouse that served all grade levels. Teachers were generally hired for 2–3 months at a time during seasons when children could be released from farm responsibilities. Between 1914 and 1919, an average of 22 pupils attended the school.

The school closed in 1942, and has been used by the Vincent Community Club since. The Vincent School was the primary public building in Carnation for approximately 98 years.
