= List of landmarks in King County, Washington =

King County, Washington, like many other jurisdictions, maintains a list of landmarks, as do several cities within the county. This is a list of landmarks designated by the county.

Landmark	Built	Listed	Address	City or town	Photo
Archaeological Site 45-KI-22		1993	location confidential		Upload image
Baring Bridge	1930	1999	NE Index Creek Road	Baring vicinity	
Burton Masonic Hall	1894	1995	23927 Vashon Highway SW	Vashon Island	
Camp North Bend (Camp Waskowitz)	1935	1992	45509 SE 150th Street	North Bend	
Clise Residence (James & Anna)/Willowmoor Farm	1904–1920	1982	Marymoor Park, 6046 Lake Sammamish Parkway	Redmond vicinity	
Colvos Store	1923	1987	123rd Ave. SW and Cove Road	Vashon Island	Upload image
Des Moines Activity Center	1938–40	1984	1000 220th Street	Des Moines	
Dockton Store and Post Office	1908	1992	25908 99th Avenue SW	Vashon Island	
Dougherty Farmstead	1888	1983	26526 NE Cherry Valley Road	Duvall vicinity	
Elliott Farm	1911	1990	14207 Maple Valley Highway	Renton vicinity	Upload image
Enumclaw Activity Center	1938–40	1984	SE 448th Street and 204th Avenue SE	Enumclaw vicinity	Upload image
Fall City Hop Shed	1880	1982	Fall City River Front Park	Fall City	
Fall City Masonic Hall	1895	1994	33700 SE 43rd Street	Fall City	
Foss River Bridge	1951	2004	Foss River Road	Skykomish vicinity	
Fourteenth Avenue South Bridge (South Park Bridge) (demolished 2010–2011)	1930	1996	Over Duwamish River	Near South Park, Seattle	
Green River Gorge Bridge	1915	2004	Green River Gorge Road	Black Diamond vicinity	Upload image
Harrington-Beall Greenhouse Company Historic District	c. 1885–1886	1988–1994	18527-31 Beall Road	Vashon Island	Upload image
Hjertoos Farm	1907–1910	1986	31523 NE 40th	Carnation vicinity	Upload image
Issaquah Sportsmen's Club	1937	1997	23600 SE Evans Street	Issaquah	
Judd Creek Bridge	1953	2004	Vashon Highway	Burton vicinity	
King County Courthouse	1916, 1931	1987	Third & James	Seattle	
Lagesson Homestead	1880s	1986	20201 SE 216th Street	Maple Valley	Upload image
Lake Wilderness Lodge	1950	1997	22500 SE 248th	Maple Valley	
August Lovegren House	1904	1994	8612 310th Avenue SE	Preston	
Luther Burbank School	1928	1984	2040 84th Avenue SE	Mercer Island	
Maple Valley School	1910	1994	23015 SE 216th	Maple Valley	
Marjesira Inn	1906	1994	25134 Vashon Highway SW	Vashon Island, Washington	Upload image
Thomas McNair House	1884	1993	22915 107th Avenue SW	Vashon Island, Washington	
Meadowbrook Bridge	1921	1997	Meadowbrook Avenue	Snoqualmie	Upload image
Miller River Bridge	1922		Old Cascade Scenic Highway	Skykomish vicinity	Upload image
Mount Si Bridge	1904/1955	1997	Mt. Si Road	North Bend	Upload image
Mukai Agricultural Complex	1926	1993	18005-18017 107th Avenue SW	Vashon Island, Washington	
Neely (Aaron) Mansion	1894	1982	12303 Auburn-Black Diamond Road	Auburn	
Neely (Aaron) Mansion Hori Furo (Hori Bathhouse-Japanese)	1930	1996	12303 Auburn-Black Diamond Road	Auburn	Upload image
Neighbor-Bennett House	1904	1996	4317 337th Place SE	Fall City	
Norman Bridge (demolished)	1950	1984	Middle Fork of Snoqualmie River, 428th Avenue SE	North Bend vicinity	Upload image
Gunnar T. Olson House	1912	1985	20015 NE 50th	Redmond vicinity (Happy Valley)	Upload image
Matilde & Olof Olson Farm	1907–09	1991	24206 SE 216th Street	Maple Valley	
Pacific Coast Coal Company Offices	c. 1927	1993	18825 SE Maple Valley Highway	Maple Valley	Upload image
Patton Bridge	1950	2004	Upper Green River Road	Auburn vicinity	Upload image
Captain Thomas W. Phillips House	1925	1992	11312 SW 232nd Street	Vashon Island	Upload image
Platt Dairy Farm		2007	NE 138th Street	Duvall	Upload image
Prescott-Harshman House	1904	1984	33429 Redmond-Fall City Road	Fall City	
Preston Activity Center	1938–40	1984	8625 310th Avenue SE	Preston	
Quaale Log House	1907	1990	10101 W. Snoqualmie Valley Road NE	Carnation vicinity	Upload image
Raging River Bridge	1915	1997	SE 68th Street	Fall City	
Red Brick Road / James Mattson Road	1901	1993	196th Ave. NE between Union Hill Road & 55th Place NE	Redmond vicinity	
Reinig Road Sycamore Corridor	1929	1982	Between 396th Drive SE & SE 79th Street	Snoqualmie vicinity	Upload image
Reynolds Farm & Indian Agency	c. 1870	1985	16816 SE 384th	Auburn vicinity	Upload image
Sanders Mansion (Eric Gustav)	1912	1985	5516 S. 277th Street	Auburn vicinity	Upload image
Schwartz-Bell House	1930	1996	20233 81st Avenue S	Vashon Island	Upload image
Town of Selleck	1908–39	1987	E. of Maple Valley, N. of Enumclaw	Selleck	
Smith-Baldwin House (Fern Cove)	1912	1995	Cedarhurst Road	Vashon Island	Upload image
Hilmar & Selma Steen House	1910	1996	10924 SW Cove Road	Vashon Island	Upload image
Si View Pool and Activity Center	1938–40	1984	Orchard Drive	North Bend	
Snoqualmie Falls Lumber Co. Power Plant	1917–1929	2005	SE Mill Pond Road		Upload image
Stossel Bridge	1951	1997	NE Carnation Farm Road		Upload image
Sutherland's Grocery & Filling Station	1931/1934	2002	34051 Military Road South		
Tahoma High School	1926/1938	2001	24415 SE 216th Way	Maple Valley	
Tolt Bridge (demolished 2008)	1922	1997	NE Tolt Hill Road (NE 32nd Street)		Upload image
Vashon Odd Fellows Hall	1912	1985	19704 Vashon Highway SW	Vashon Island	
Vashon Hardware Store	1890, 1935	1986	17601 Vashon Highway SW	Vashon Island	
Vincent Schoolhouse	1905	1986	8001 W Snoqualmie Valley Road NE	Carnation vicinity	Upload image
White Center Fieldhouse	1938–40	1984	1321 SW 102nd Street	White Center	

In addition, the following have the status of King County Community Landmarks:

Landmark	Built	Listed	Address	City or town	Photo
Fall City Historic Residential District	1887–1942	2002	vicinity of Preston-Fall City Road	Fall City	
Norman Edson Studio	1890s	1985	23825 Vashon Hwy SW	Vashon Island	
Hillgrove Cemetery	1923	1984	200th St. between 15th & 16th St.	Highline	Upload image

== See also ==
- National Register of Historic Places listings in King County, Washington
- List of landmarks in Seattle
- Auburn, Washington#City landmarks
- Black Diamond, Washington#City landmarks
- Carnation, Washington#City landmarks
- Des Moines, Washington#City landmarks
- Kenmore, Washington#Neighborhoods mentions the city landmark Charles and Elvera Thomsen House.
- Kent, Washington#City landmarks
- Kirkland, Washington#City landmarks
- Newcastle, Washington#City landmarks
- North Bend, Washington#Landmarks
- Redmond, Washington#City landmark
- Shoreline, Washington#City landmarks
- Snoqualmie, Washington#City landmarks
- Woodinville, Washington#City landmarks
