= List of traditional gentlemen's and working men's club buildings =

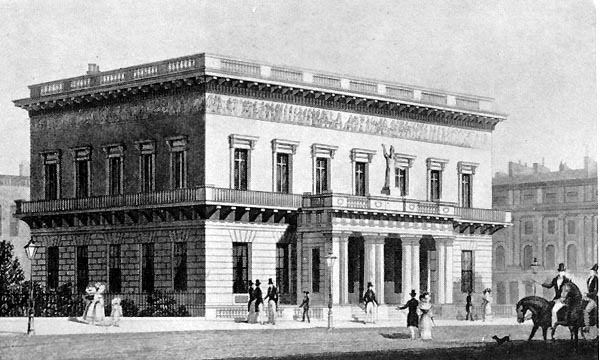
The Athenaeum Club building at 107 Pall Mall, London, in 1830

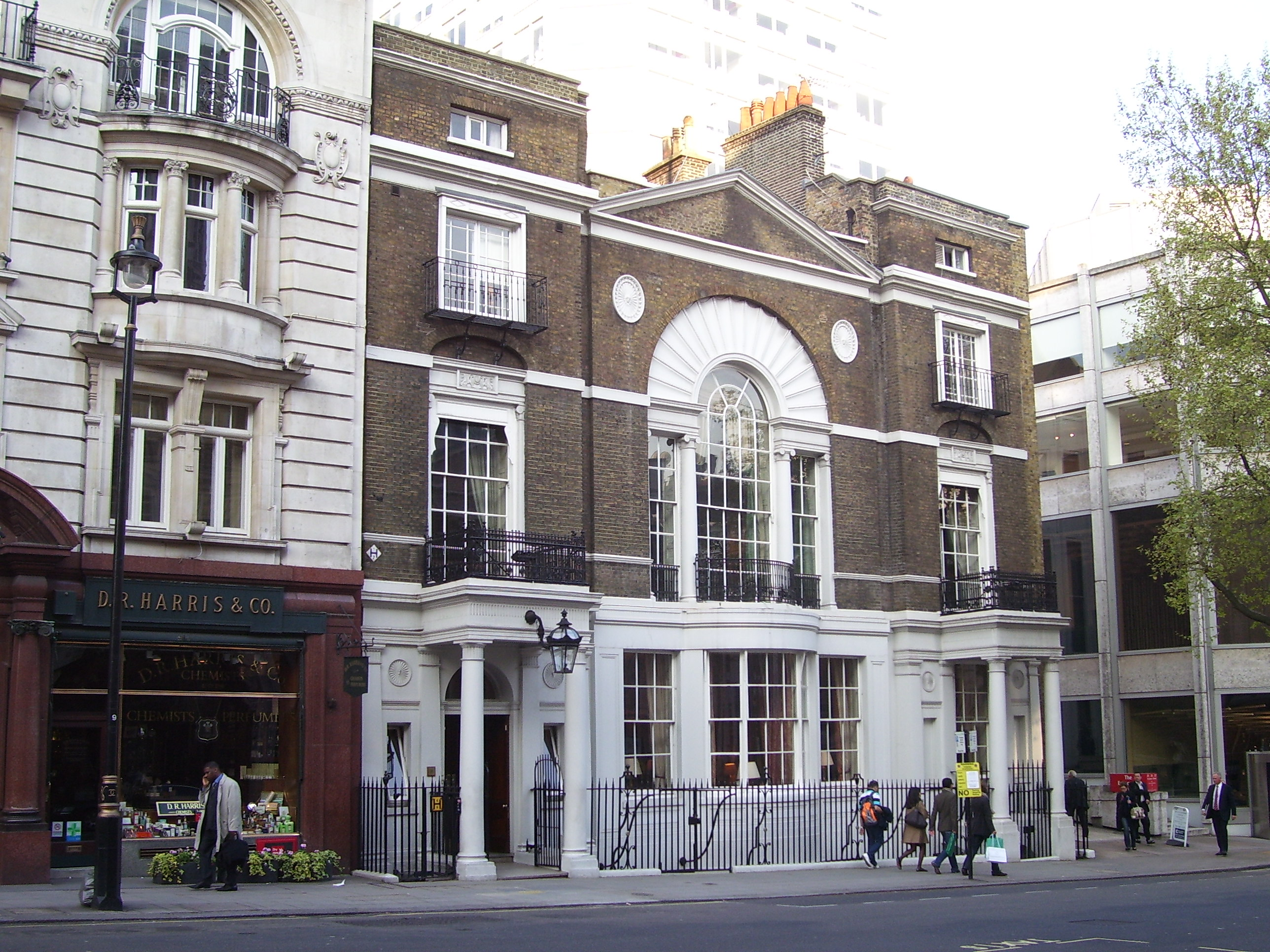
Boodle's building since 1782

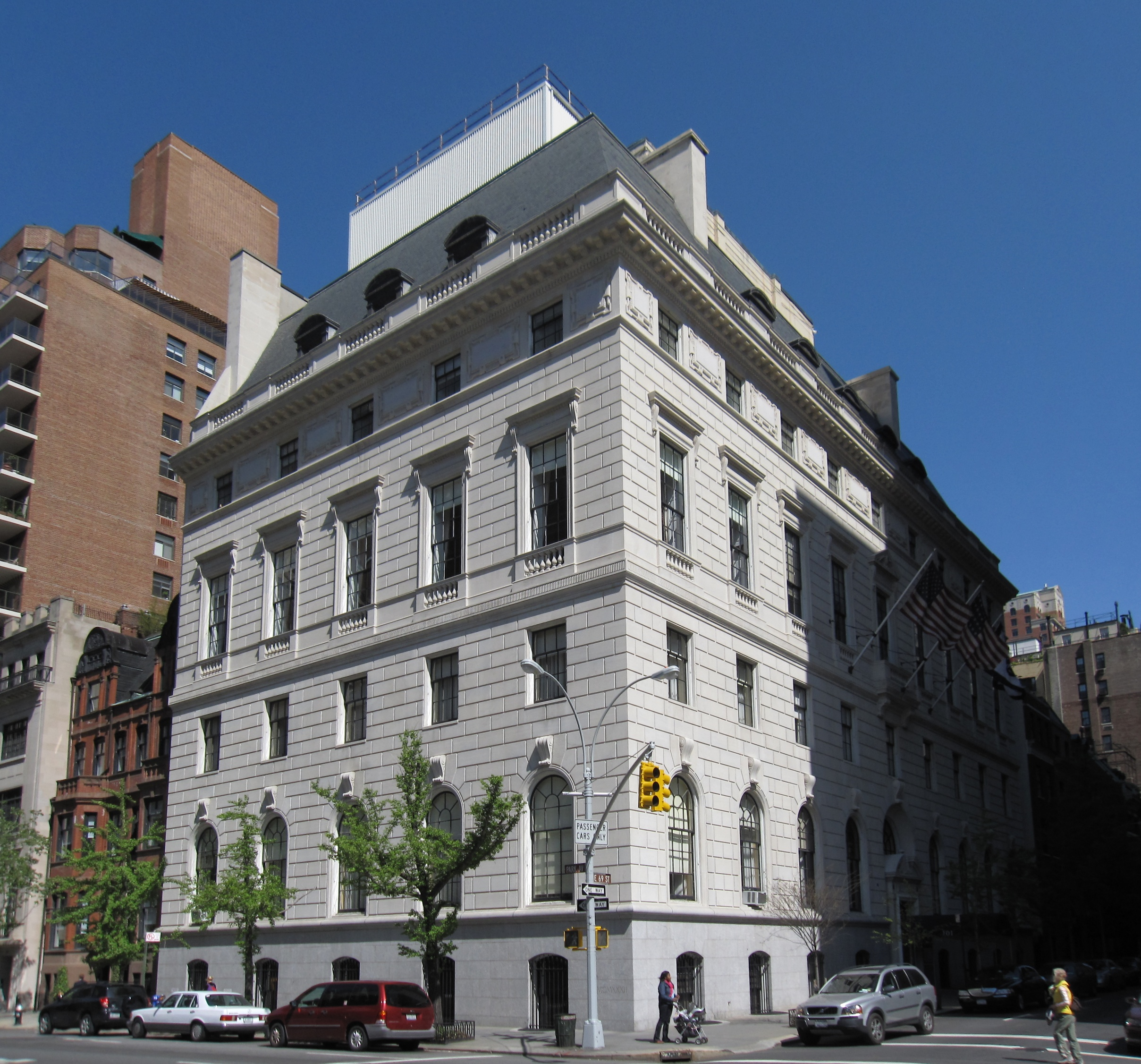
Union Club of the City of New York's 1903 building

This is a list of notable buildings that have housed traditional gentlemen's clubs or working men's clubs. These are individual buildings that are listed on a historic register or have other significance. The focus of this list is on buildings, not on the clubs themselves.

in England

- Of 25 gentlemen's clubs in London, many are ensconced in historic, dedicated buildings, including:
  - Boodle's building at 28 St. James's Street, its home since 1782
  - Athenaeum Club building at 107 Pall Mall since 1830 or before
- Houldsworth Working Men's Club, Manchester, a Grade II listed building
- Dial House, Sheffield, location of former Dial House Working Men's Club

in the United States

Many traditional gentlemen's clubs in the United States are situated in notable historic buildings, a number of which are listed on the National Register of Historic Places.

- Tallulah Men's Club Building, Tallulah, LA, NRHP-listed
- West End Wheelmen's Club, Wilkes-Barre, PA, built 1897, NRHP-listed. Shingle Style, with a wraparound porch and porte cochere, built in .
- Issaquah Sportsmen's Club, Issaquah, WA, NRHP-listed
- Cincinnati Gymnasium and Athletic Club, Cincinnati, Ohio, NRHP-listed
- Denver Athletic Club, Denver, CO, NRHP-listed
- Elks Athletic Club, Louisville KY, NRHP-listed
- Midwest Athletic Club, Chicago, IL, NRHP-listed
- Missouri Athletic Club Building, St. Louis, MO, NRHP-listed
- Union Pacific Athletic Club, Laramie, WY, NRHP-listed
- Southside Sportsmens Club District, Great River, NY, NRHP-listed

Non NRHP Buildings

- The Boston Club, New Orleans, LA, built by noted architect James Gallier

== See also ==
- List of Elks buildings
- List of Masonic buildings
- List of Fraternal Order of Eagles buildings
- List of YMCA buildings
- List of Grange Hall buildings
- List of Hibernian buildings
- List of Knights of Columbus buildings
- List of Knights of Pythias buildings
- List of Odd Fellows buildings
- List of women's club buildings
