= Crosby Lake =

Lake in Washington state, US

- Location within Washington (state) Location within the United States
- Location: King County, Washington, United States
- Coordinates: 47.72264°N 121.497083°W
- Basin countries: United States
- Surface area: 1.4 acres (0.57 ha)
- Surface elevation: 4,511 ft (1,375 m)

Crosby Lake is an alpine freshwater lake located on a plateau at the northern skirt of Crosby Mountain, a short distance south of Red Mountain and Palmer Mountain in King County, Washington. Boner Lake is at the opposite side of the Crosby Mountain ridge. Crosby Lake is a small 1.4 acres (0.57 ha) lake and it is stocked with golden trout.

== Location ==
Crosby Lake is approximately 5 miles (8.0 km) south of the community of Baring and west of Grotto along U.S. Route 2. The summit of Crosby Mountain is approximately 1/4 mile south. Crosby Lake is less than a mile from Boner Lake, which sits in a plateau that is used as the trail to Crosby Mountain from the south approach. Cement Lake is a mile east from Crosby Lake.

== See also ==
- List of lakes of the Alpine Lakes Wilderness
