= Boner Lake =

Lake in Washingtion state, U.S.

- Location within Washington (state) Location within the United States
- Location: King County, Washington, United States
- Coordinates: 47.7149°N 121.4852°W
- Basin countries: United States
- Surface area: 2.4 acres (0.97 ha)
- Surface elevation: 4,833 ft (1,473 m)

Boner Lake is an alpine freshwater lake located on a prominent plateau at the eastern ridge of Crosby Mountain, a short distance south of Palmer Mountain and U.S. Route 2 by the community of Baring in King County, Washington. Boner Lake shares the high valley with Cement Lake, while Crosby Lake is at the opposite side of the Corsby Mountain ridge. Boner lake is surrounded by talus cliffs and slopes and gains access to Crosby Mountain starting at Bing Peak and old-growth forests and the associated logging spur.

Boner Lake is a small 2.4 acres (0.97 ha) lake and it is stocked with golden trout.

== See also ==
- List of lakes of the Alpine Lakes Wilderness
