= Mukai Cold Process Fruit Barrelling Plant =

- U.S. National Register of Historic Places
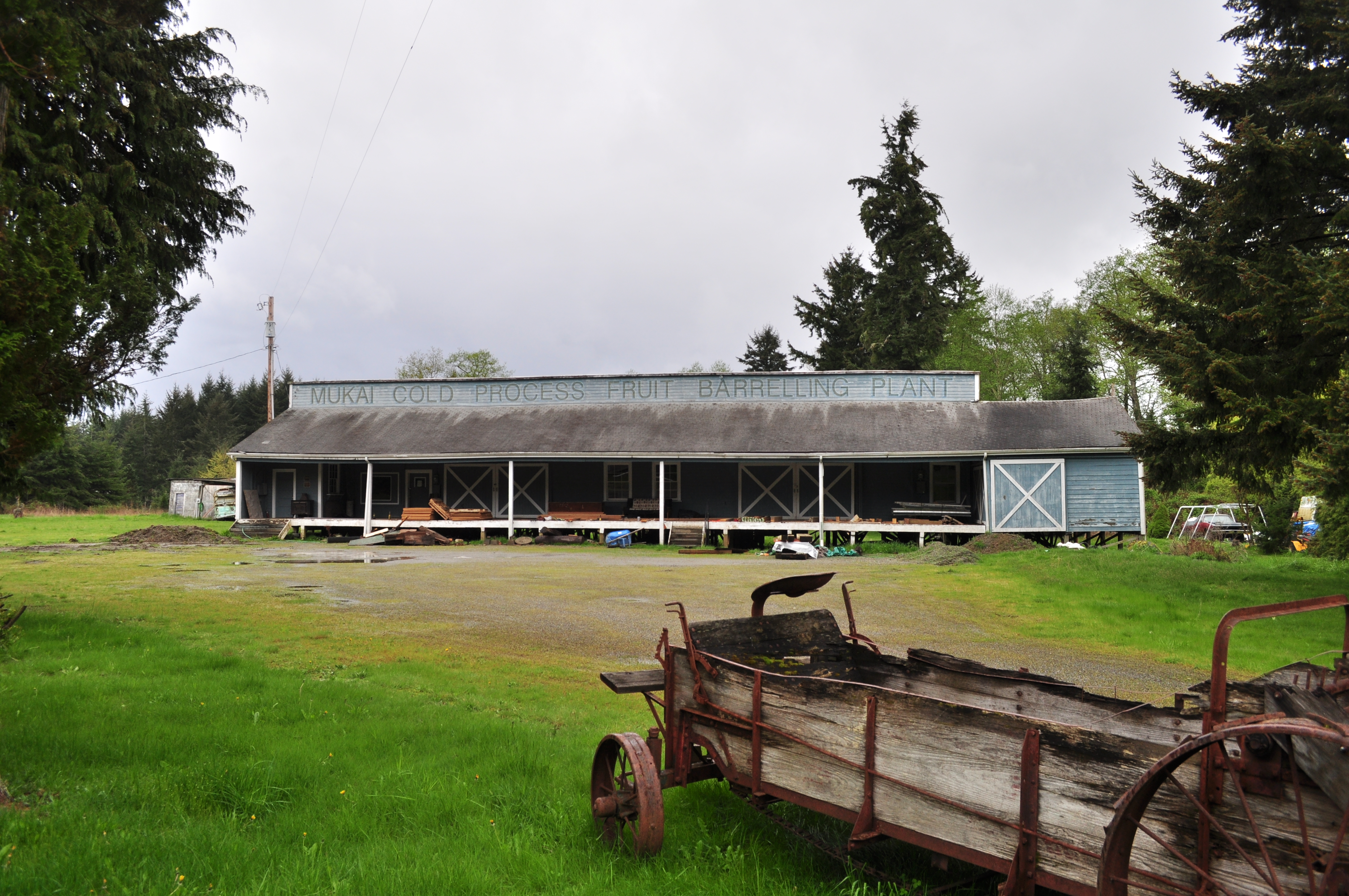
- Mukai Cold Process Fruit Barrelling Plant, built 1926, photographed 2014

- Location within Washington (state)
- Location: 18005, 18017 107th Ave. SW, Vashon, Washington
- Coordinates: 47°26′36″N 122°28′16″W
- Area: 4.8 acres (1.9 ha)
- Built: 1926
- Architect: Denichiro Mukai
- Architectural style: Colonial Revival
- NRHP reference No.: 94001165
- Added to NRHP: September 26, 1994

The Mukai Cold Process Fruit Barrelling [sic] Plant (also known as Mukai and Sons, Vashon Island Packing Company, or VIPCO) in Vashon, Washington, U.S., is a former fruit processing plant originally constructed and owned by the Japanese American Mukai family. In 1993 it became the first location associated with Japanese American history to be designated a King County landmark and was listed the following year on the National Register of Historic Places. The National Park Service (NPS) describes the 4.8-acre (1.9 ha) site as "a rare, intact example of a property associated with the history of Japanese American settlement in Washington."

== History ==
Sources disagree about Barrelling Plant founder Denichiro Mukai's history; one newspaper source says he emigrated from Japan to San Francisco "at age 15 or 16... in about 1885"; a National Park Service (NPS) article says he came "from a farming community near Osaka, Japan, to San Francisco at the age of 15 in the late 19th century; Mary Matthews, who wrote the King County Landmark Nomination for the property, says he was born in 1886 and jumped ship San Francisco in 1902. The NPS says "Sometime after turning 21" he married Sato Nakanishi; Helen Meeker dates their marriage to 1910;. Matthews does not give a marriage date, but says that in 1907–08 Denichiro Mukai, Sato, and Sato's sister Kuni Mukai arrived in Seattle.

Denichiro Mukai's first American employer, a wealthy sheep farmer, eventually sent him to school, where he learned English. His name became shortened to "Ben," then to the nickname "B.D." He worked subsequently in various jobs in San Francisco including as a police interpreter and head of an employment agency. B.D. and Sato Mukai moved north to Seattle after the 1906 San Francisco earthquake. For a time they had a restaurant on Seattle's Fourth Avenue. B.D. later worked for Walter Bowen and Company, on Seattle's Western Avenue "Wholesale Row." There he became familiar with the strawberries grown on nearby Vashon Island; he and his wife—she now suffering from tuberculosis—moved to the island in 1910 to grow strawberries.

There were a number of other Japanese immigrants strawberry farmers on the island at the time, including the Sakai and Hoshi families. B.D. Mukai began as a tenant farmer but, exceptionally, one with enough money to hire other Japanese laborers and pickers. He and his family never had to work the fields themselves. A continual innovator, B.D. Mukai hired his own barge to get his berries to market in Seattle ahead of other growers. Sato Mukai died May 1, 1921, of tuberculosis (in 1915, according to Meeker; in 1922, according to Matthews) and B.D. married her sister Kuni, who had traveled with them to Seattle and worked there as a domestic. In 1924 the Mukais set up their first barreling plant; preserving the berries in this manner allowed him to bypass the Seattle wholesalers and, instead, sell worldwide through large distribution companies such as John Sexton and Company. According to the NPS, this "revolutioniz[ed] the industry"; Mukai could sell directly to makers of preserves and ice cream.

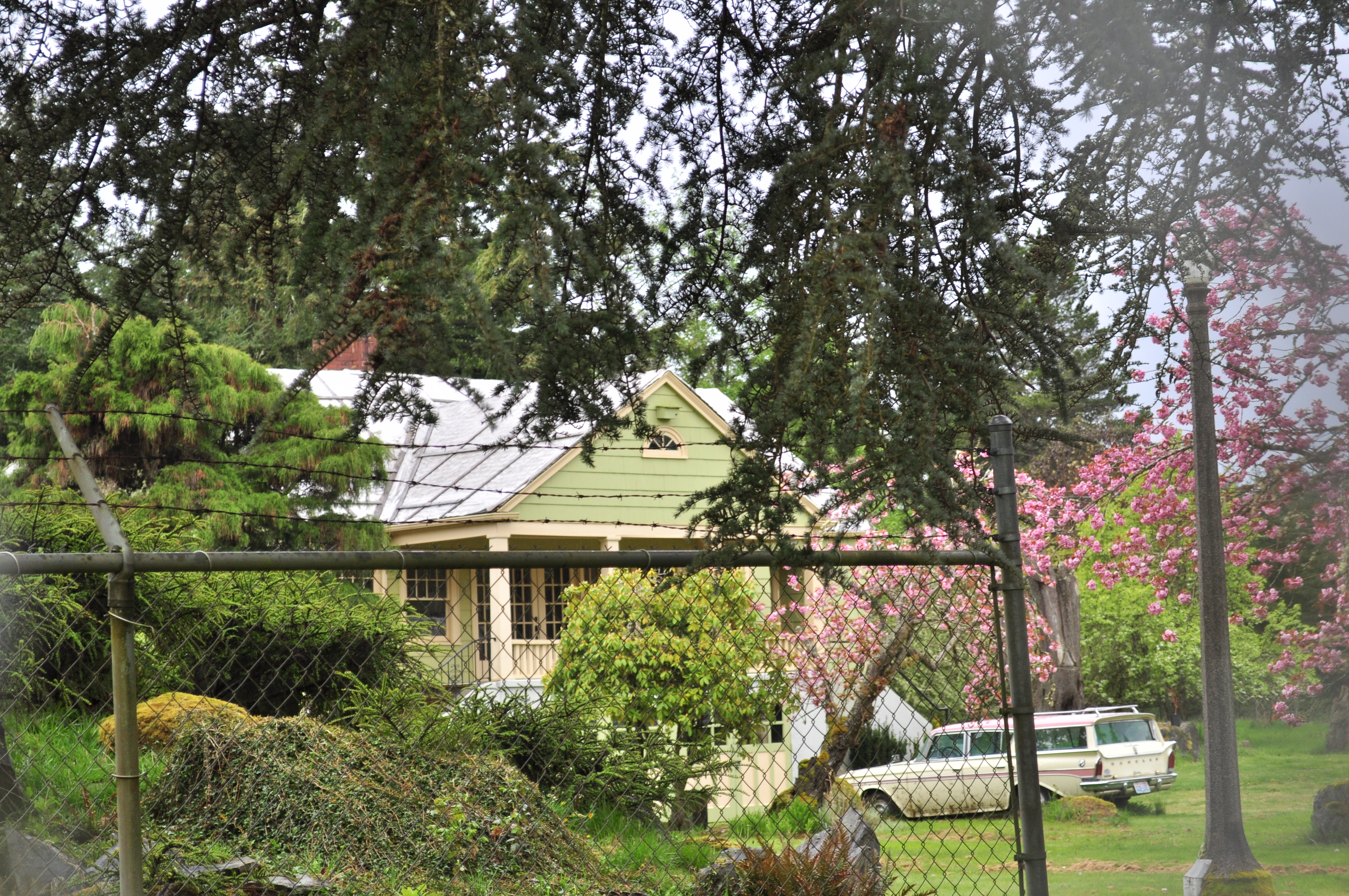
The former Mukai residence on the same property as the plant (photographed 2014)

The Japanese-born Mukai couple could not own land in the United States, so in 1926 they purchased a 40-acre site (including the current Barrelling Plant site) in the name of their young son Masahiro ("Masa"), born 1911. B.D. designed an American-style residence typical of the Pacific Northwest; Kuni designed a traditional Japanese tsukiyama (hill garden; see Japanese gardens) next to it.

Masa went on to be a prominent figure in the strawberry industry. He received an engineering degree from Washington State University, developed new farming techniques, and working with the United States Department of Agriculture at the Spokane Street Cold Storage in Seattle was a pioneer of frozen fruit. In 1931 Masa married Mamie Kushi; they had a son, Milton, the following year, but divorced in 1936. In 1937 he married again, to Chiyeko Wakasugi whose family farmed strawberries on Bainbridge Island, an island in Puget Sound north of Vashon.

As Masa increasingly took over the business it became "Mukai and Son". The Mukai operation did well despite the Great Depression, employing 400 to 500 seasonal workers, including the pickers. Among these were Native Americans who came from Vancouver Island by canoe. In 1938 the company was renamed as the Vashon Island Packing Company or VIPCO. Eventually, the company's business became just canning and freezing rather than farming.

The business survived the Japanese American internment during World War II. Executive Order 9066 (issued February 19, 1942) ordered the relocation of all Japanese Americans living west of the Columbia River to internment camps. Masa Mukai had the good fortune to be a personal acquaintance of the Lieutenant Commander of the Western Defense Command, and was notified two weeks before the evacuation order, allowing him to move his family (himself, his wife, his son Milton and stepmother Kuni) voluntarily to Dead Ox Flats, Oregon, across the Snake River from Weiser, Idaho, where Chiyeko's brother lived. His hauler Morris Dunsford operated the business in his absence; Masa Mukai worked in the seed industry in Idaho during the war years and, according to the NPS, "became a respected member of the community" there. He overcame the anti-Japanese prejudices of the locals, introduced row crops in what had previously been primarily cattle country, and invented a seed harvester to capture seeds that would otherwise have been blown away by the area's strong winds.

After the war, the Mukais returned to Vashon, but the strawberry business there was no longer profitable. Although he did build a packing plant on the mainland near the Canada–US border in Lynden, Washington, and leased another in Forest Grove, Oregon, he drew more on his engineering skills and worked in areas such as the design of sewer systems and water distribution mains, pipeline construction and home building. He slowly sold off the Vashon properties; the plant itself was sold in 1969 to a bean sprout company, and has changed hands several times since then.

B. D. Mukai retired in 1935. By this time he and Kuni had divorced. He married for a third time, and traveled extensively. According to Mary Matthews, the outbreak of World War II caught him in Hong Kong. He went to Japan, where he witnessed the bombing of cities and nearly starved to death. After the war, he experienced legal difficulties in returning to the U.S. He eventually settled in Claremont, California. In 1968 he went back to Japan and told his son to sell his (B.D. Mukai's) California property and send him the balance of his bank accounts, with which he purchased and restored the family's ancestral home in Osaka, where he died in 1973. Masa Mukai died in 1999.

== The complex ==
The surviving Mukai Agricultural Complex at the end of 107th Avenue S.W. on Vashon Island overlooks the former strawberry fields. The one-story wood frame Barrelling Plant building was designed by Masa Mukai and built by local contractor Deb Harrington. Also on the property are a small brick office building designed and a residence, another both designed by B. D. Mukai. The NPS states that, "The plant is an excellent vernacular example of agricultural industrial architecture, and the house is a well-preserved example of eclectic vernacular architecture with Arts and Crafts and Neoclassical elements of a type built throughout the Pacific Northwest in the late 1920s. The foundation of the two-story house is concrete, and a full basement features a two-car garage on the north. Constructed in a modified ell-plan, the Mukai residence possesses multiple gable roofs sheathed in wood shingles. The formal garden, also included in the historic area, retains interest as a vernacular expression of the adaptation and blending of traditional Japanese garden elements and plant materials with American suburban residential landscaping. It retains most of its original design and many of its original plantings. In its prime, the Mukai garden attracted visitors from on and off the island and was photographed for postcards. The garden also served for notable social functions when tea parties were held to view the cherry blossoms in the early spring." The lettering on the plant—"Mukai Cold Process Fruit Barrelling Plant—is a modern (1993) reproduction "in jazzier blue-gray".

The designation of the plant as a King County landmark coincided with the 1993 Asia-Pacific Economic Cooperation forum, held in Seattle. The King County landmark designation covers a larger area than the NRHP designation, 11 acres (4.5 ha) rather than 4.8 acres (1.9 ha).

In 2000, the house and garden, were purchased by non-profit Island Landmarks for $327,806, out of a $469,200 fund for their purchase and restoration. Funds came from the National Park Service, the Washington State Legislature, the Casteel Family Foundation, the King County Office of Historic Preservation, and the King County Office of Cultural Resources, among others. The plan was to restore the garden, develop interpretive public exhibits, maintain the facilities, provide programs and educational opportunities with "free or reduced cost" admissions. According to Helen Meeker, "none of these provisions were fully implemented by Island Landmarks," nor was "an annual review with funding agencies."

In June 2012, the members of Island Landmarks attempted to remove the board and elect a new board, but found themselves locked out of the property by a deer fence suddenly installed by former board members. The new board filed a lawsuit against the former board and has renewed fundraising.

Originally, the old board (Mary Matthews, et al.) won a summary judgment overturning the June 2012 election, but on December 23, 2013, a three-judge panel of the Washington Court of Appeals overruled the decision and also sent the case back to superior court. On 2 April 2015 King County Superior Court Judge Monica Benton ruled in favor of the new board.

The new board group, calling themselves “ Friends of Mukai” formed a non-profit and in 2016 and gained control of the Mukai home and garden parcel. In the interim, they hosted relevant programming and hired Artifacts Consulting to develop a 246 page Historic Preservation Plan, a blueprint for restoration of the Mukai Agricultural Complex features. In 2016, the Friends of Mukai then began implementation of the Preservation Plan to restore the Mukai complex using a phased approach. In 2017, the Friends’ state representative secured $350,000 from the state capital budget, and this, along with $50,000 in community funds, directed this to King County to purchase the Mukai Barreling Plant 2.2. acre parcel. King County, as owners of the Barreling Plant, ceded control to Friends of Mukai, effectively unifying key remaining components of the original farm. By June of 2019, Friends of Mukai had successfully overseen the fundraising and construction necessary to fully restore the Mukai house and garden, improve access to the site for people with disabilities, conduct a structural analysis of the Fruit Barreling Plant, and begin the stabilization of the building.

Restoration of the 90 year-old Mukai Cold Process Fruit Barreling Plant is now underway; Friends of Mukai recently completed stabilization work at a cost of $842,000 which covered extensive structural support to remedy failing damaged wood, replacement of the entire 100’ long west side, new siding, and installation of a new roof with encapsulated insulation.

Finishing the remaining restoration work of the Mukai Cold Process Fruit Barreling Plant represents the final phase of the Friends of Mukai’s ambitious Historic Preservation Plan.
