= Baring Bridge =

- U.S. National Register of Historic Places
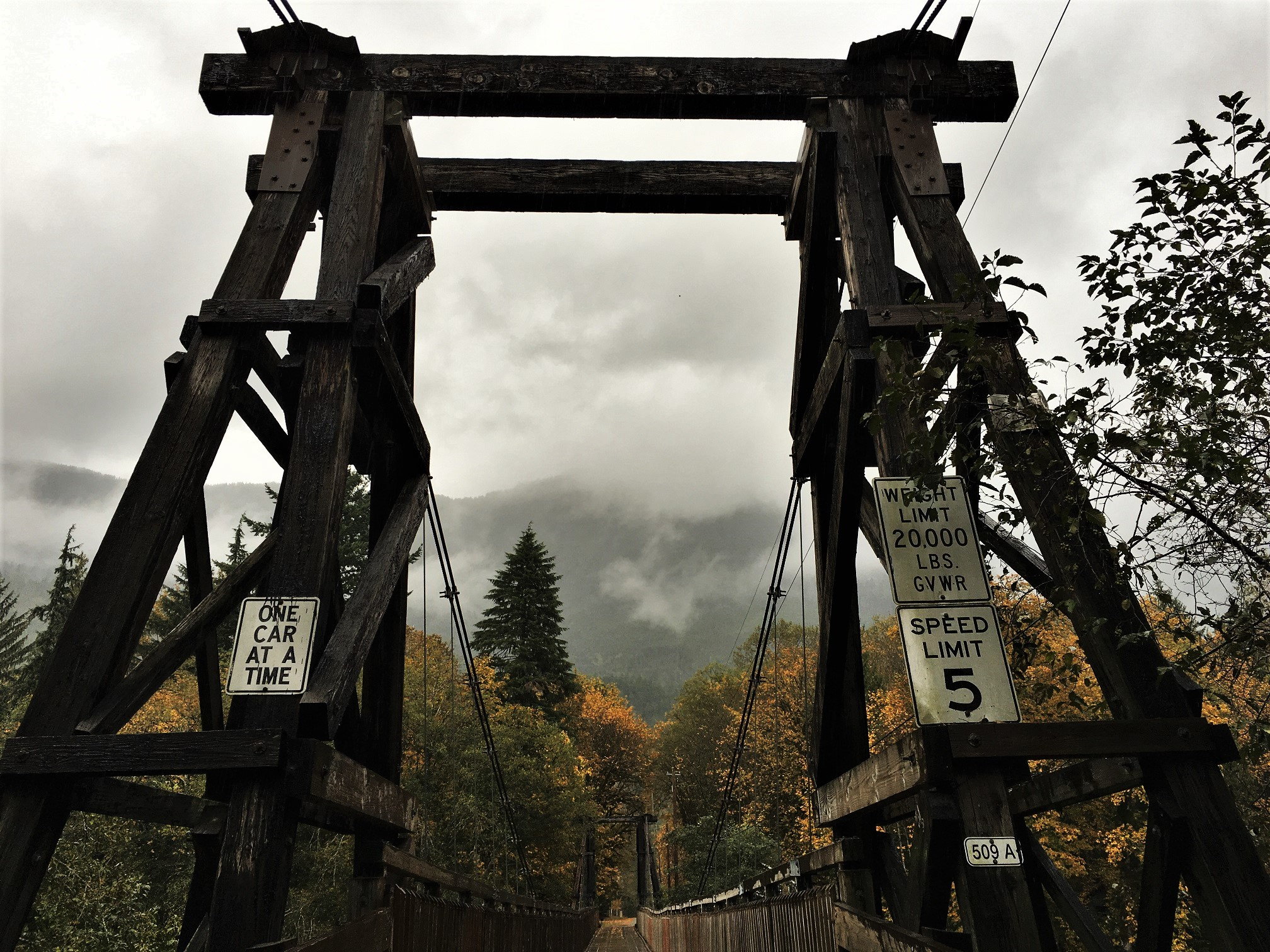
- Baring Bridge

- Location within Washington (state)
- Location: South fork of the Skykomish River
- Coordinates: 47.765472°N 121.479786°W
- Built: 1930
- Built by: Henry McBride
- NRHP reference No.: 100004331
- Added to NRHP: August 26, 2019

Baring Bridge is a one-lane wood and steel cable suspension bridge crossing the South Fork Skykomish River in Baring, Washington, United States. It carries Index Creek Road, which connects a rural area to U.S. Route 2 in unincorporated King County. Built in 1930, it is one of only two wooden suspension bridges designed for vehicle use in Washington that remain active and was added to the National Register of Historic Places in August 2019.

== Description ==
Construction of the Baring Bridge was completed in 1930, replacing an older bridge of similar design built around 1912–1913. The main suspension span of the bridge is 10.5 feet (3.2 m) wide and 272 feet (83 m) long, with two wooden approach ramps that bring the total length to 334 feet (102 m). Two pairs of main cables are anchored by large concrete blocks in the ground. The secondary suspension cables are attached to floor beams with eyebolt and ring connections. The north and south towers were rebuilt in 1958. In 1975, the weight restriction was set to 3 tons, later raised to 10 tons in 1995 after major repairs were made.

== History ==
In the late nineteenth century, the area around the Skykomish River had many mining claims and rock quarries. The Baring Bridge provides the only access to people residing on the south side of the river in the community of Baring. The first Baring Bridge, designed by J.G. McCormack was built in 1912, then closed to vehicles by 1921. This bridge was replaced by the 1930 bridge, which shared a similar design.

A heavy snowstorm in 1952 caused the bridge deck to collapse, pulling the cables out of their anchorage. Repairs included new concrete anchorages and a superstructure of untreated timber.

In 1990, the Skykomish River suffered a 100-year flood, causing moderate damage to the Baring Bridge. Major repairs in 1994–1995 replaced the decking, enlarged concrete anchors, and replaced steel rods with high-strength cable. More repairs to the bridge were made in 2000, 2007, and 2017.

In 2019, the Baring Bridge Replacement Project was established to plan for a replacement bridge. Construction is scheduled to begin in 2026 with work taking approximately two years to complete. The Baring Bridge is one of only two remaining wooden suspension bridges for vehicles in the state, alongside the Longmire Bridge which crosses the Nisqually River in Mount Rainier National Park, which contains no original timbers since it was rebuilt in 2005.
