= Selleck, Washington =

Unincorporated community in Washington, United States

- Selleck Historic District
- U.S. National Register of Historic Places
- U.S. Historic district
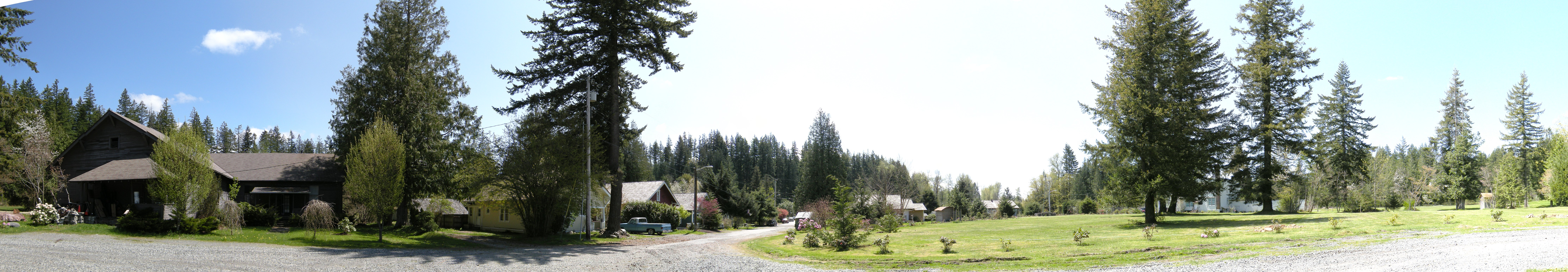
- Selleck, Washington

- Location within Washington (state)
- Nearest city: Maple Valley, Washington
- Area: 18 acres (7.3 ha)
- Architectural style: Bungalow/craftsman
- NRHP reference No.: 89000214
- Added to NRHP: March 16, 1989

Selleck (founded in 1908) is a former company town in Washington, located at 47°22′33″N 121°52′0″W. As the sole surviving company mill town in King County, it is listed on the National Register of Historic Places and as a King County landmark.

== Origins ==
Located on the plain abutting the mountains of southeast King County, Selleck was the company town of Pacific States Lumber, under the direction of lumberman Frank Selleck. It was completed in 1916, accessed by the world's highest railway trestle, 204 feet above the Cedar River. The mill played a role in the rebuilding of Tokyo after the 1923 Great Kantō earthquake. At that time many Japanese workers and their families came to Selleck. This was not the first time Japanese workmen were brought to the mill.

== Japanese immigrant community ==
The Japanese area outside the main town was officially known as Lavender Town (after the owner of a local saloon and general store), but was better known as Jap Town. Children of the Japanese workers attended the Selleck School, and also attended a Japanese-language school on Wednesday and Saturday mornings. However, few traces remain of Lavender Town today, not even grave markers (which are believed to have been made of wood). The only visible indication of the former Japanese presence is a pond landscaped with bamboo. Hence, Selleck's landmark designations do not include the former Lavender Town, because so few traces remain. It is possible that future archaeological excavations might lead to such a designation.

== Decline ==
At its peak, Selleck had a population of 900 and had a hospital, two hotels, a community hall with weekly dances, a school, a number of stores and several mill buildings. Pacific States Lumber declared bankruptcy in 1939, bringing an end to Selleck's prosperity. The town of Selleck went through a series of owners—the first purchased it for a mere $3,000—before Robert Schaefer, a general contractor from Renton, Washington, formed an investor group to buy the town in 1971.

Schaefer's vision for the town was not fully achieved. He hoped to restore the millpond, with paddleboats, a train around the pond, and a logging theme park. However, this proved impossible due to a combination of wetlands regulation and lack of sufficient funding.

There were serious problems with the town's water system in the 1990s.

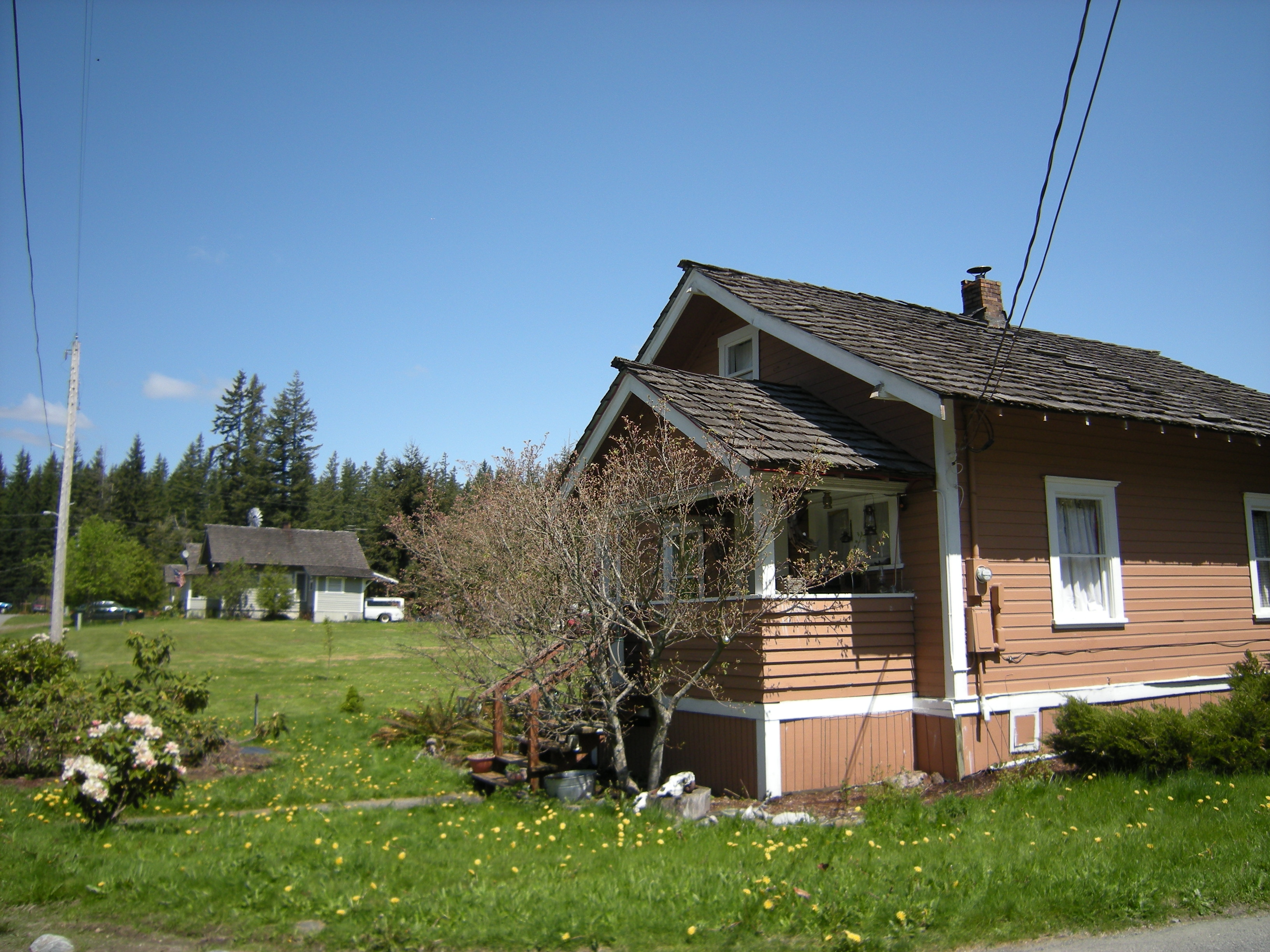
Selleck, 2009

== Selleck today ==
As of 2007, the town is owned by Robert Schaefer's son Tim Schaefer. The former two-story schoolhouse and former community hall remains. About half of the original single-story company houses remain, and people live in 50 bungalows. A four-bedroom house in Selleck rents for about what a two-bedroom apartment costs in more accessible parts of the county.
