= Fall City Masonic Hall =

- Falls City Masonic Hall
- U.S. National Register of Historic Places
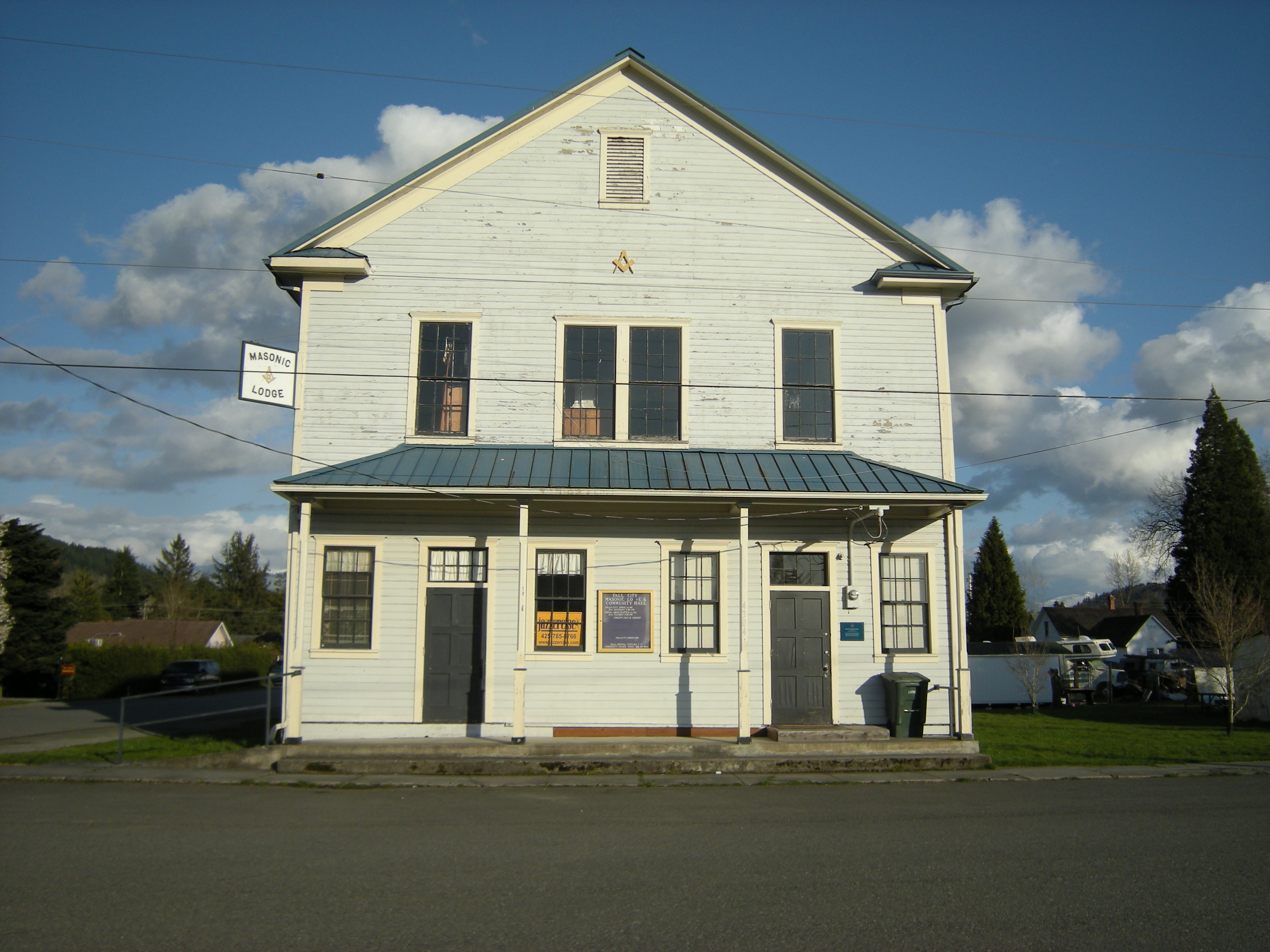

- Location within Washington (state)
- Location: 4304 337th Place SE, Fall City, Washington
- Coordinates: 47°34′0.65″N 121°53′25.76″W
- Area: less than one acre
- Built: 1895
- NRHP reference No.: 04000922
- Added to NRHP: August 25, 2004

The Fall City Masonic Hall is a historic meeting hall located in Fall City, Washington. It was added to the National Register of Historic Places in 2004 under its original name of Falls City Masonic Hall.

The hall was built in 1895 and dedicated on July 3, 1896. It served as a meeting hall for the Falls City Masonic Lodge #66 and associated Masonic bodies. The Lodge room on the second floor can hold 160 people, and the dining room on the first floor has an even larger capacity. It also has a full-width front porch.
