= Neely Mansion =

Historic house in Washington, United States

- Aaron Neely, Sr. Mansion
- U.S. National Register of Historic Places
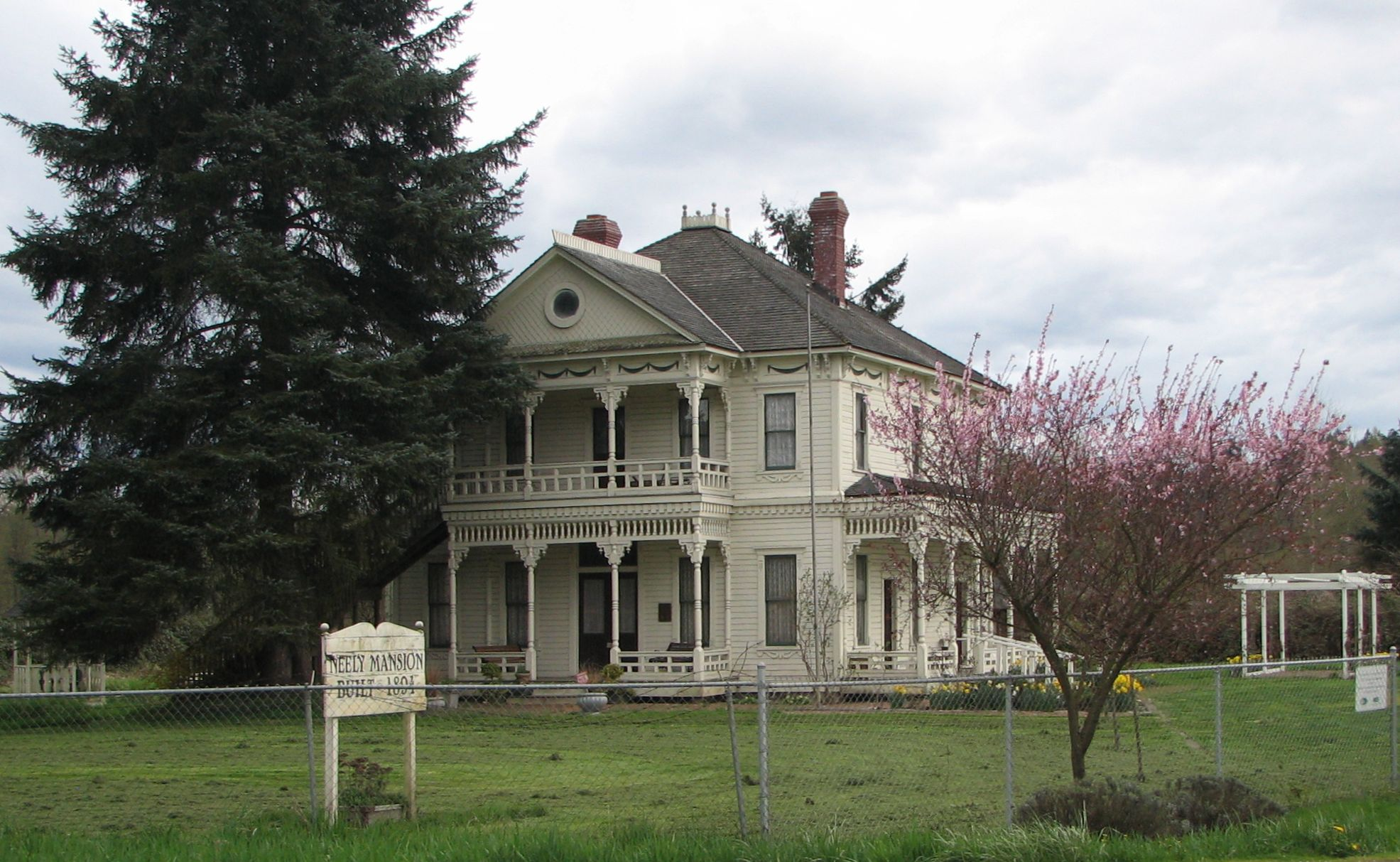
- Neely Mansion, Spring of 2006

- Location within Washington (state)
- Location: Highway 18 near Auburn, Washington
- Coordinates: 47°18′1.3″N 122°10′39.3″W
- Area: less than one acre
- Built: 1894
- Architectural style: Victorian
- NRHP reference No.: 74001955
- Added to NRHP: October 15, 1974

The Neely Mansion, is a Victorian-style residence built in 1894. It is located near the eastern edge of Auburn, in unincorporated King County, Washington in the census-designated location Lake Morton-Berrydale, Washington. It is listed in the National Register of Historic Places and the Washington State Heritage Register.

From the 1950s to the 1970s, the building deteriorated severely, until local citizens moved to save and restore the building. During the initial restoration period, the mansion was used for a haunted house staffed by the drama department of Auburn High School (the only high school in Auburn at the time). That usage ceased when significant progress was made in restoring the mansion to its original condition. The mansion is now owned by a volunteer historical society.

== Design ==
The Mansion is a two-story clapboard with a square plan. The front doorway is centered between two windows, with three windows on the other three sides. All have an entablature and decorated surrounds. Sawn scrollwork is placed below each lintel. A decorative corbel table separates the first and second floors. There are side porches on the ground level that run the length of the house. The front porch has a second floor balcony covered by a gable. The interior of the boxed, pedimented gable cornice is filled with diamond pattern shingles with a central round window.

== Interior ==
The house has high ceilings and spacious rooms. The first floor is the kitchen, dining room, parlor, and master bedroom. The second floor has more bedrooms. The lower five feet (1.5 m) of the walls in the house are covered with maple paneling. The upper portion is white plaster. Lighting in the house was supplied by candles and oil chandeliers which were hung from the ceiling and could be raised and lowered by hand. Before World War II electricity was added, and in 1948 it was reshingled, a new foundation provided, and a concrete base added to the front porch.

== Neely family ==
The David Neely family was among the first to arrive in Washington's Green River Valley. After having made a hazardous overland journey from Tennessee in 1853, they crossed the Naches Pass and arrived at Porter's Prairie near Enumclaw in Washington territory. He settled in Kent. He and his family both avoided being killed by Indians who attacked the area in 1855. David Neely's son Aaron moved to Auburn, married; and a daughter Lenore was born in 1879. Soon after the birth, Aaron moved to the site of the Neely Mansion, which he and a few workmen built in 1894.

Many gala parties were held for friends and neighbors who would spend the night in the house during shopping excursions to Auburn. On those occasions, all the doors on the lower floor would be opened, and the dancing partners would swirl from room to room to the music provided by the local fiddlers.

Until the mid-1970s, the Neely family owned the property. The Neely Mansion Association, an all-volunteer organization, bought the building in 1984 and began restoring the home.

== Significance ==
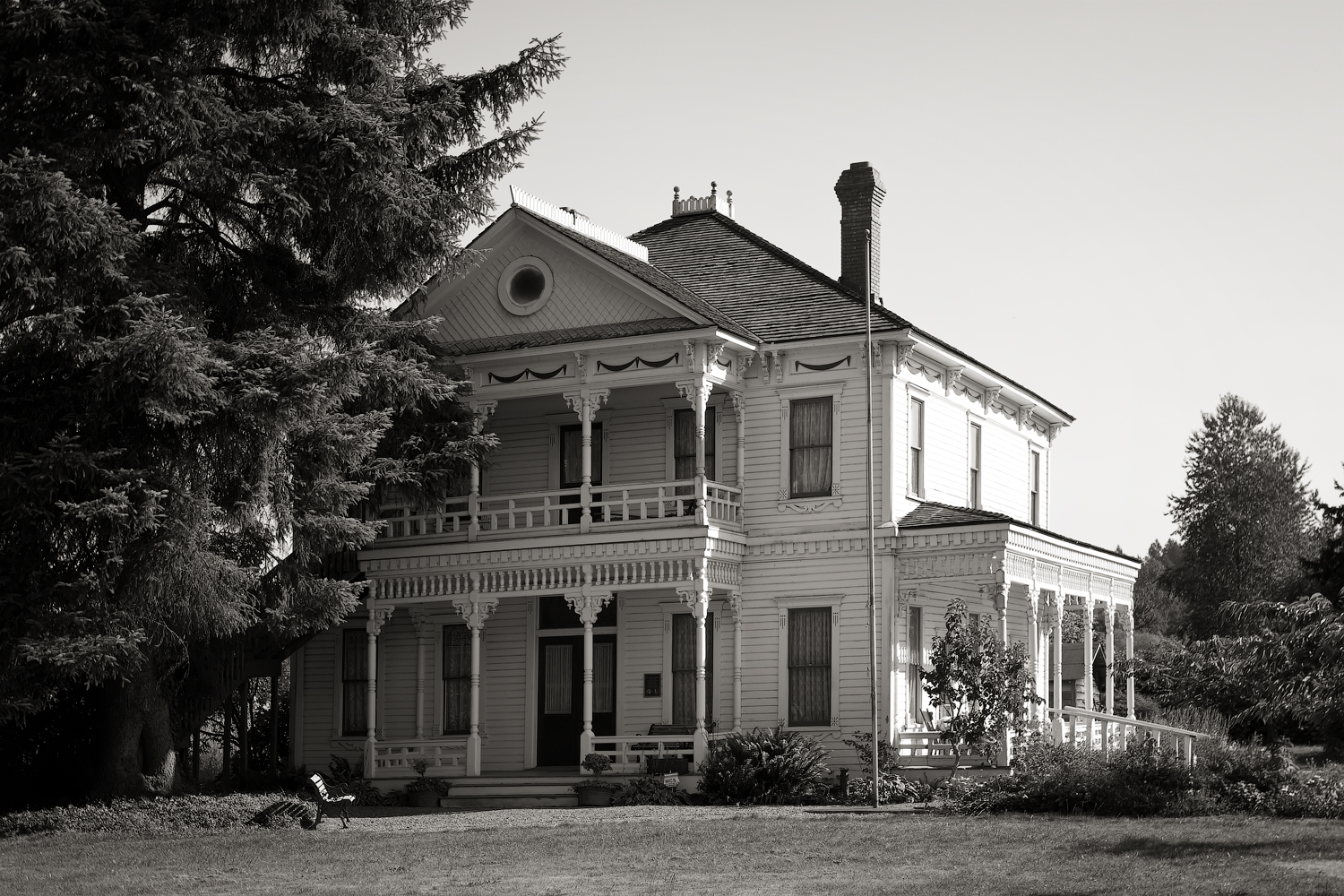
Neely Mansion in Auburn, WA

The Neely Mansion is a significant piece of house architecture in that it demonstrates the effect of readily available manufactured wooden decorative components on a very basic plan. It is also significant as an indicator of growing affluence in family areas close to Seattle and as an important social center for the Green River Valley.
