= Midwest Athletic Club =

- U.S. National Register of Historic Places
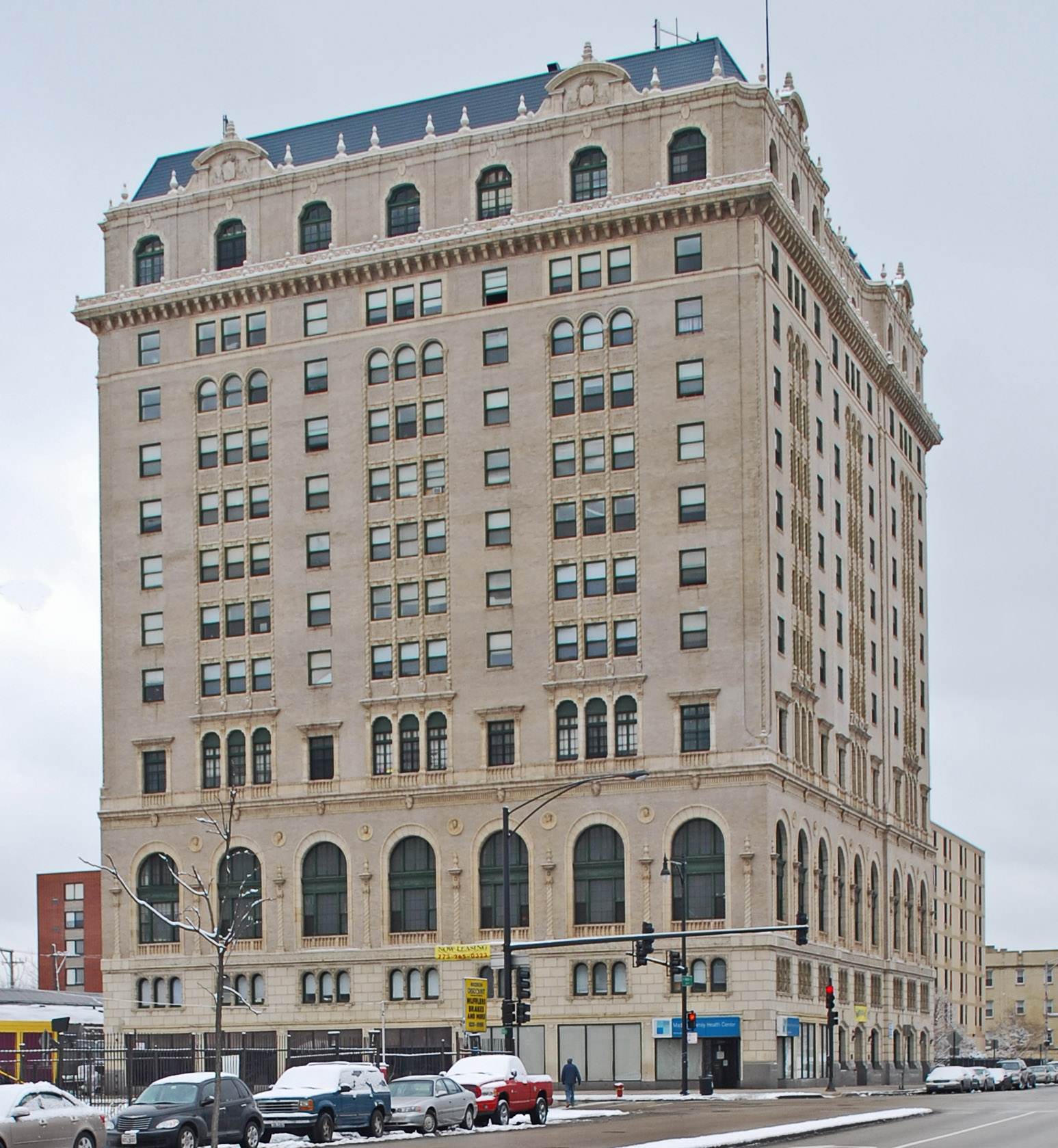

- Location within Chicago metropolitan area Location within Illinois Location within the United States
- Location: 6 N. Hamlin Ave., Chicago, Illinois
- Coordinates: 41°52′52″N 87°43′16″W
- Area: 0.2 acres (0.081 ha)
- Built: 1926-28
- Architect: Michaelsen & Rognstad
- NRHP reference No.: 84000138
- Added to NRHP: October 18, 1984

The Midwest Athletic Club is a historic athletic club building located at 6 N. Hamlin Ave. in the West Garfield Park community area of Chicago, Illinois. The club was built in 1926-28 under the direction of a committee of West Side business leaders. The thirteen-story building's design featured ornamental terra cotta, large arched windows on the third floor, and a mansard roof; it also provided views of Garfield Park, the north side of which was across the street. Its facilities included an Olympic-sized swimming pool, a gymnasium and exercise rooms, handball courts, billiard rooms, a library, dining rooms, and a ballroom. The club grew to include 2000 members in its first year, most of them businessmen and their families; however, the building entered receivership in 1930 and was converted into a hotel.

The building was listed on the National Register of Historic Places on October 18, 1984. A plaque next to the building's Hamlin Street entrance commemorates its listing on the National Register, its construction in 1926-28 and a 1990s renovation.
