= South Park Bridge =

Drawbridge in Seattle, Washington, United States

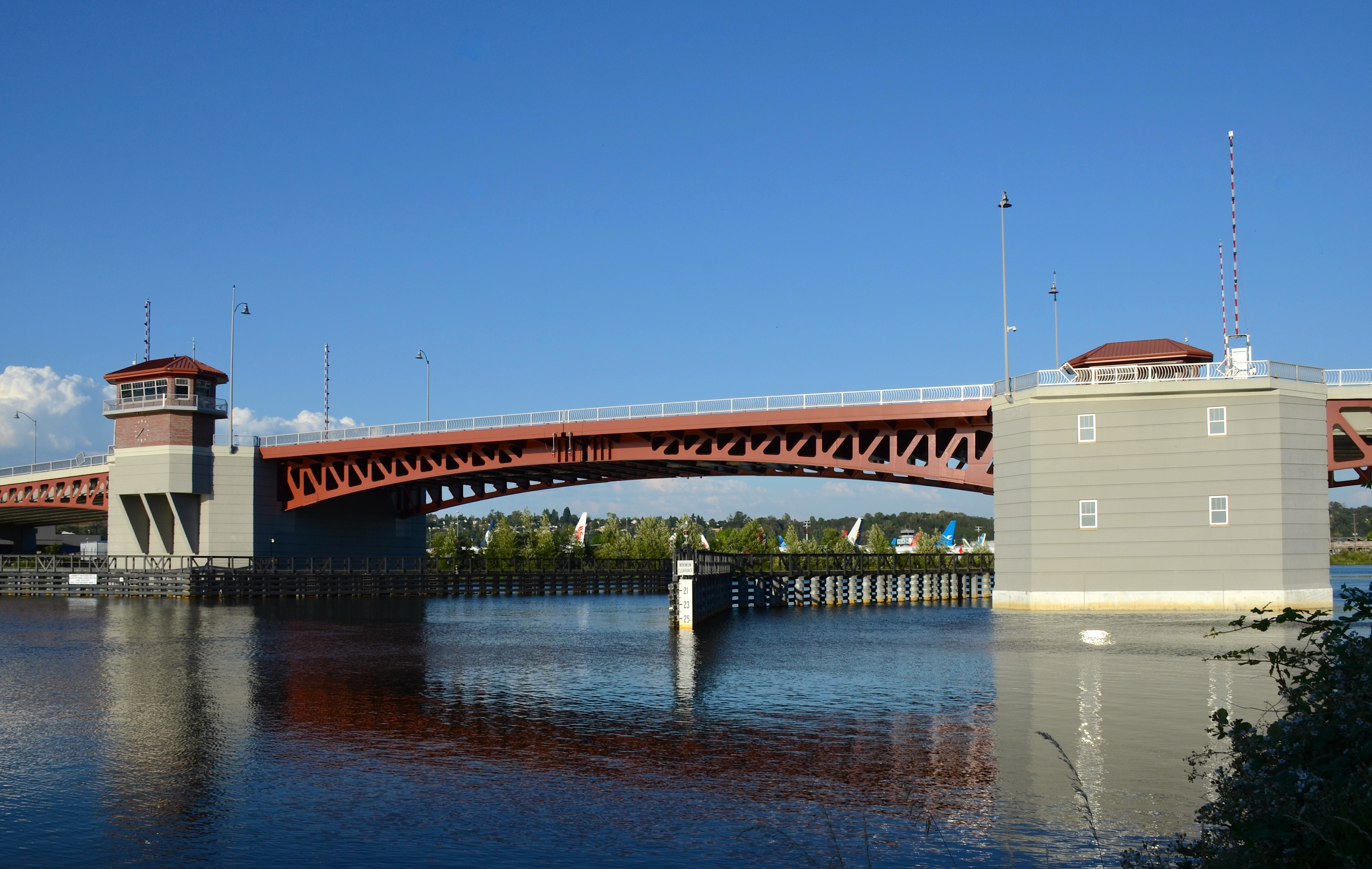
- New South Park Bridge in 2022
- Coordinates: 47°31′45″N 122°18′50″W
- Crosses: Duwamish River
- Locale: South Park, Seattle, Washington
- Maintained by: King County, Washington

Characteristics
- Design: Double-leaf bascule
- Total length: 1,285 feet (392 m) (original bridge)
- Longest span: Bascule span: 190 feet (58 m) (two 95-foot leaves)

History
- Designer: HNTB
- Constructed by: Kiewit-Massman
- Construction start: 2011
- Opened: 2014

Location
- Interactive map of South Park Bridge

The South Park Bridge (also called the 14th/16th Avenue South Bridge) is a double-leaf bascule bridge in Seattle, Washington, United States. Opened in 2014, the current bridge replaced a 1931 bascule bridge that carried the same name and had been listed on the National Register of Historic Places. The bridge is operated by the King County government. It carries automobile traffic over the Duwamish River near Boeing Field, just outside the city limits of Seattle, and is named for the nearby South Park neighborhood of Seattle.

== First bridge ==
- 14th Avenue South Bridge
- U.S. National Register of Historic Places
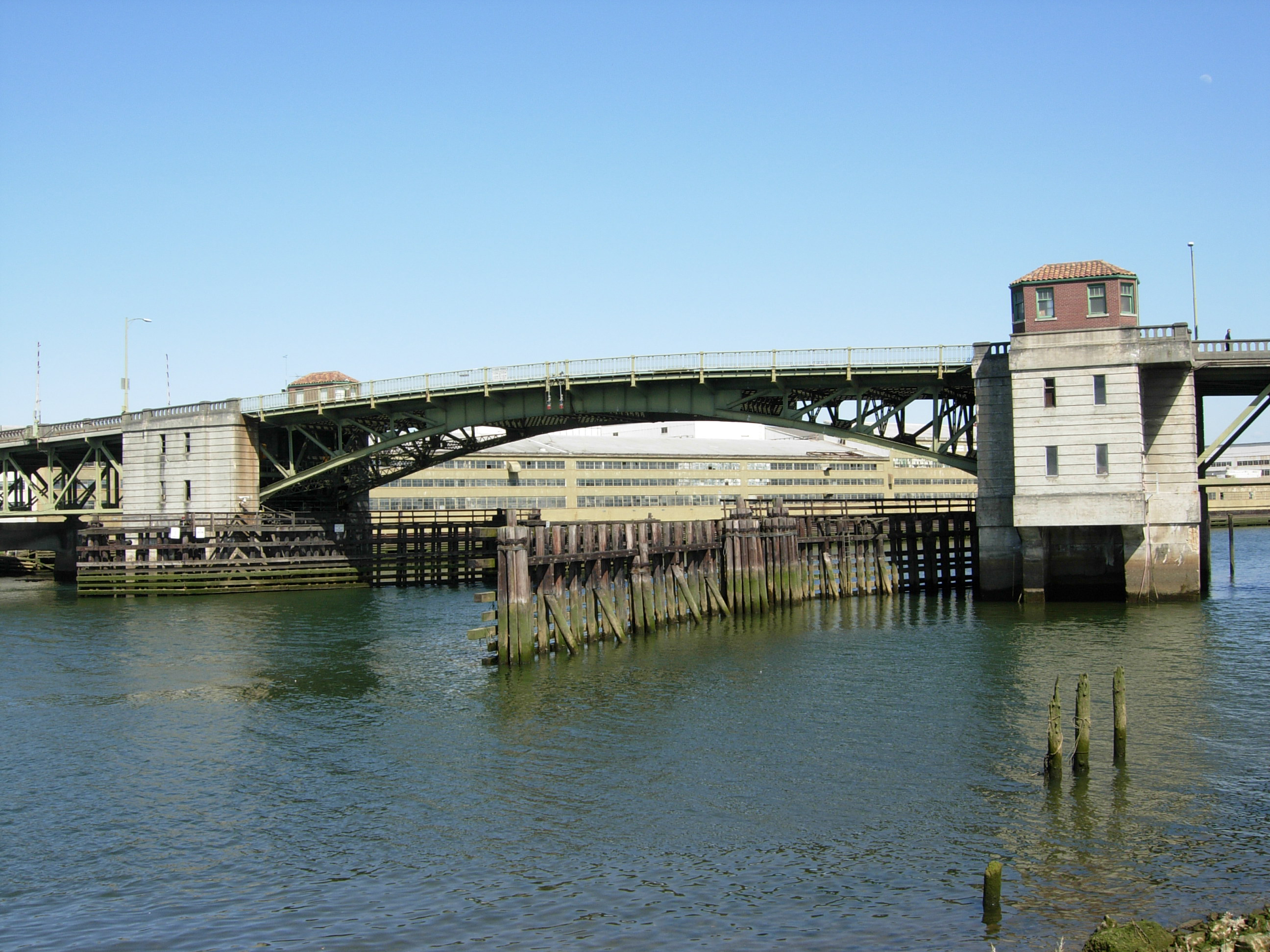
- The first South Park Bridge, now demolished, in 2007
- Location: Spans Duwamish River, Seattle, Washington
- Coordinates: 47°31′45.5″N 122°18′50.7″W
- Built: 1931
- Built by: King County Engineering Department
- Architectural style: Scherzer Rolling Lift bascule
- Demolished: 2011
- MPS: Historic Bridges/Tunnels in Washington State TR
- NRHP reference No.: 82004228
- Added to NRHP: July 16, 1982

The original bridge was a Scherzer rolling lift double-leaf bascule bridge constructed in 1929–31. It was listed on the National Register of Historic Places in 1982, as the 14th Avenue South Bridge. As of around 2009, about 20,000 vehicles used the bridge daily, and it was a main connection to South Park's main business district.

The original bridge was already in poor condition when it was further damaged by the Nisqually earthquake of 2001. In 2002, King County inspectors gave the bridge a score of 6 out of a possible 100, per Federal Highway Administration criteria, and the rating later fell to as low as 4. This compares to a score of 50 for the I-35W Mississippi River bridge, which collapsed in August 2007. However, due to a lack of county, state and federal funding for a proposed replacement project, the South Park Bridge continued to operate in its deteriorated condition.

Although plans to build a new bridge were ready, the project failed to receive a $99 million federal TIGER I grant in early 2010. The bridge was finally closed June 30, 2010, at 7:00 p.m. Earlier that month, King County secured $10 million toward the replacement of bridge. Dismantling of the bridge began in late August 2010, with removal of the lift span sections, even while the outlook for the proposed replacement project remained unclear. County officials subsequently secured funds for replacement of the entire bridge, and work to replace the bridge began in May 2011.

== Second bridge ==
In August 2010, the County submitted a grant application for $36.2 million in federal funds from the second round of federal Transportation Investment Generating Economic Recovery grants, TIGER II, for replacement of the original bridge. On October 15, 2010, it was announced that the project had been awarded $34 million in TIGER II financing, filling the funding gap and allowing work to replace the bridge to move forward. In March 2011, King County announced that the new bridge would be constructed by Kiewit-Massman, a joint venture of Kiewit Infrastructure West Company and Massman Construction Company. Construction of the new bridge began in May 2011.

A ceremonial grand opening event was held for the newly completed South Park Bridge on June 29, 2014, and it officially opened to traffic the following day, June 30, 2014.

== See also ==
- Past South Park bridges
