= West End Wheelmen's Club =

- U.S. National Register of Historic Places
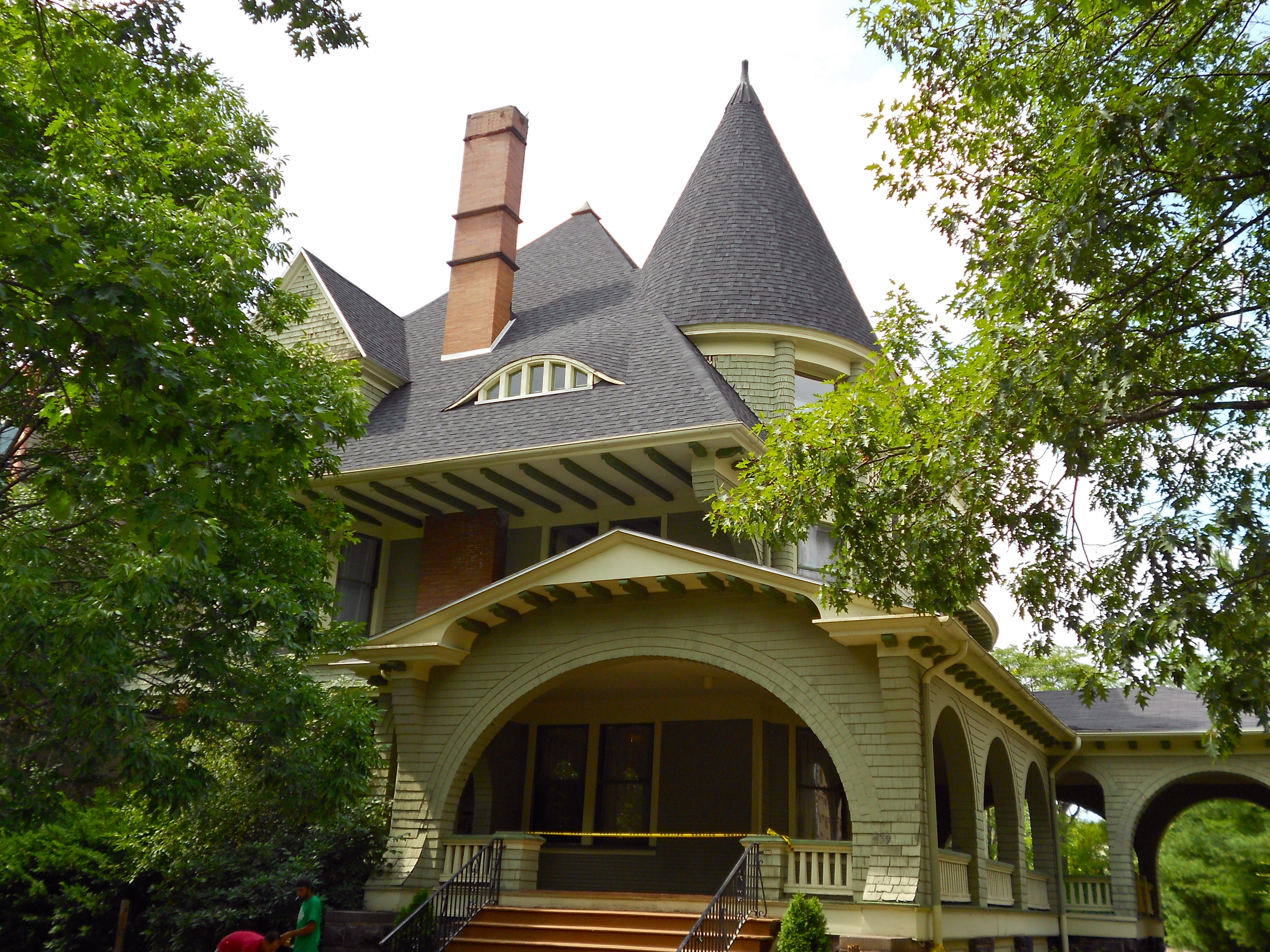
- Front entrance

- Location within Pennsylvania Location within the United States
- Location: 439 S. Franklin St., Wilkes-Barre, Pennsylvania
- Coordinates: 41°14′24″N 75°53′47″W
- Area: 0.5 acres (0.20 ha)
- Built: 1897, 1913
- Built by: O'Malley, William
- Architect: Olds, Frederick L.
- Architectural style: Shingle Style
- NRHP reference No.: 97000521
- Added to NRHP: May 30, 1997

West End Wheelmen's Club, also known as the Franklin Club and Knights of Columbus, is a historic clubhouse located at Wilkes-Barre, Luzerne County, Pennsylvania. It was built in 1897, and is a three-story, rectangular frame Shingle Style building. It features a wraparound porch and porte cochere. The rear of the building was rebuilt after a fire in 1913.

It was added to the National Register of Historic Places in 1997.

== Gallery ==
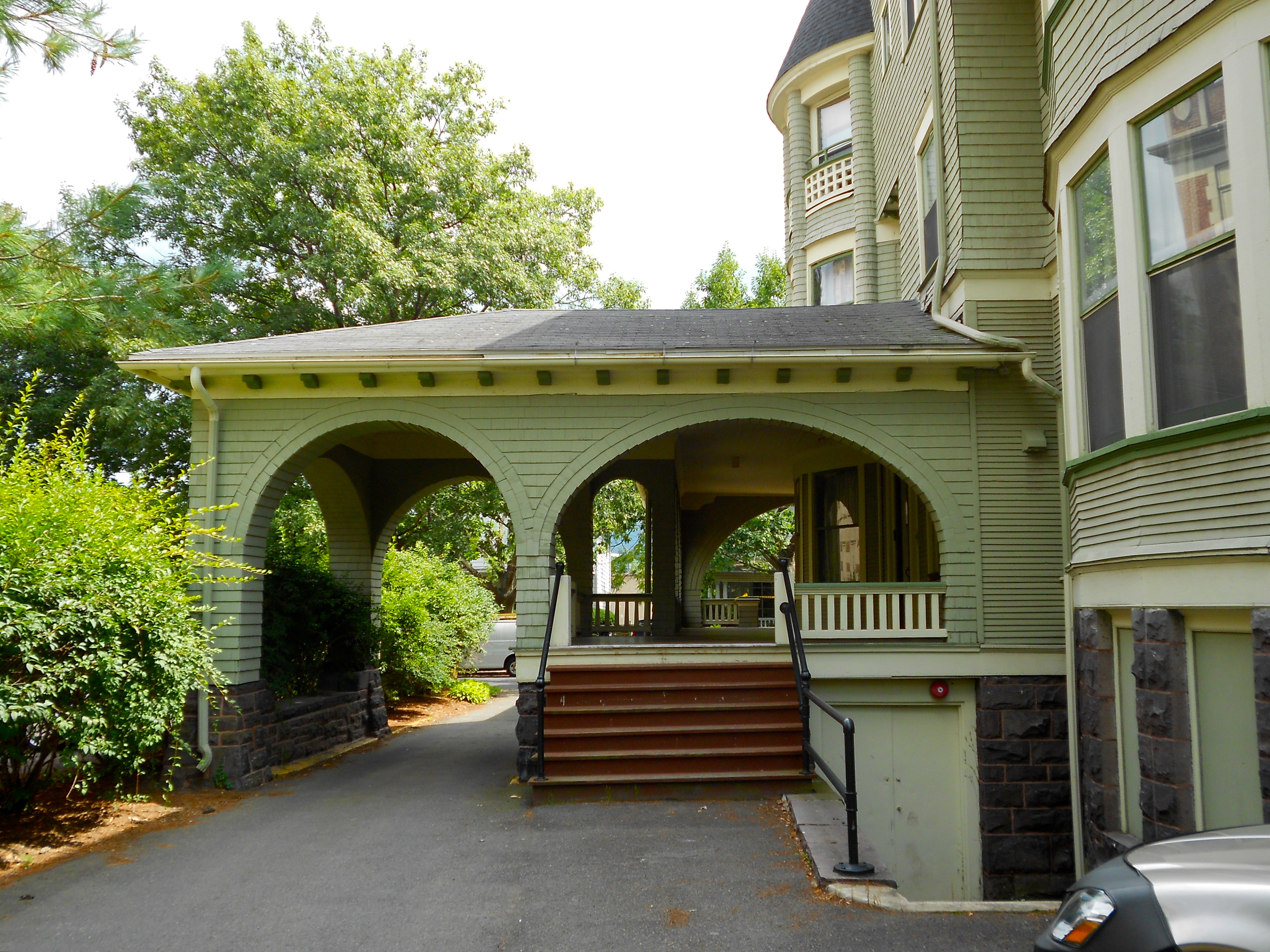
Side entry

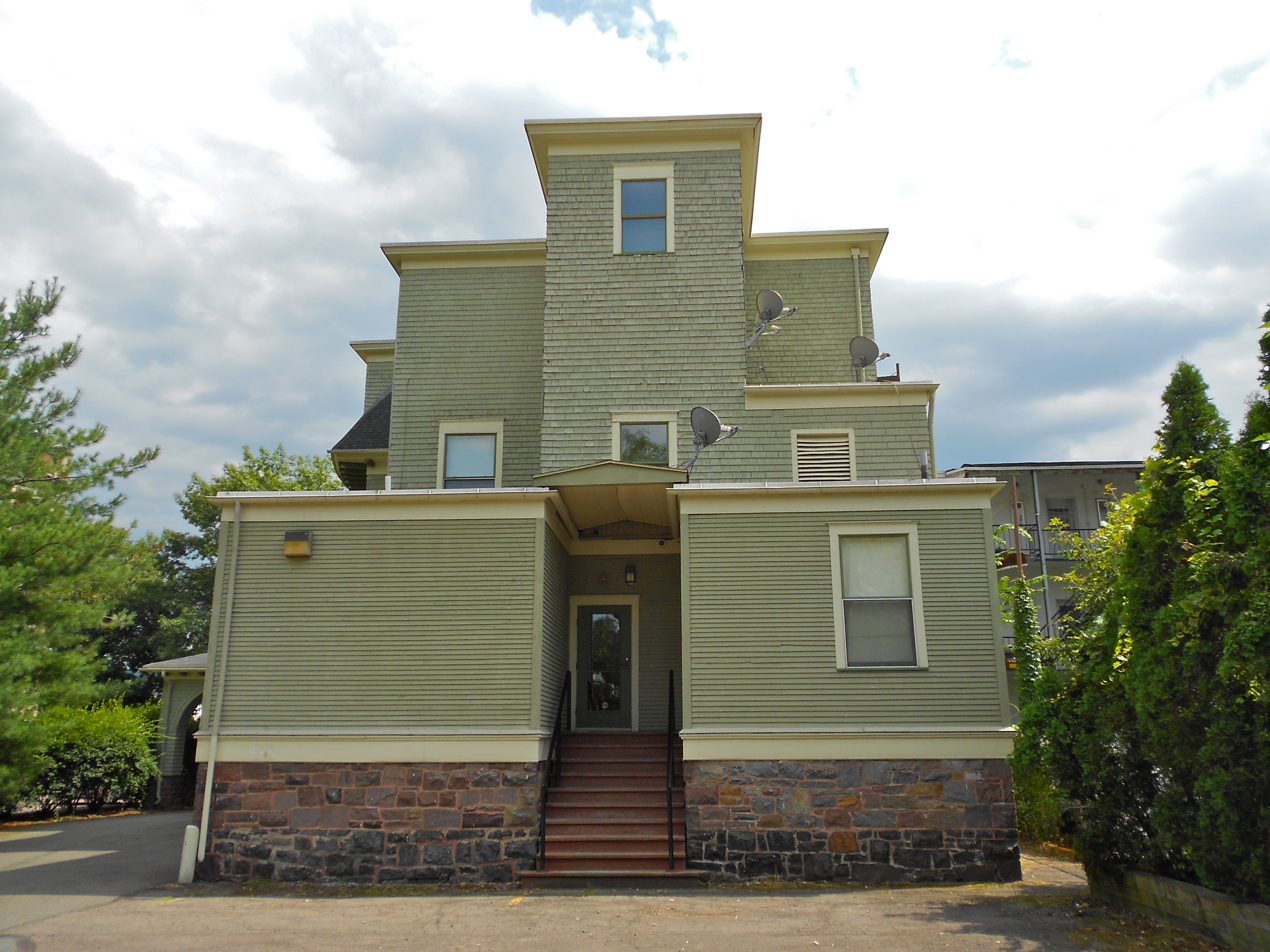
Rear
