= South Park, Seattle =

Neighborhood of Seattle, Washington, US

- Seattle Neighborhood
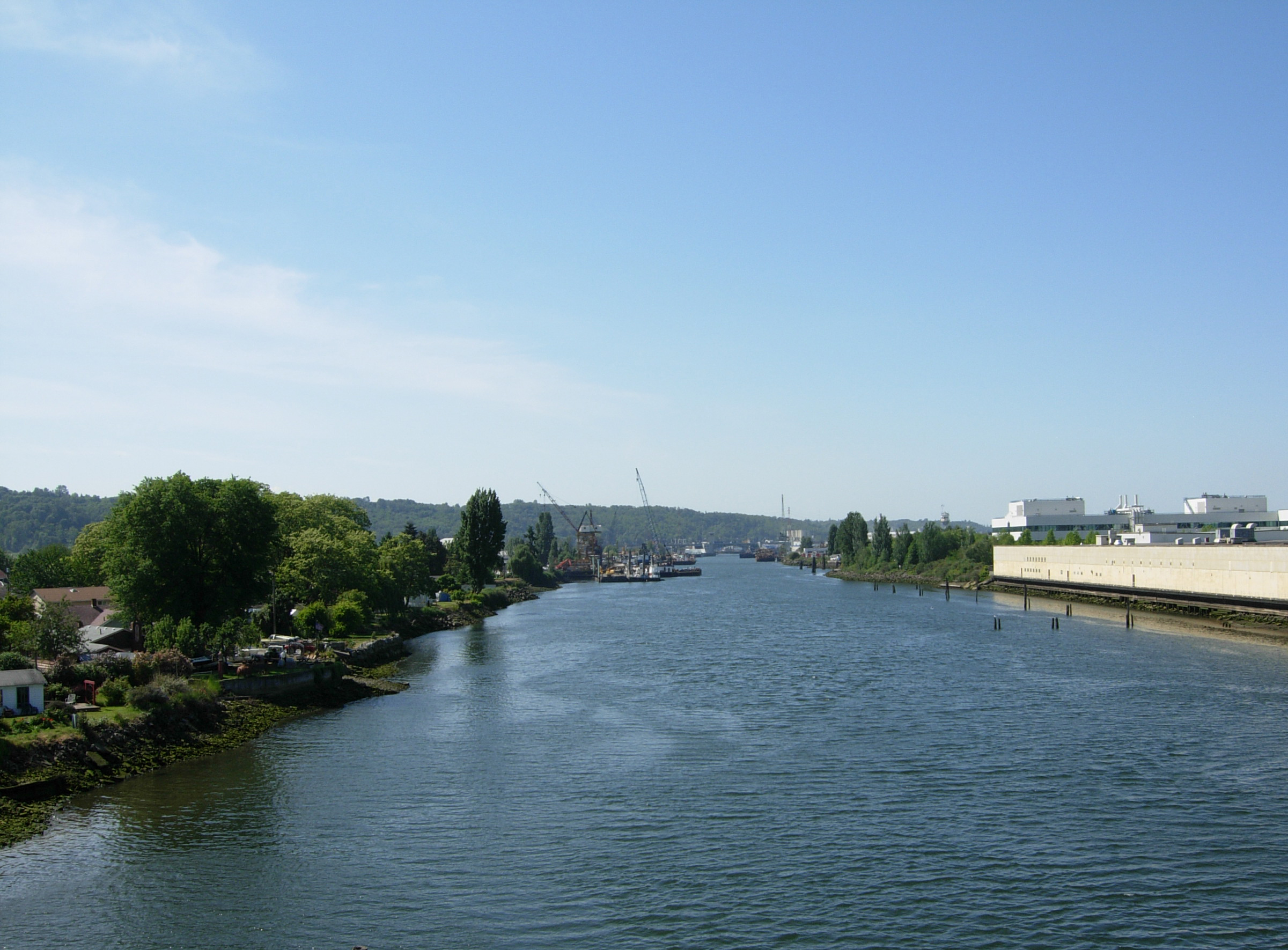
- Duwamish Waterway at South Park (2007). South Park is on the left. View from South Park Bridge.

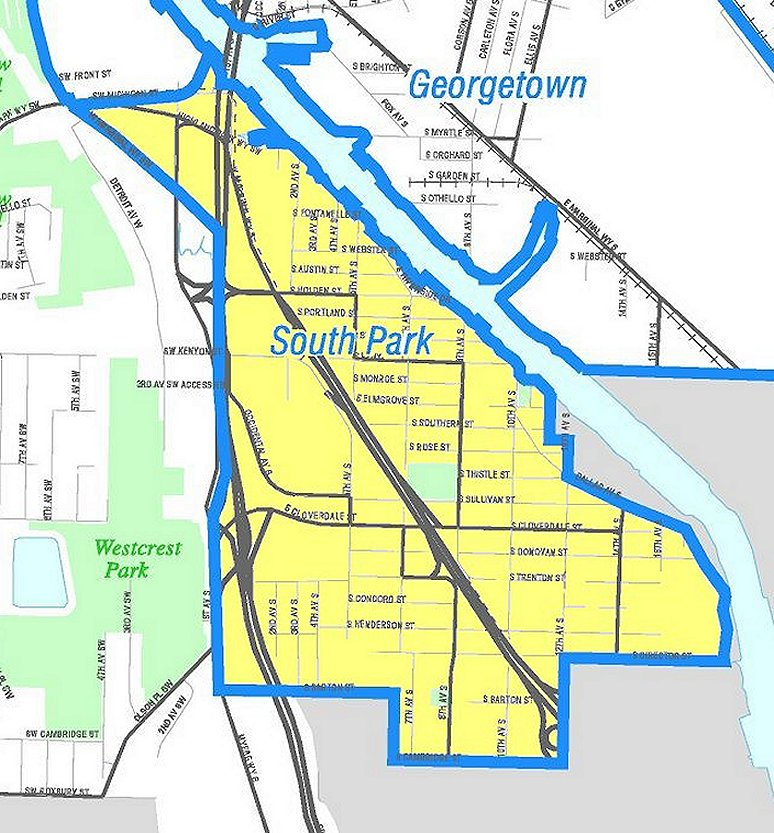
- South Park Map
- Coordinates: 47°31′49″N 122°19′26″W
- Country: United States
- State: Washington
- County: King
- City: Seattle
- ZIP Code: 98108
- Area code: 206, 564

South Park is a neighborhood in Seattle, Washington. It is located just south of Georgetown across the Duwamish River, and just north of the city of Tukwila. Its main thoroughfares are West Marginal Way S. (northwest- and southeast-bound), S. Cloverdale Street (east- and westbound) and 14th Ave. S (north-and-south). South Park connects to Georgetown by two bridges at 1st Ave S. at the northmost end of the neighborhood, and the South Park Bridge at the north end of 14th Ave. South.

Surrounded by Seattle's industrial area, South Park's soil and air have been polluted; heavy metals have contaminated the top soil and the nearby Duwamish River has been known for unhealthy levels of toxic chemicals. The property values are lower than elsewhere in Seattle, though some see growth potential in the area. The neighborhood is also home to a large Hispanic community with a population that of 4,154 that is roughly 47% Latino, thus giving it the highest concentration of Hispanic residents in the city.

== Former town ==
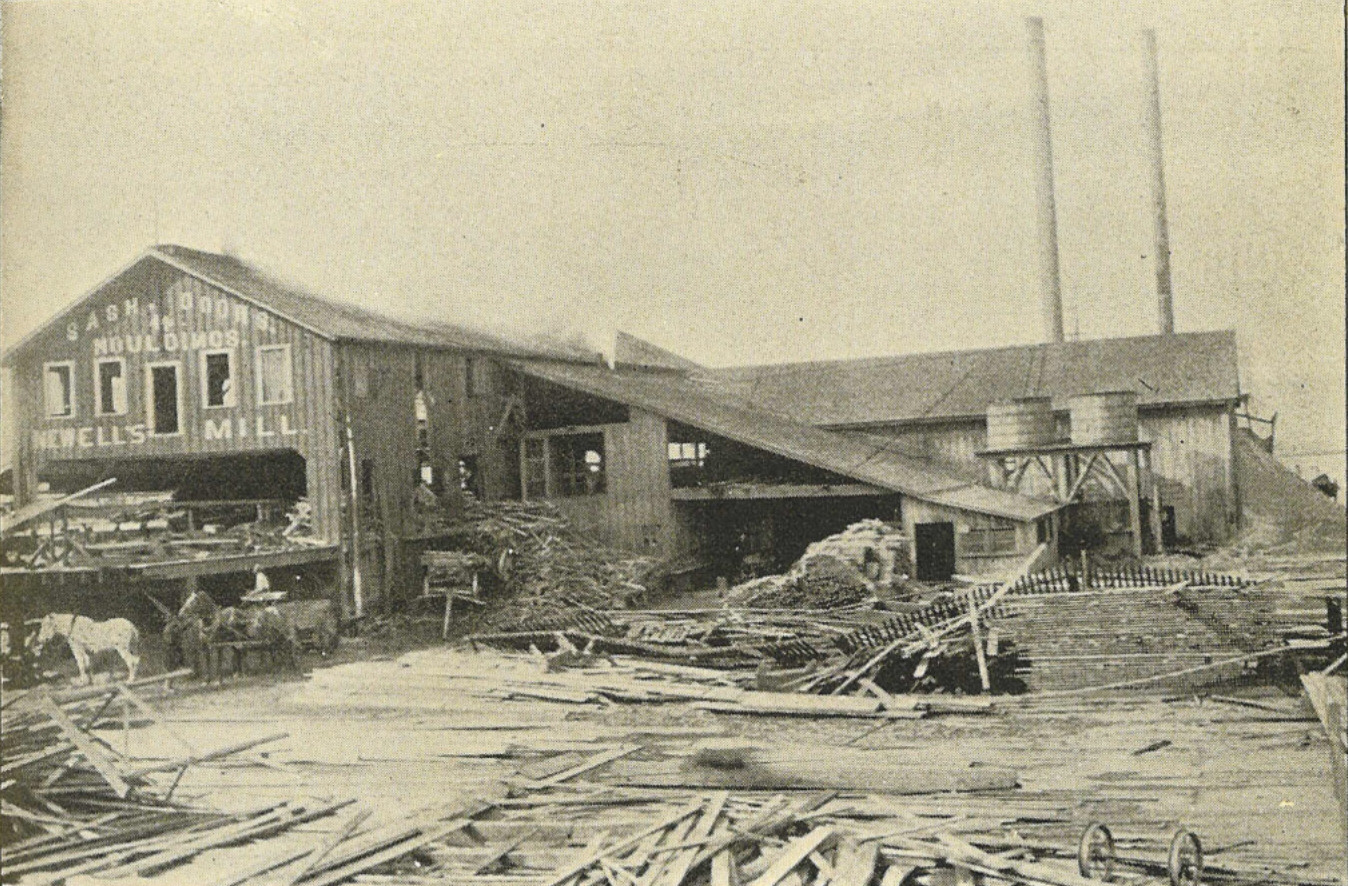
Newell Mill, South Park's leading business in 1900.

The Town of South Park was incorporated December 9, 1902 and the Town Council held its first meeting on December 23. South Park was served by three mayors in its four-and-one-half years of existence as an independent town: S. J. Bevan (1902–1903), G. C. Lingenfelter (1903–1905), and A. G. Breidenstein (1906–1907).

South Park was plagued by problems in securing adequate city services. Particularly vexing was the inability to obtain a decent water supply. Although the city of Georgetown owned water mains that ran through South Park, it refused to supply water to the latter, starting a bitter court battle over legal rights to the water. In 1905–1906, the town contracted with an independent water company, but in April 1906 the water was found to be contaminated because South Park did not have a sewer system. The Town Council petitioned Seattle to run Cedar River mains to the edge of the town and has had clean water since. The City of Seattle provides sewage services in modern South Park.

In October 1906, the electorate voted 131–59 for annexation to Seattle, but apparently no action was taken beyond the vote. On March 23, 1907, a second vote for annexation was 181–36 in favor and on May 3, 1907, South Park became part of the City of Seattle.

== Past and present bridges ==
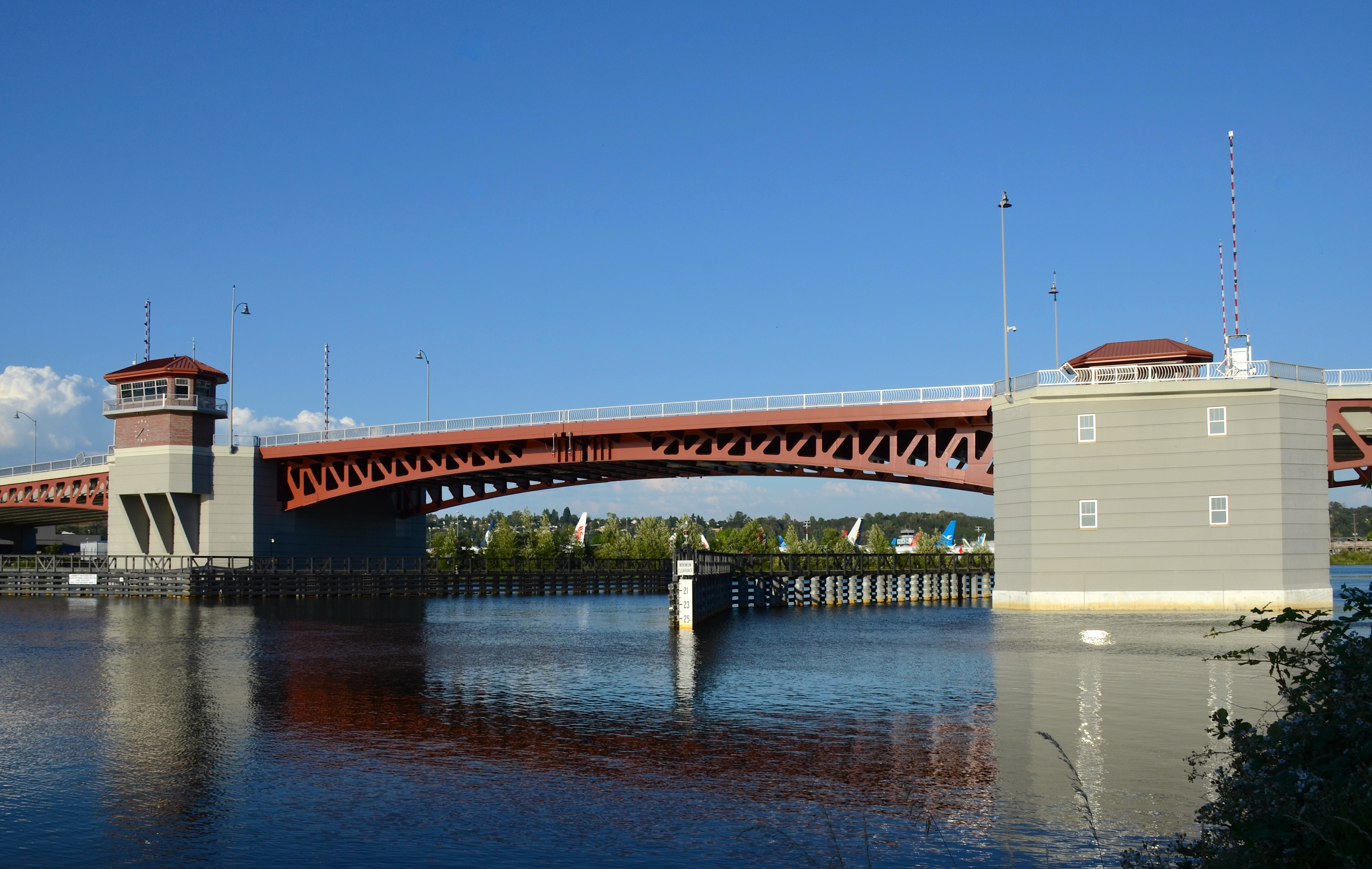
New South Park Bridge in 2022

Prior to the straightening of the Duwamish River for the Duwamish Waterway, South Park was connected to Georgetown by an electric railway that crossed a north–south bridge at 8th Avenue and by an east–west road bridge on County Road a few blocks northeast of that. A bend in the river resulted in the South Park side of that road bridge actually being the east end, with the Georgetown side on the west.

After the Duwamish was straightened, a new bridge was built at 8th Avenue (now 8th Avenue South), and operated from 1914 to 1937.

The present South Park Bridge is a double-leaf bascule bridge constructed in 2011–2014. It connects 16th Avenue S. in Georgetown to 14th Avenue S. in South Park. It replaced a bridge built in 1929–31 that had been listed on the National Register of Historic Places but was found to be in very poor condition by the 2000s. The new bridge opened to the public on June 30, 2014.

Just west of the bridge in South Park is a section of brick road that once led to an earlier bridge on more or less the same site. This brick road—one of the few remaining in Seattle—constitutes the northernmost portion of a road that once led from South Park to Des Moines, Washington; eight blocks south of the Duwamish, today's Des Moines Memorial Drive branches off of 14th Avenue S. leading uphill into unincorporated King County, the area commonly referred to as Boulevard Park.

== Park ==
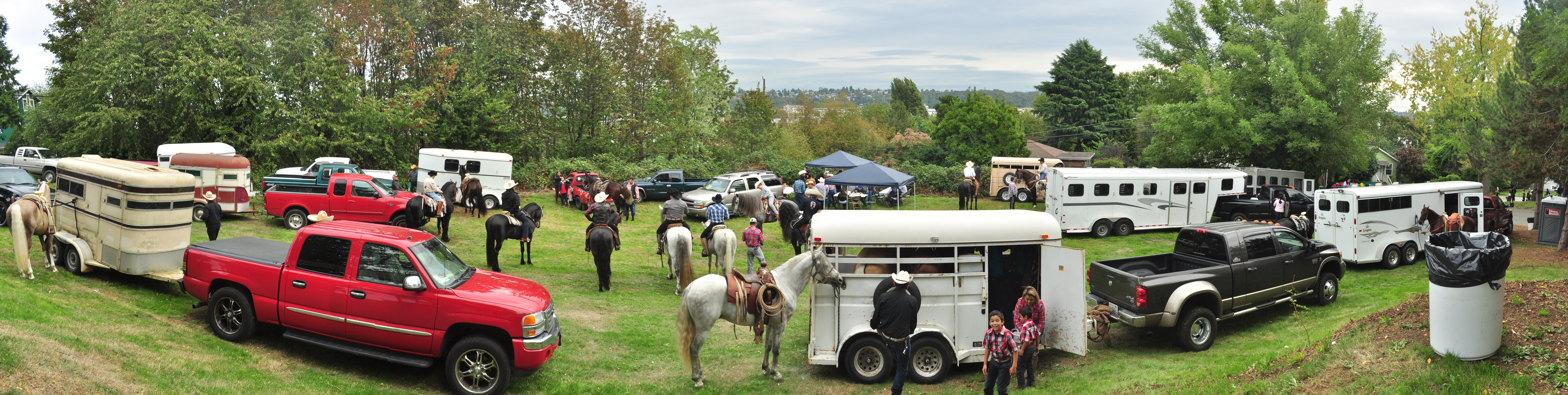
Preparing the horses for the Fiestas Patrias parade in South Park, 2015

Parque Libertad is a small community park at 700 South Cloverdale Street that is maintained by the Seattle Department of Parks and Recreation. It was originally an unused property owned the county that was transferred to the city and was constructed between 2007 and 2008, opening as César Chávez Park. The park was renamed in September 2026 following the removal of Chávez's name due to allegations of rape and sexual abuse.
