= Issaquah Sportsmen's Club =

- U.S. National Register of Historic Places
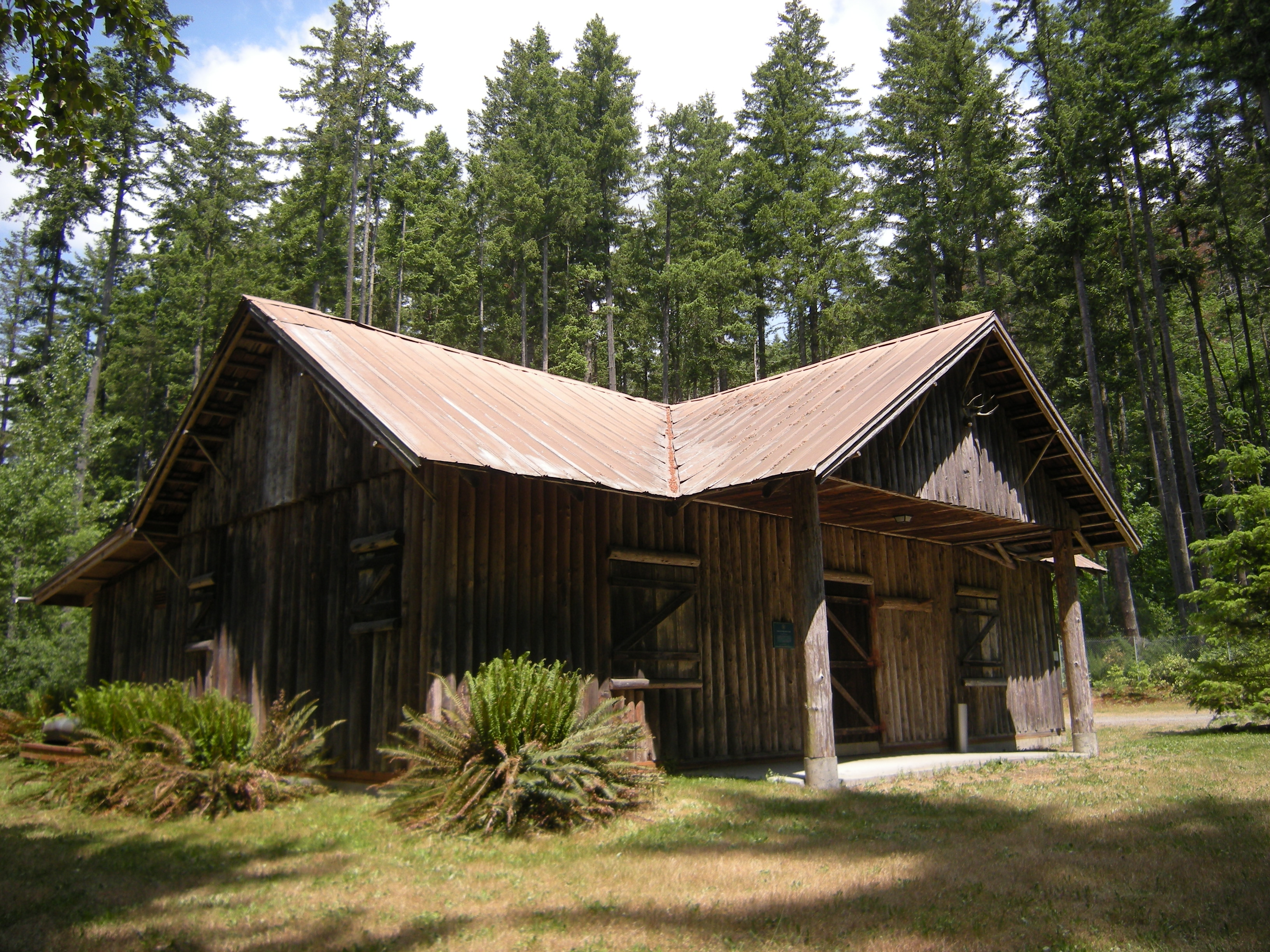
- Issaquah Sportsmen's Club in 2009

- Location within Washington (state) Location within the United States
- Location: 23600 SE Evans St., Issaquah, Washington
- Coordinates: 47°31′36″N 122°1′31″W
- Area: 1.8 acres (0.73 ha)
- Built: 1937
- Built by: Works Progress Administration
- Architectural style: WPA Rustic
- NRHP reference No.: 98001419
- Added to NRHP: 19 November 1998

The Issaquah Sportsmen's Club is a historic building in Issaquah, Washington.

== Description and history ==
The building's address is 23600 SE Evans Street. It was built in 1937 as part of the Works Progress Administration (WPA) with in the WPA Rustic architectural style. It is a one-story 40 by 32.3 feet (12.2 by 9.8 m) building constructed of vertical half logs about 8 inches (200 mm) wide. The building was moved from a similar wooded site to its current location in 1993. It was listed on the National Register of Historic Places on November 19, 1998.

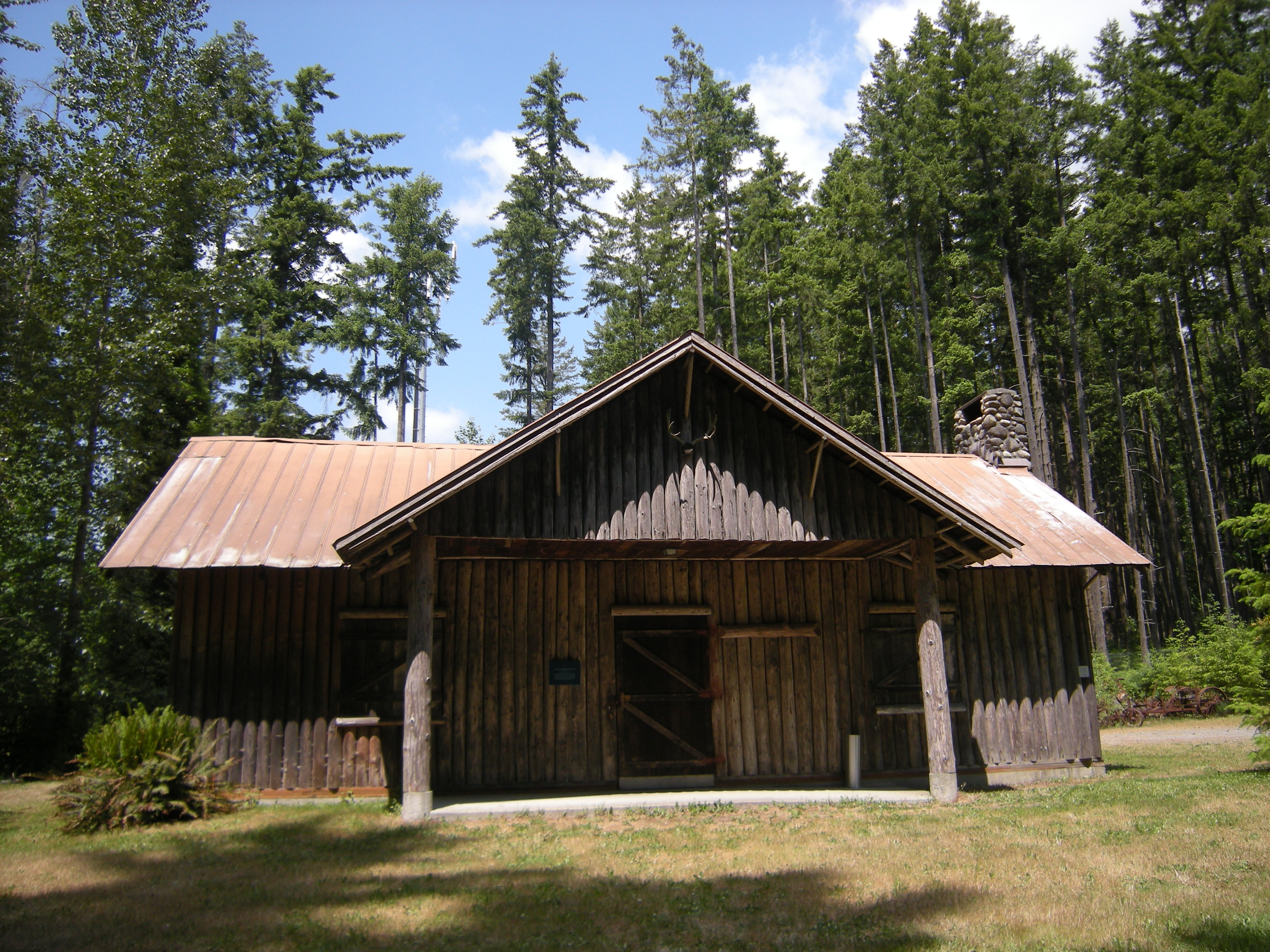
Facade (2009)

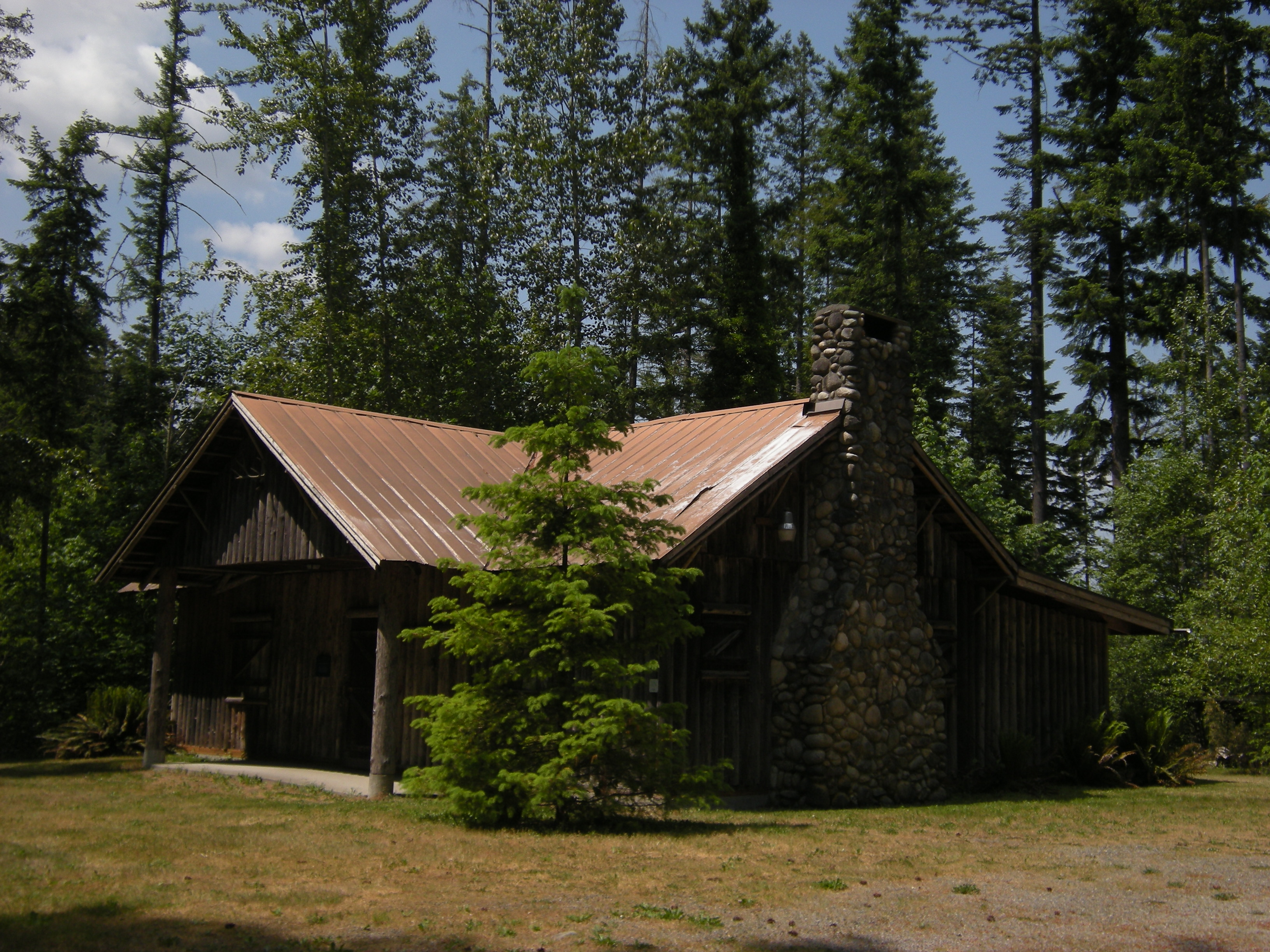
Facade and east elevation (2009)

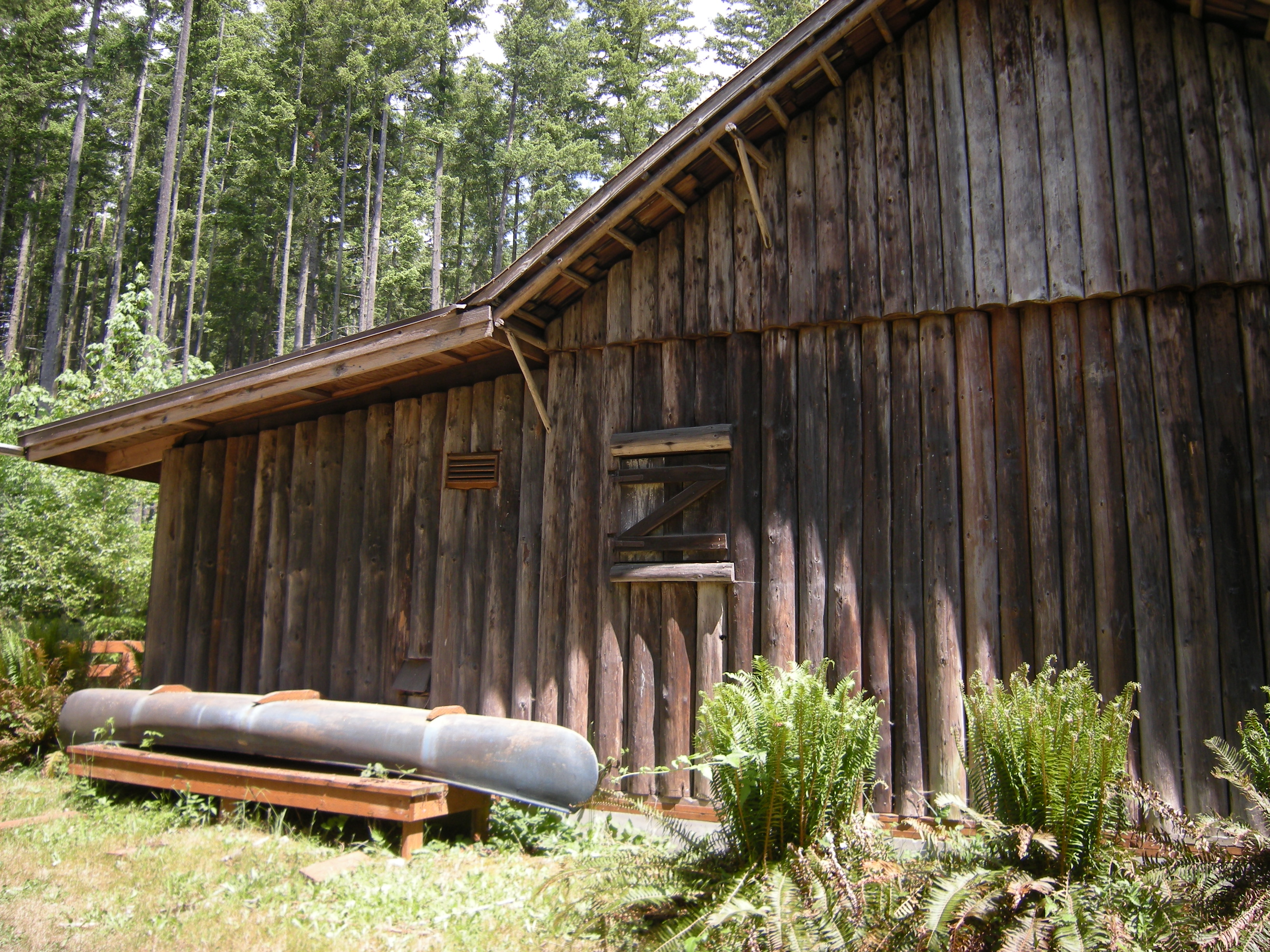
West elevation detail of rear section (2009)

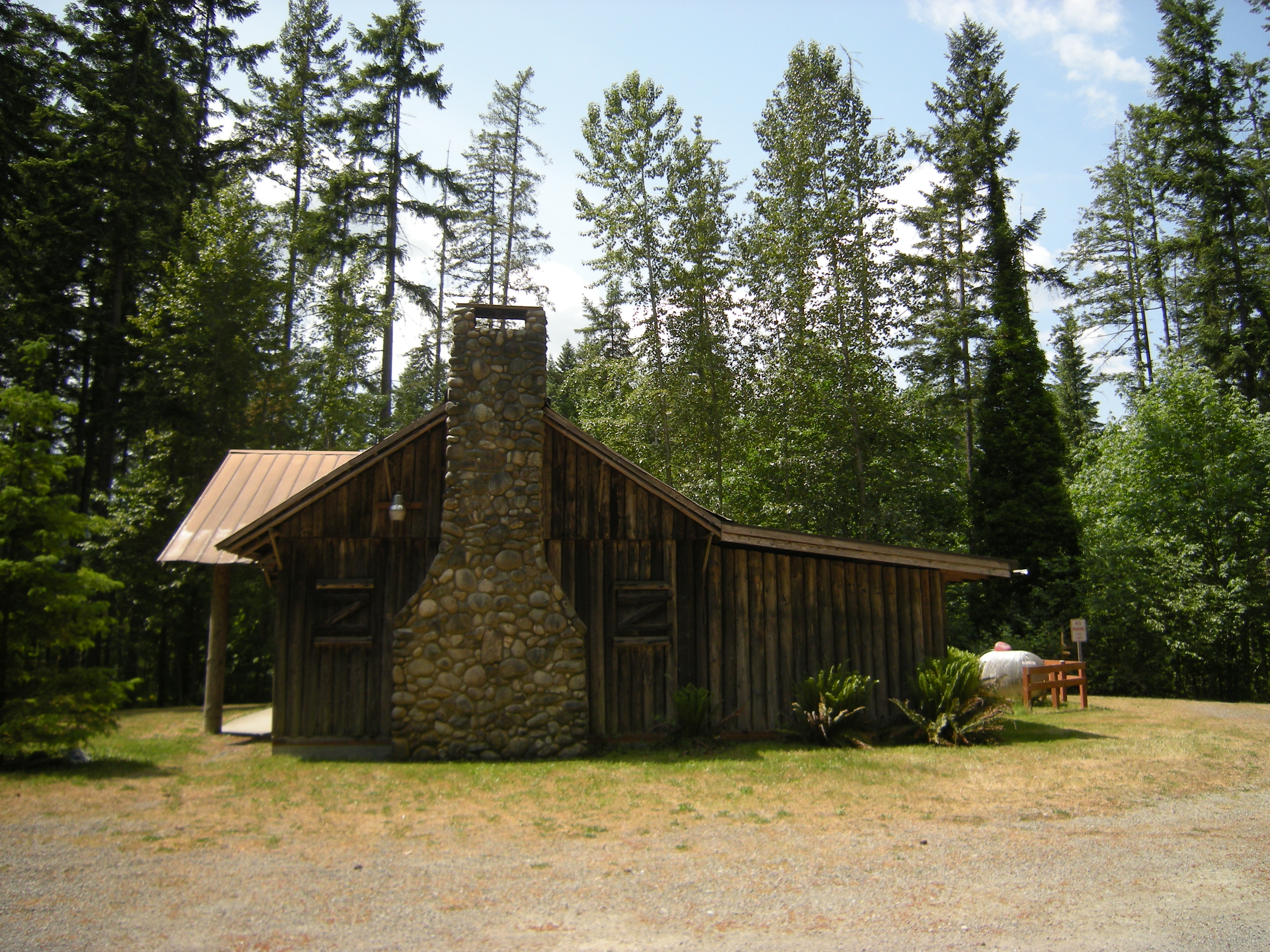
East elevation with stone chimney (2009)

== See also ==
- Historic preservation
- National Register of Historic Places listings in King County, Washington
- Social club
