= Baring, Washington =

- Census-designated place
- Location of Baring, Washington
- Coordinates: 47°45′58″N 121°28′49″W
- Country: United States
- State: Washington
- County: King

Area
  - Total: 1.13 sq mi (2.93 km^{2})
  - Land: 1.04 sq mi (2.70 km^{2})
  - Water: 0.093 sq mi (0.24 km^{2})
- Elevation: 774 ft (236 m)

Population (2020)
  - Total: 255
  - Density: 211/sq mi (81.6/km^{2})
- Time zone: UTC-8 (Pacific (PST))
  - Summer (DST): UTC-7 (PDT)
- ZIP Code: 98224
- Area code(s): 360, 564
- FIPS code: 53-04300
- GNIS feature ID: 2407797

Baring is an unincorporated community and census-designated place (CDP) in King County, Washington, United States. The population was 255 at the 2020 census, up from 220 at the 2010 census. It is located on U.S. Highway 2 about 23 miles (37 km) west of Stevens Pass, along a very flat and straight three-mile section of highway that has been dubbed the "Baring Straight" (a play on the Bering Strait between Alaska and Russia), since US-2 is otherwise hilly and curvy through the mountains. The settlement was first known as "Salmon", but by 1909 it was known as Baring.

== History ==
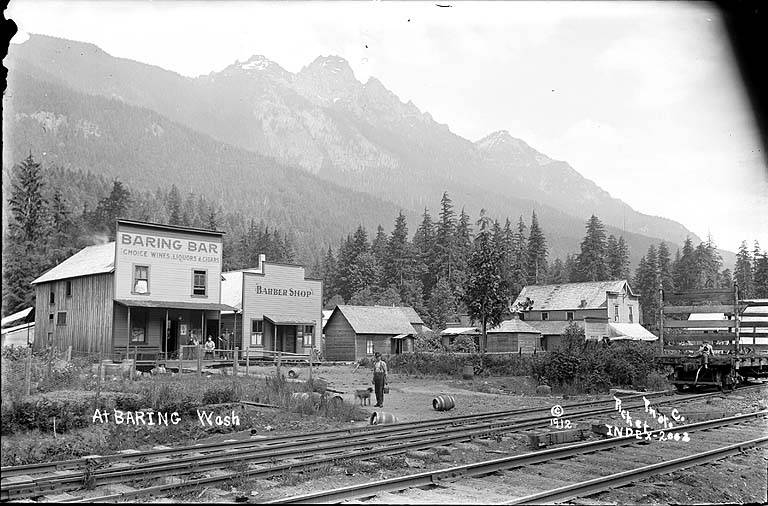
Baring in 1912

The towns in the Skykomish River valley were established based on the railway and the roads built to cross the Cascade Mountains at Stevens Pass. In the late 19th century during the expansion of the Great Northern Railway, the railway's chief locating engineer, John F. Stevens, surveyed the area and identified Stevens Pass as the ideal route for crossing the North Cascades. The first train passed through in June 1893. Early road development in the area included the Skykomish Tote Road, connecting towns along the rail line, which can be seen in photographs and maps from the late 19th and early 20th centuries.

In 1912, local citizens established a Good Roads Club to promote the construction of a cross-Cascades highway. By 1913, King, Chelan, and Snohomish counties collaborated on the Cascade Scenic Highway project (King County Road No. 999), which was surveyed the same year. However, completion of the highway was delayed due to World War I, funding, and construction obstacles. King County finished its 28-mile section by 1917, but the first automobiles did not cross until 1924, with the official opening taking place in July 1925.

The Cascade Scenic Highway and Stevens Pass Highway (now US 2) played a key role in the region's development by improving access and connectivity. The Stevens Pass Highway became State Road 15 in the 1930s, and was later realigned, paved, and renamed multiple times before ultimately becoming US 2 in the late 1940s.

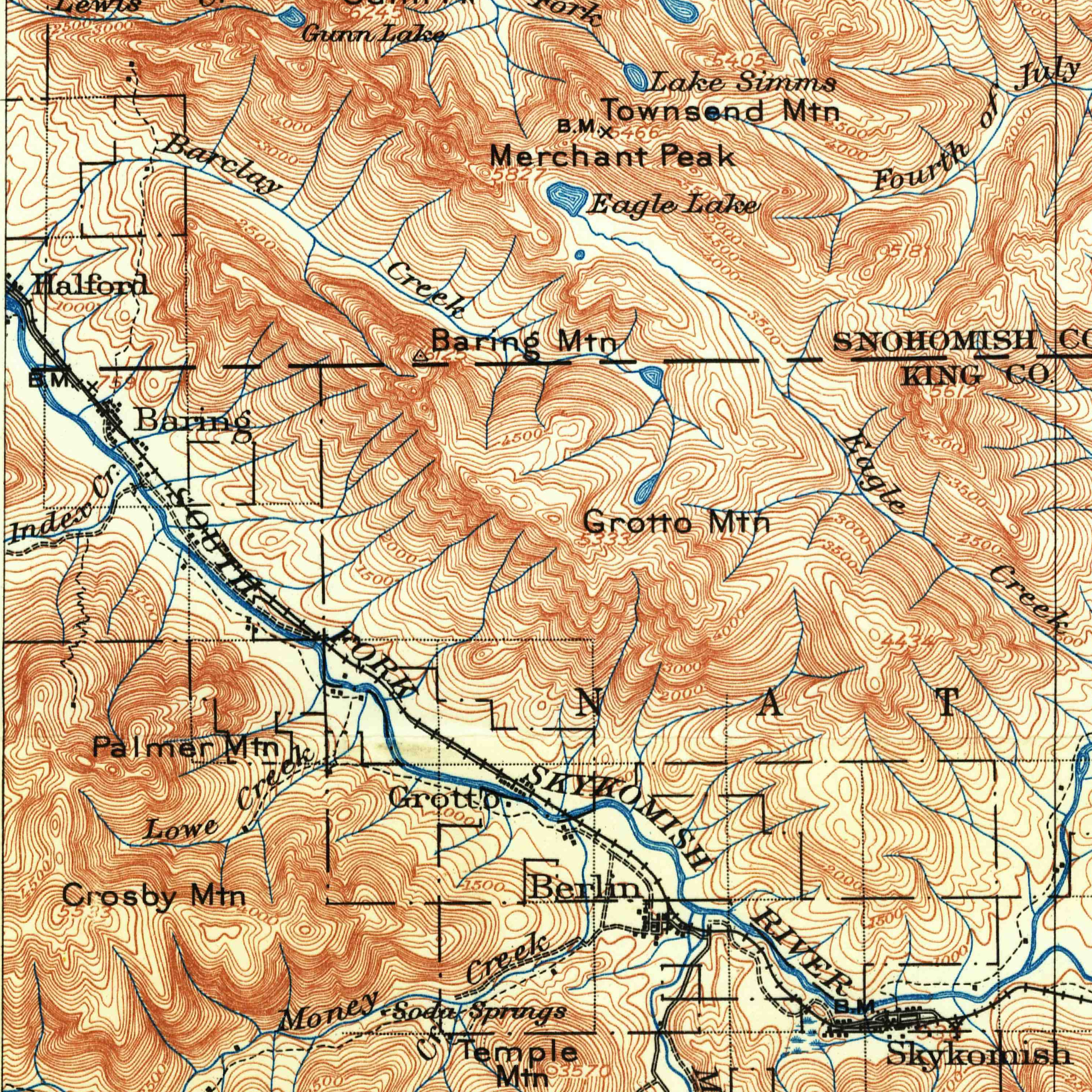
1902 US Geological Survey

== Geography ==
Baring is located in northeastern King County in the valley of the South Fork Skykomish River. US-2 leads southeast 7 miles (11 km) to Skykomish and northwest 41 miles (66 km) to Everett.

According to the United States Census Bureau, the Baring CDP has a total area of 1.1 square miles (2.9 km^{2}), of which 1.0 square mile (2.7 km^{2}) is land and 0.1 square miles (0.2 km^{2}), or 8.02%, is water.

== Demographics ==
Historical population
Census	Pop.	Note	%±
1910	140		—
1920	71		−49.3%
1930	111		56.3%
1940	105		−5.4%
1990	161		—
2000	233		44.7%
2010	220		−5.6%
2020	255		15.9%
U.S. Decennial Census; 1960 1970 1980 1990; 2000 2010

The community was listed as a census designated place in the 2000 U.S. census.

=== Racial and ethnic composition ===
Baring CDP, Washington – Racial and ethnic composition Note: the US Census treats Hispanic/Latino as an ethnic category. This table excludes Latinos from the racial categories and assigns them to a separate category. Hispanics/Latinos may be of any race.
Race / Ethnicity (NH = Non-Hispanic)	Pop 2000	Pop 2010	Pop 2020	% 2000	% 2010	% 2020
White alone (NH)	208	197	209	89.27%	89.55%	81.96%
Black or African American alone (NH)	0	0	2	0.00%	0.00%	0.78%
Native American or Alaska Native alone (NH)	6	4	2	2.58%	1.82%	0.78%
Asian alone (NH)	2	6	1	0.86%	2.73%	0.39%
Native Hawaiian or Pacific Islander alone (NH)	1	0	0	0.43%	0.00%	0.00%
Other race alone (NH)	0	0	0	0.00%	0.00%	0.00%
Mixed race or Multiracial (NH)	11	3	32	4.72%	1.36%	12.55%
Hispanic or Latino (any race)	5	10	9	2.15%	4.55%	3.53%
Total	233	220	255	100.00%	100.00%	100.00%

=== 2000 census ===
As of the 2000 United States census, there were 233 people, 105 households, and 59 families in the CDP. The population density was 139.0 people per square mile (53.5/km^{2}). There were 207 housing units at an average density of 123.5/sq mi (47.6/km^{2}). The racial makeup of the CDP was 90.56% White, 2.58% Native American, 0.86% Asian, 0.43% Pacific Islander, and 5.58% from two or more races. Hispanic or Latino of any race were 2.15% of the population.

There were 105 households, out of which 22.9% had children under the age of 18 living with them, 49.5% were married couples living together, 4.8% had a female householder with no husband present, and 43.8% were non-families. 32.4% of all households were made up of individuals, and 4.8% had someone living alone who was 65 years of age or older. The average household size was 2.22 and the average family size was 2.81.

The population contained 19.7% under the age of 18, 3.0% from 18 to 24, 37.8% from 25 to 44, 29.2% from 45 to 64, and 10.3% who were 65 years of age or older. The median age was 40 years. For every 100 females there were 121.9 males. For every 100 females age 18 and over, there were 122.6 males.

The median income for a household in the CDP was $40,875, and the median income for a family was $46,500. Males had a median income of $38,125 versus $32,292 for females. The per capita income for the CDP was $22,571. About 6.9% of families and 7.2% of the population were below the poverty line, including 5.4% of those under the age of eighteen and none of those 65 or over.

== Climate ==
According to the Köppen Climate Classification system, Baring has an Oceanic climate, abbreviated "Cfb" on climate maps.

Climate data for Baring (1991–2020 normals, extremes 1970–present)
Month	Jan	Feb	Mar	Apr	May	Jun	Jul	Aug	Sep	Oct	Nov	Dec	Year
Record high °F (°C)	61 (16)	73 (23)	80 (27)	91 (33)	100 (38)	107 (42)	101 (38)	98 (37)	98 (37)	86 (30)	70 (21)	60 (16)	107 (42)
Mean maximum °F (°C)	52.7 (11.5)	59.4 (15.2)	67.8 (19.9)	78.0 (25.6)	84.7 (29.3)	86.8 (30.4)	91.7 (33.2)	90.9 (32.7)	85.8 (29.9)	72.7 (22.6)	59.0 (15.0)	51.2 (10.7)	94.3 (34.6)
Mean daily maximum °F (°C)	41.9 (5.5)	46.6 (8.1)	51.6 (10.9)	58.5 (14.7)	66.0 (18.9)	69.4 (20.8)	76.7 (24.8)	77.1 (25.1)	70.9 (21.6)	58.3 (14.6)	47.4 (8.6)	40.8 (4.9)	58.8 (14.9)
Daily mean °F (°C)	36.7 (2.6)	39.2 (4.0)	42.8 (6.0)	48.2 (9.0)	55.0 (12.8)	58.8 (14.9)	64.4 (18.0)	64.7 (18.2)	59.5 (15.3)	49.9 (9.9)	41.6 (5.3)	36.2 (2.3)	49.8 (9.9)
Mean daily minimum °F (°C)	31.5 (−0.3)	31.8 (−0.1)	33.9 (1.1)	38.0 (3.3)	44.0 (6.7)	48.1 (8.9)	52.1 (11.2)	52.2 (11.2)	48.1 (8.9)	41.5 (5.3)	35.7 (2.1)	31.6 (−0.2)	40.7 (4.8)
Mean minimum °F (°C)	21.8 (−5.7)	23.3 (−4.8)	26.4 (−3.1)	30.9 (−0.6)	35.4 (1.9)	41.2 (5.1)	45.4 (7.4)	45.0 (7.2)	39.9 (4.4)	31.0 (−0.6)	25.3 (−3.7)	21.9 (−5.6)	16.3 (−8.7)
Record low °F (°C)	3 (−16)	6 (−14)	16 (−9)	27 (−3)	30 (−1)	31 (−1)	37 (3)	38 (3)	30 (−1)	23 (−5)	8 (−13)	3 (−16)	3 (−16)
Average precipitation inches (mm)	16.72 (425)	10.60 (269)	11.90 (302)	8.35 (212)	5.02 (128)	3.96 (101)	1.73 (44)	1.90 (48)	4.79 (122)	12.30 (312)	18.06 (459)	14.56 (370)	109.89 (2,791)
Average snowfall inches (cm)	13.8 (35)	4.6 (12)	3.8 (9.7)	0.8 (2.0)	0.0 (0.0)	0.0 (0.0)	0.0 (0.0)	0.0 (0.0)	0.0 (0.0)	0.1 (0.25)	4.2 (11)	17.0 (43)	44.3 (113)
Average precipitation days (≥ 0.01 in)	20.0	17.1	19.9	18.4	15.0	13.0	6.7	6.1	11.0	16.6	20.3	19.9	184.0
Average snowy days (≥ 0.1 in)	4.7	2.1	2.4	0.3	0.0	0.0	0.0	0.0	0.0	0.1	2.4	5.1	17.1
Source 1: NWS
Source 2: NOAA
