= Ballard High School (Seattle) =

Location
- 1418 Northwest 65th Street; Seattle, King County, Washington 98117; United States; 47°40′36″N 122°22′30″W

Information
- School type: Public, coeducational High School
- Motto: To honor thee we trophies bring
- Established: 1909, 117 years ago
- Status: Open
- School district: Seattle Public Schools
- Principal: Abigail Hunt
- Athletic Director: Eric Ensign
- Staff: 156
- Faculty: 90
- Teaching staff: 71.70 (FTE)
- Grades: 9-12
- Enrollment: 1,645 (2023-2024)
- Average class size: 25
- Student to teacher ratio: 22.94
- Campus: Urban
- Campus size: 12.71 acres (51,436 m²)
- Colors: Red & Black
- Fight song: "Cheer Cheer"
- Athletics: 18 varsity teams
- Athletics conference: Sea-King: Metro 3A
- Mascot: Bucky The Beaver
- Nickname: Beavers
- Rivals: Roosevelt High School Ingraham High School
- Newspaper: The Talisman
- Yearbook: The Shingle
- Budget: $9,012,087
- Communities served: Ballard, Queen Anne, Magnolia, Greenwood, Crown Hill, Phinney Ridge, Fremont, Interbay
- Feeder schools: Catharine Blaine K-8, Hamilton Int'l Middle School, McClure Middle School, Salmon Bay K-8, Whitman Middle School, Robert Eagle Staff Middle School
- Website: Ballard H.S.
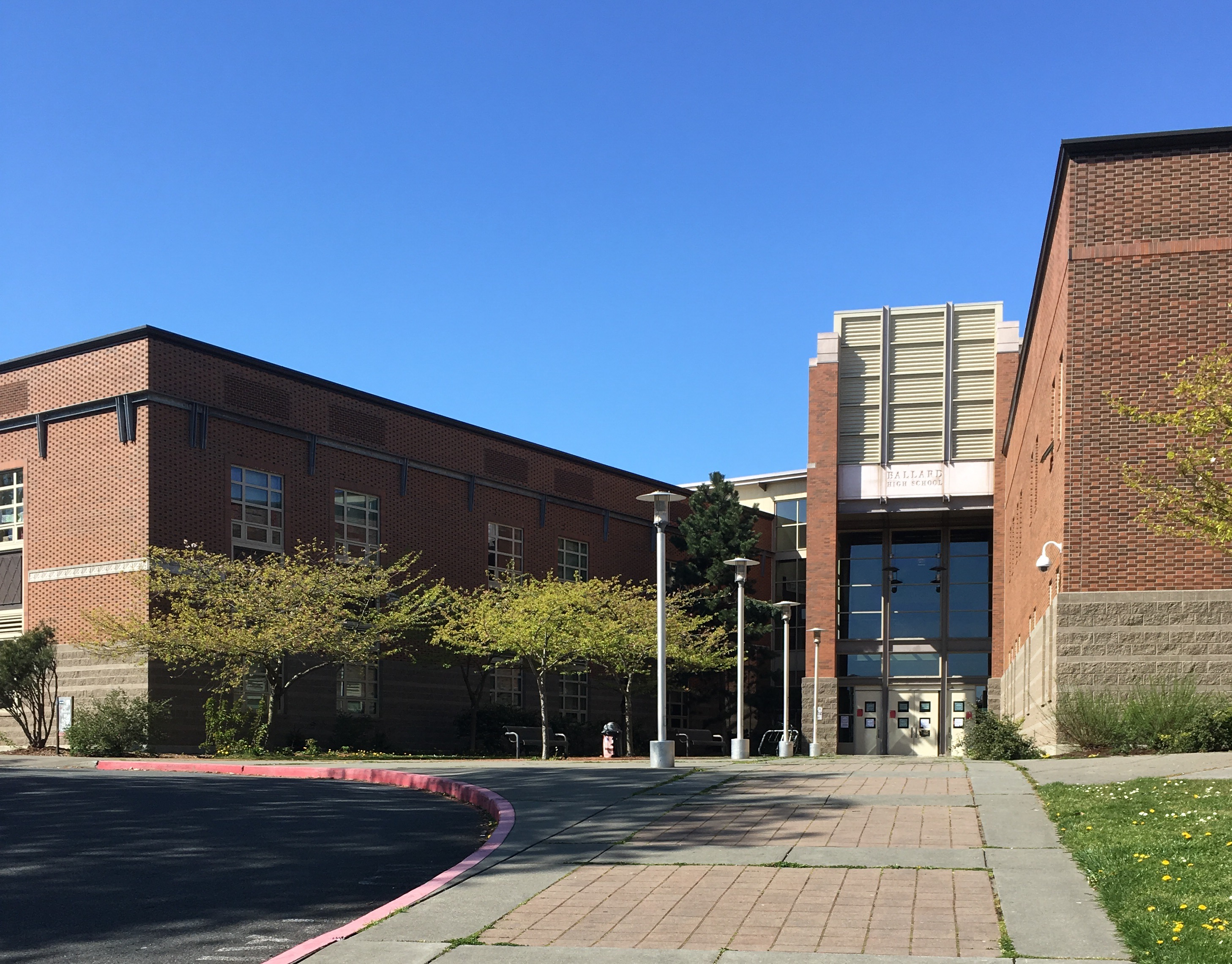
- Main entrance

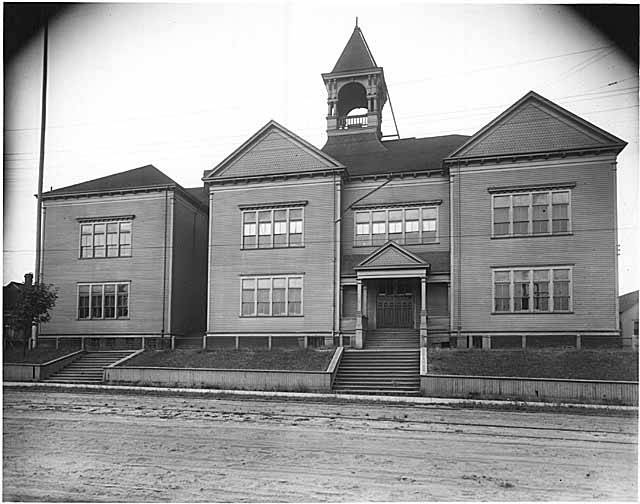
Ballard High School was founded in this long-gone building on Tallman Avenue, in 1901.

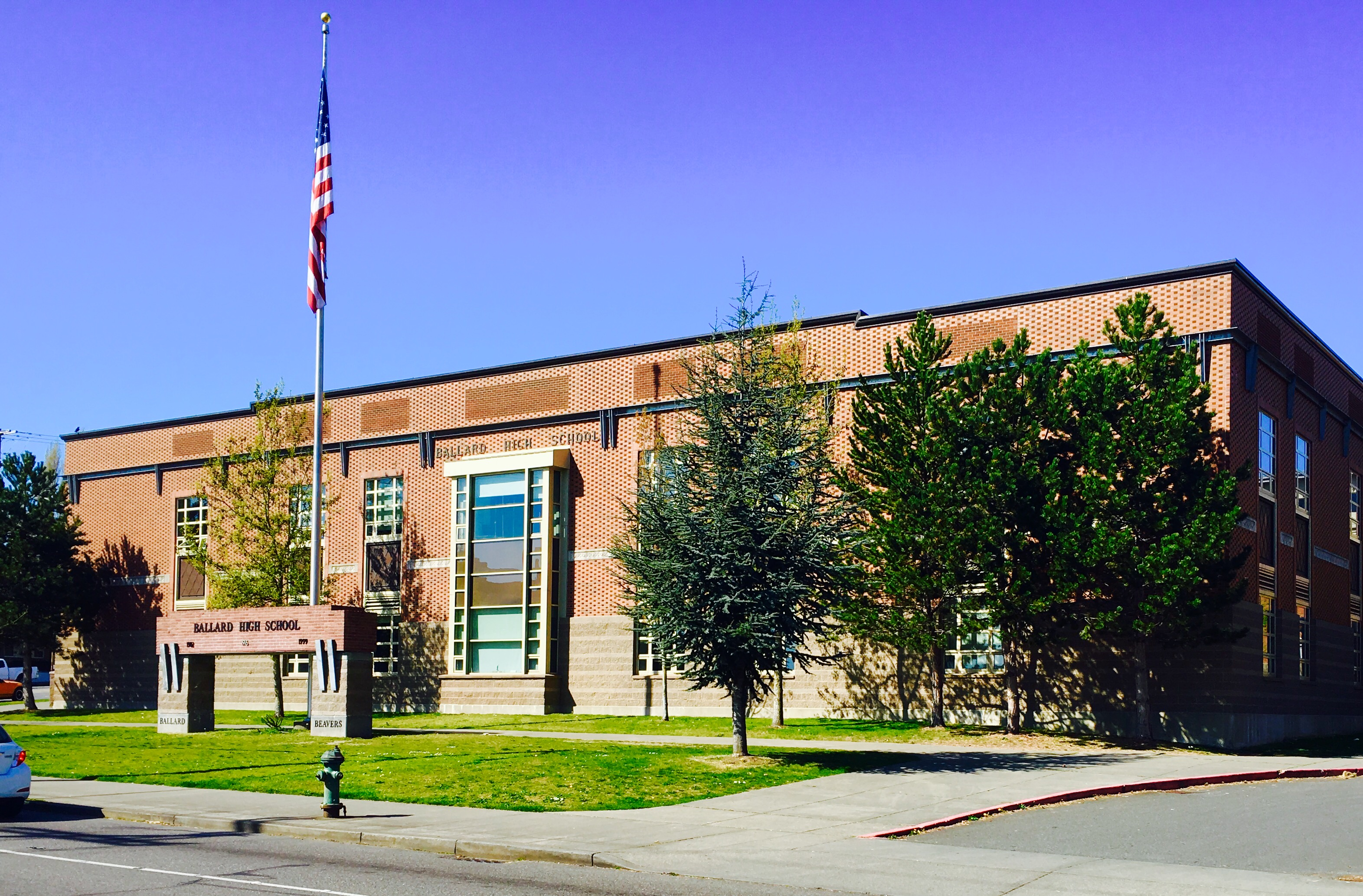
Main south facade

Ballard High School (BHS) is a high school in Seattle, Washington, located in the Ballard neighborhood.

== History ==
The first 9-12 school in Ballard was part of the Central School, and operated under the Ballard School District. A few years after the neighborhood of Ballard was annexed into the city of Seattle, Seattle Public Schools renamed the high school portion of the school, and it opened as Ballard High School on September 7, 1909. In January 1916, Ballard High School was given their own campus, which the historic school still occupies today.

== Background ==
Prior to the Seattle Public School's construction, high schoolers in Ballard used a building that opened in the fall of 1901, when the Ballard School District added grades eleven and twelve to the already existing Central School, creating the first four-year high school in the Ballard area. The very small school was located at 5308 Tallman Avenue. There were three people on the faculty, including the principal, Harry F. Giles. The first graduating class had four students and held its commencement on June 23, 1902.

By 1905, enrollment had grown to 80 students. Ballard became part of the city of Seattle in 1907, and the Central School high school became part of the Seattle Public School System.

In 1909 Ballard High School was given its name, and then moved to its present location during Christmas vacation 1915. The school could accommodate 1,000 students. Three hundred of them were transferred from Lincoln.

The building was remodeled three times, once in 1925, then again in 1941, and for the last time in 1959. At that time, the student body had grown to over 2,000.

That structure was demolished in the summer of 1997 due to asbestos contamination, and was replaced with the current facility. The student body was housed in the old Lincoln High School building during the 1997–98 and 1998-99 school years. Lincoln was undergoing a remodel to become a middle school. The students who attended Ballard at Lincoln High had no bells to mark classes, limited classrooms, and cubically separated classrooms in the library and gymnasium facilities for the 1997–98 school year. This was due to the fact that half of the facility at Lincoln was still closed for renovations (the half that held the majority of the divided classrooms). Finally in September 1999, Ballard High School returned to 1418 NW 65th Street to occupy a new building with the ability to accommodate evolving technology and more than 1,500 students. There are several classrooms that do not have windows.

=== 1994 shooting ===
The first murder ever of a student on Seattle School District property happened in 1994 outside Ballard High School. Then 16-year-old Brian Ronquillo, a student at Shorewood High School, fired a gun eight times into a group of students as a car he was in drove past Ballard High School. Melissa Fernandes, a 16-year-old Ballard student, was shot and killed, although she was not the intended target, a 16-year-old male student was also injured. Ronquillo was sentenced to 51 years in prison for the gang-related shooting and then 19-year old Cesar Sarausad who was the car driver was sentenced to more than 27 years in prison.

== Academic programs ==
=== Academies ===
Ballard High maintains two formal academies on campus: The Academy of Finance, and the Maritime Academy. Both comprise an integrated curriculum across content areas. Students enrolled in these academies are part of the Ballard student population but have chosen to participate in a specific content area of focus.

Ballard High School formerly maintained the Biotech Academy in addition to the above academies, however it has since been replaced by Biotech Pathway, consisting of a Biotech Biology course open to freshman and alternating Systems Medicine and Physiology courses open to juniors and seniors.

=== Performing Arts ===
Ballard Performing Arts (BPA) is Ballard High's music and theatre department, offering programs in band, choir, orchestra, and theatre. The program is sponsored by the Ballard Performing Arts Booster Club (BPAB) which is run by parents and BHS staff involved in the program.

Ballard offers various types of music programs for students. Concert band students are divided into three groups by skill and combine to participate in the joint extracurricular marching and pep band alongside a separate percussion ensemble. Three levels of jazz band are also offered to students independent of concert band. Choir and orchestra students are also organized in concert and chamber groups with separate jazz choir and fiddle ensemble groups. Theatre programs are offered as classes and as organized extracurricular activities. In addition to performing arts programs, elective classes such as AP Music Theory and Piano Lab are also offered for students.

BPA programs have been known regionally for excellent skill and performance. In addition to the many local performances and competitions students participate in, Ballard's Jazz Band has participated in the Essentially Ellington Jazz Festival, and concert band, orchestra, and choir groups have participated in national festivals including performances at Carnegie Hall. Despite being enrolled in BPA programs as typical classes, performing arts students are often expected to be available outside of typical school hours or during class time for various performances.

=== FIRST Robotics Competition ===
Ballard High School hosts Viking Robotics, a FIRST Robotics Competition team, assigned team number 2928. Viking Robotics provides a place for students to learn and apply skills in STEM fields to a cooperative/competitive championship.

In 2017, Viking Robotics

- Was a finalist in the Mount Vernon district event
- Won the Glacier Peak district event
- Won the Pacific Northwest district championship
- Won the Roebling division on the Houston championship
- Won the Houston world championship

=== Notable alumni ===
- Thomas Alberg – venture capitalist
- Josh Barnett – former UFC Heavyweight champion and current mixed martial artist
- Don Bies – former PGA Tour player
- Arnold L. Bjorklund – World War II officer
- Handwalla Bwana – Kenyan footballer (Nashville SC)
- John O. Creighton – former NASA astronaut
- Silme Domingo – UW Honors Grad, Labor Activist, Assassinated in 1981 at Pioneer Square office of ILWU Local 37 by corrupt union members on orders from Philippine President Marcos.
- Paul Enquist – 1984 men's double scull Olympic gold medal winner (double partner Brad Alan Lewis)
- Richard Gilkey – painter (did not graduate)
- Halvor Hagen – former NFL player
- Art Hansen – painter and lithographer
- George Irvine – former ABA player (Virginia)
- Chet Johnson – former MLB player (St. Louis Browns)
- Earl Johnson – former MLB player (Boston Red Sox, Detroit Tigers)
- Matthew Law – actor, filmmaker
- Thomas McAdams – Master Chief Boatswain's Mate, U.S. Coast Guard
- Dori Monson – KIRO and Seahawk radio announcer
- Jean Smart – actress
- Karsten Solheim – founder of PING golf club company
