= Jason Chorak =

American football player (born 1974)

No. 93, 76, 72, 97
- Position: Linebacker

Personal information
- Born: September 23, 1974 (age 52); Vashon, Washington, U.S.
- Listed height: 6 ft 4 in (1.93 m)
- Listed weight: 256 lb (116 kg)

Career information
- High school: Vashon
- College: Washington
- NFL draft: 1998: 7th round, 236th overall pick

Career history
- St. Louis Rams (1998)*; Indianapolis Colts (1998); Denver Broncos (2000)*; San Diego Chargers (2000)*; Chicago Enforcers (2001)
- * Offseason or practice squad member only

Awards and highlights
- First-team All-American (1996); Pac-10 Defensive Player of the Year (1996); 2× First-team All-Pac-10 (1996, 1997)

Career NFL statistics
- Tackles: 3
- Sacks: 1
- Stats at Pro Football Reference

Jason Chorak (born September 23, 1974) is an American former professional football player who was a linebacker in the National Football League (NFL). He played college football for the Washington Huskies, earning first-team All-American honors in 1996. He was selected in the seventh round of the 1998 NFL draft.

== College career ==
In 1996, he won the Washington Huskies' season award for the defensive L. Wait Rising Lineman Of Year, Pacific-10 Conference's Defensive Player of the Year and College Football All-America Team (by The Sporting News and Football News).

In 1996, he led the team with a single season record of 14.5 sacks and finished his career with 25.5 sacks (a career record that would hold up until 2009).

== Professional career ==
He was selected in the 1998 NFL draft by the St. Louis Rams in the seventh round (236th overall) with a compensatory pick. In 1998, he played for the Indianapolis Colts, contributing 1 sack and 3 tackles in 8 games. He also played for the XFL's Chicago Enforcers.

== Personal life ==
Chorak is of Croat origin. His parents are Croatian immigrants.

== See also ==
- Washington Huskies football statistical leaders
