= Sawbones =

Sawbones may refer to:

- Sawbones, slang for a surgeon
- Sawbones, an artificial bone developed by Pacific Research Laboratories
- Sawbones (podcast), a 2013 podcast distributed by Maximum Fun
- Sawbones (film), a 1995 American film

== See also ==
- Bonesaw
