= Magnolia Beach =

Magnolia Beach may refer to:

- Magnolia Beach, Texas, an unincorporated community in Calhoun County, Texas, United States
- Magnolia Beach, Washington, an unincorporated community in King County, Washington, United States
