= Vashon Municipal Airport =

- IATA: none; ICAO: none; FAA LID: 2S1

Summary
- Airport type: Public
- Owner/Operator: King County Airport District #1
- Location: Vashon Island, Washington, USA
- Elevation AMSL: 316 ft / 96 m
- Coordinates: 47°27′31″N 122°28′27″W
- Interactive map of Vashon Municipal Airport

Runways
Direction	Length		Surface
Direction	ft	m	Surface
17/35	2,001	610	Turf

Helipads
Number	Length		Surface
Number	ft	m	Surface
H1	98	30	Turf

Statistics (2022)
- Aircraft operations: 2,000
- Based aircraft: 28
- Sources: FAA, WSDOT

Vashon Municipal Airport is a municipal airport on Vashon Island in King County, Washington, United States. The airport is one of the few public airports in Washington State with only a grass runway.

== Facilities and aircraft ==
Vashon Municipal Airport covers an area of 20 acres (8.1 ha) at an elevation of 316 feet (96 m) above mean sea level. It has one runway and one helipad, both with turf surfaces: 17/35 is 2,001 by 60 feet (610 m × 18 m) and H1 is 98 by 98 feet (30 m × 30 m). The airport contains a sculpture commemorating a 1968 UFO sighting.

For the 12-month period ending December 31, 2022, the airport had 2,000 aircraft operations, an average of 38 per week: all general aviation. At that time there were 28 aircraft based at this airport: all single-engine.

== Commercial air service ==
Vashon Island Air provides FAA Part 135 Air Charter Service on the island.

== See also ==
- List of airports in Washington
