= Vashon Island High School =

Coordinates: 47°25′24″N 122°27′29″W

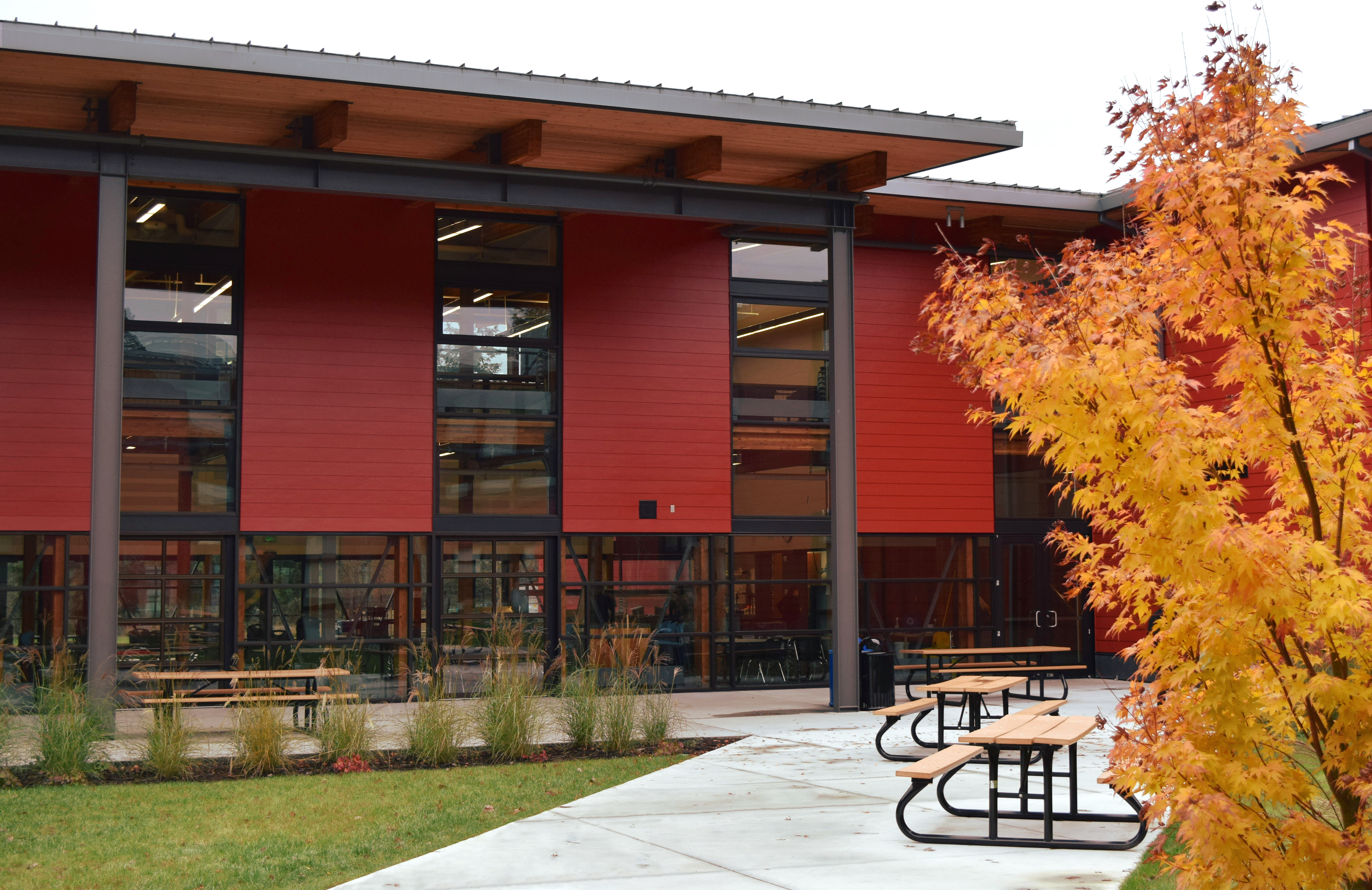
- Vashon Island High School's main building.
- 20120 Vashon Hwy SW; Vashon Island, Washington 98070; United States

Information
- Type: Public Secondary School
- Established: 1912
- School district: Vashon Island School District
- Principal: John Erickson
- Faculty: 24.10 (on an FTE basis)
- Grades: 9-12
- Enrollment: 509 (2022–2023)
- Student to teacher ratio: 21.12
- Campus type: Suburban, Co-Educational
- Color
- Athletics conference: WIAA West Central District 3
- Mascot: Pirate
- Newspaper: The Riptide (formerly The Clam) ((formerly the Tiger))
- Website: vhs.vashonsd.org

Vashon Island High School (VHS) is a public high school located on Vashon Island, Washington. Vashon Island High School, a part of the Vashon Island School District, is the only high school to serve the island.

VHS runs 9th through 12th grade. VHS puts on three plays a year within the three drama classes: Theater Arts I, Theater Arts II, and Musical Theater. VHS also has a band which puts on three concerts, including a Christmas concert and a pops concert. The band also competes at a band competition at Stadium High School. The school's athletic mascot is the Pirates.

== Campus ==
In 2018, some of the restroom facilities were to be converted into gender-neutral ones.

Despite being accessible only by ferries, VHS has a large number of off-island commuter students who come from West Seattle, the Kitsap Peninsula (predominantly from Port Orchard), and Tacoma.

== Awards and recognition ==
In 2024 Vashon Island High School was named the 10th best high school in Washington State by US News rankings.

Vashon Island High School was a 2013 Washington Achievement Award winner for Overall Excellence and High Improvement.

The school was named a national Blue Ribbon School in 2008.

== Sports ==
Vashon Island's sports teams compete in the Nisqually League of WIAA's West Central District.

- Debate (Lincoln-Douglas and Policy)
- Soccer (Boys and Girls)
- Baseball
- Softball
- Boys' football
- Basketball (Boys and Girls)
- Track
- Cross-Country (Boys and Girls)
- Wrestling (Boys and Girls)
- Golf
- Volleyball
- Tennis
- Co-Ed Cheerleading

== Notable alumni ==
- Mary Matsuda Gruenewald — memoirist
- Jason Chorak — Washington Huskies football player, 1996 Pac 10 Defensive Player of the Year and All American
