= Colvos Store =

- U.S. National Register of Historic Places
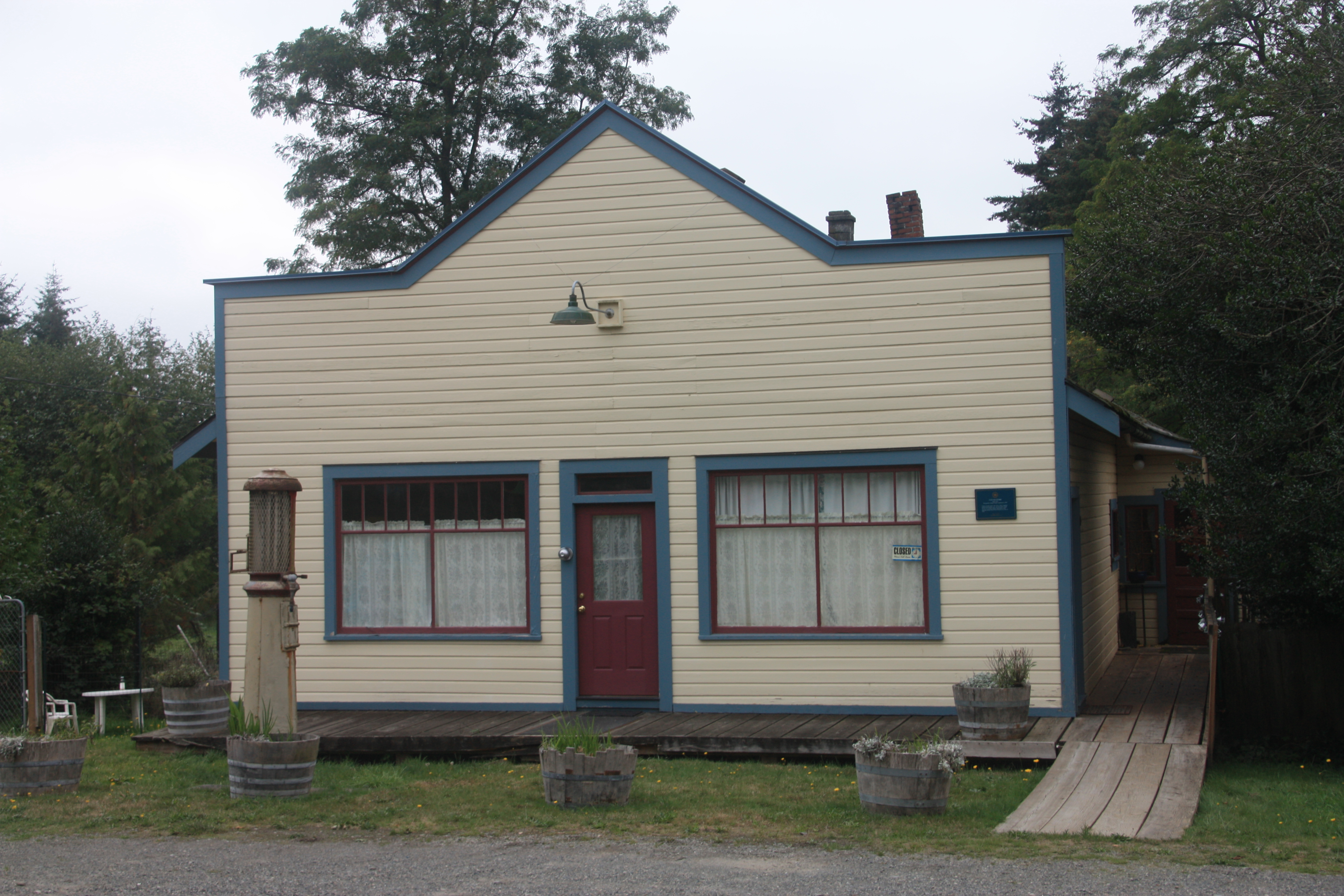
- Colvos Store

- Location within Washington (state) Location within the United States
- Location: 123rd Ave. SW and Cove Rd., Vashon, Washington
- Coordinates: 47°27′55″N 122°29′29″W
- Area: less than one acre
- Built: 1923
- Architect: Trones, John; Parker, Gustav
- Architectural style: Early Commercial
- NRHP reference No.: 00000970
- Added to NRHP: August 10, 2000

The Colvos Store, also known as the Kress Store and Belcher Home, is a combination residence and commercial building in Vashon, Washington. It was added to the National Register of Historic Places on August 10, 2000.

== History ==
The Colvos Store was built in 1923 by John Trones, an immigrant from Norway, and Gustav Parker. The store area in the front measured about 30 feet (9.1 m) by 30 feet (9.1 m), and a two-room apartment behind the store measured about 30 feet (9.1 m) by 25 feet (7.6 m). A garage (since demolished) and addition to the rear apartment were added in the 1930s.

Trones, having bought out Parker's interest in the store, operated it himself for several years before selling it to the Tellvik family in 1927. Mr. Tellvik added the garage which operated in conjunction with a Shell Oil Company gas pump. The store passed to several families in the 1930s: from the Tellviks to the Townes to the Sextons. In 1938, Mr. and Mrs. Guy Kress bought and renamed the store "Kress Store", operating it until 1943 when war rationing and declining business led the Kresses to close the store.

After falling into disrepair, the building was rehabilitated as a residence and studio in 1985, restoring the facade to its original appearance. In 1994, it was discovered that the original 700 gallon gasoline storage tank was still underground; it was removed and remediation actions were taken to remove contaminants from the soil.
