= Vashon Island School District =

School district in Washington, United States

Vashon Island School District is a school district headquartered in Vashon Island, Washington.

== Schools ==
- Chautauqua Elementary School
- McMurray Middle School
- Vashon Island High School
- Family Link
