= Vashon Hardware Store =

Historical commercial building in Vashon, Washington

- U.S. National Register of Historic Places
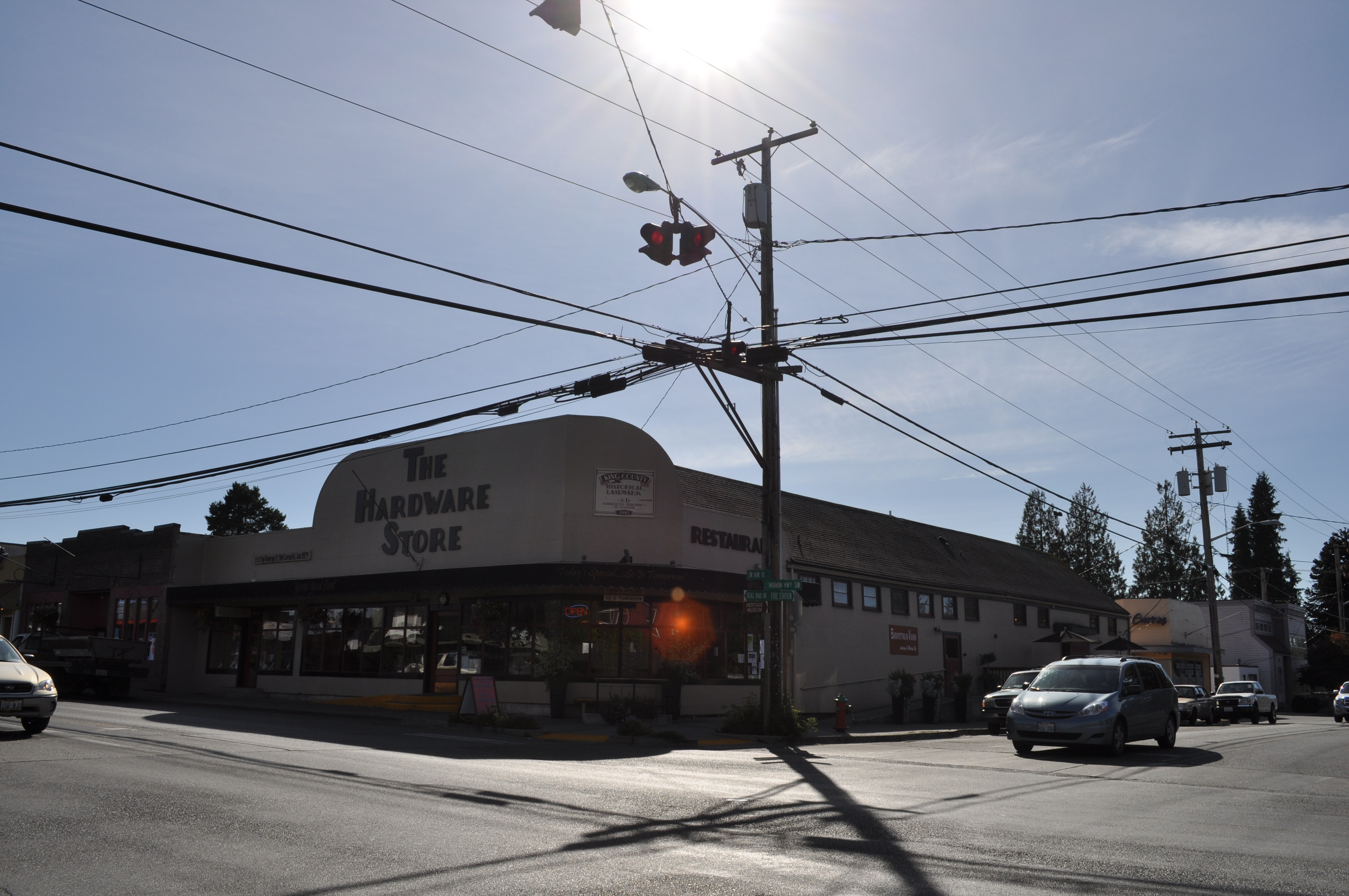
- Vashon Hardware Store

- Location within Washington (state) Location within the United States
- Location: 17601 99th Ave. SW, Vashon, Washington
- Coordinates: 47°26′50″N 122°27′34″W
- Area: less than one acre
- Built: 1890
- Built by: Gorsuch, F.C.; Harrington, A.C.
- Architectural style: Early Commercial, Moderne
- NRHP reference No.: 00000971
- Added to NRHP: August 10, 2000

Vashon Hardware Store, now known as The Hardware Store Restaurant, is a commercial building in Vashon, Washington. Built in 1890, it was added to the National Register of Historic Places in 2000.

== Description ==
Vashon Hardware Store consists of two wood-frame structures that share an external facade. The main building is one-and-a-half stories and measures 40 by 125 feet (12 m × 38 m). The smaller building measures 16 by 40 feet (4.9 m × 12.2 m). The side-by-side buildings were constructed around 1890. Internal connections between the two buildings were added in 1973.

== History ==
Frank Gorsuch built the original structure and operated it as a general store. It was the fourth store on the Island and the first in the Town of Vashon. In 1913, the business was sold to Fred and Henry Weiss who named it Weiss Bros. General Merchandise. The building was renamed Vashon Hardware Store in 1929 when it was purchased by George McCormick and C. G. Kimmel.

After years as a retail store run by members of the McCormick family, it was reopened as a restaurant in 2005.
