= KVSH-LP =

Low-power radio station in Vashon, Washington

- Vashon, Washington; United States
- Frequency: 101.9 MHz
- Branding: KVSH 101.9FM

Programming
- Format: Community radio

Ownership
- Owner: Voice of Vashon

History
- Former call signs: KVOI-LP (2014)

Technical information
- Licensing authority: FCC
- Facility ID: 194123
- Class: L1
- ERP: 7 watts
- HAAT: 110 meters (360 ft)
- Transmitter coordinates: 47°26′6.93″N 122°27′54.80″W

Links
- Public license information: LMS
- Webcast: Listen Live
- Website: Official Website

KVSH-LP (101.9 FM) is a radio station licensed to serve the community of Vashon, Washington. The station is owned by Voice of Vashon. It airs a community radio format.

The station was assigned the call sign KVOI-LP by the Federal Communications Commission on March 3, 2014. A week later, on March 10, the station changed its call sign to KVSH-LP.
