= ARCO Center for Visual Art =

Coordinates: 34°3′5″N 118°15′25″W

The ARCO Center for Visual Art was a not-for-profit gallery, funded by the Atlantic Richfield Company in Los Angeles, California. It opened in 1976 and closed in 1984. The gallery focused on contemporary art. It was located at the Atlantic Richfield Plaza, 505 South Flower Street.

Selected exhibitors were Carlos Almaraz, Herbert Bayer, Peter Alexander, Larry Bell, Donald Cole, William Crutchfield, Walter Gabrielson, Joe Goode, George Herms, Craig Kauffman, Liga Pang, Don Potts, Joseph Raffael, Stuart Rapeport, Frank Romero, Edward Ruscha, Hassel Smith, Michael Todd.
