= Robert Miskimon =

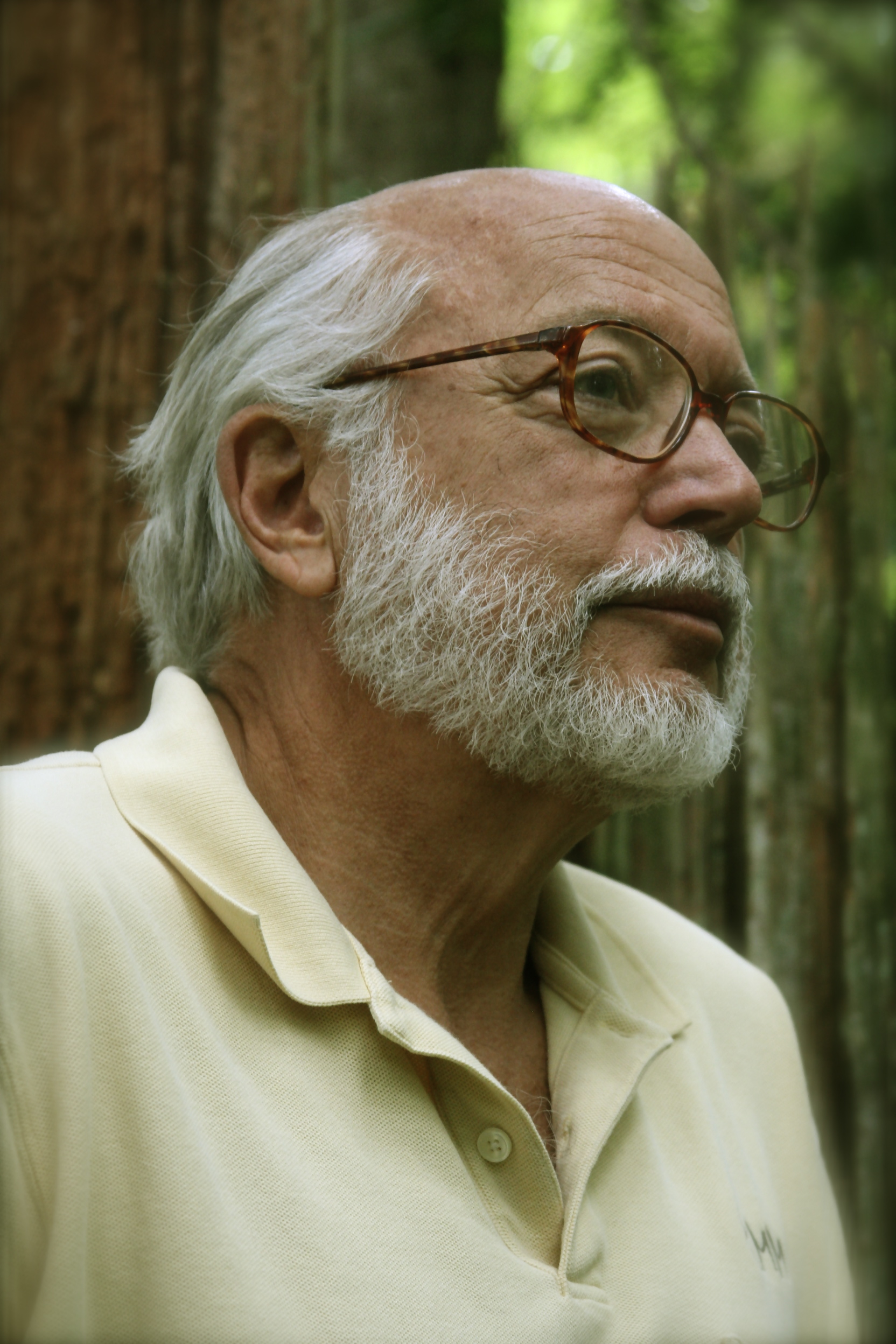
Robert Miskimon

Robert Miskimon (1943-2022) is an author, journalist and poet whose fiction has received favorable reviews in The Midwest Book Review, the Monterey Peninsula Herald and the San Francisco Review of Books. His published fiction includes A Wind Is Rising, Plastic Jesus, What Death Can Touch, Skagit, Shenandoah and La Posada, Other Stories and Poems. Fictional themes include environmental and political struggles, man's search for a spiritual home and the artist's journey toward truth and awareness.

== Personal life ==
He was born in Richmond, Virginia and lived on Vashon Island, Washington.

== Written work ==
=== Novels ===
Miskimon was part of a movement in San Francisco to establish an alternative book publishing outlet for West Coast authors in the 1970s with publication of his first novel, A Wind Is Rising, in 1976 by Anthelion Press of San Francisco. It is the story of a small community on the California coast that galvanizes to defeat a huge commercial development proposed by out-of-state interests.

In a 1976 review of A Wind Is Rising, the Monterey Peninsula Herald said "the novel is well-constructed [and] should appeal to the general reader, but particularly to Peninsulans because of the transparency of the author's disguise of several Carmel residents." The San Francisco Review of Books said "confrontations between the Carmelites and their adversaries make for some powerful dramatic moments. There are some interesting ruminations, too, about the connection between the identity of one's community and one's self."

Plastic Jesus (Barnes & Noble/iUniverse, 2000) depicts the artistic and spiritual crisis of a writer as he drives from the West Coast to the East Coast; the picaresque novel includes numerous encounters with locals that help refine his sensibilities. What Death Can Touch (Random House/Xlibris, 2000) is the story of the death of a young child and its effects on immediate family, friends and community. La Posada, Other Stories and Poems (Random House/Xlibnris, 2001) is a collection of short stories that offers a taste of life out of the mainstream of America. Skagit (Barnes & Noble/iUniverse, 2002) is the story of residents of the fictional Skagit Island in Puget Sound who, despite their many differences and idiosyncrasies, unite to crush a proposed bridge from their island to the mainland.

Midwest Book Review said in a 2007 citation: "Robert Miskimon's Skagit is a compelling novel about the people who reside on a small island in the Pacific Northwest. When a proposal to bridge their island to the mainland threatens the integrity of their refuge, the men and women of Skagit form their own community government on the island - yet the exploitation and greed that some humans resist and all humans share is not so easy to keep out. Skagit is recommended as a rewarding read examining the dual sides of human nature."

Miskimon told Contemporary Authors: "My primary motivation for writing is to bridge the terrible chasm of loneliness that separates all of us from each other. I believe all great literature achieves this by providing the reader with a link to our common humanity and suffering, from which the hope, humor and grace that sustain us can grow."

His nonfiction books include The Complete Guide to Building Your Own Tree House (Atlantic Publishing Company, 2009) and Uncovered: the Bare Facts about Nude Recreation (Amazon Kindle, 2007). He also contributed a profile of the jazz saxophonist Paul Desmond to Take Five: The Public and Private Lives of Paul Desmond (Parkside, 2005). He is winner of a 2011 Best Book Award by USA Book News for The Complete Guide to Building Your Own Tree House.

=== Journalism ===
As a journalist he has written for The Associated Press, United Press International, San Jose Mercury News, The Virgin Islands Daily News and the Seaside Post News-Sentinel. He has won California state Sigma Delta Chi journalism awards for both news (1985) and feature writing (1983), according to a profile in Contemporary American Authors. His work has also appeared in magazines such as Monterey Life, Seattle magazine, California Hospitals, Hospitals and Health Systems, Puget Sound magazine, The Crisis and a biography, Take Five: the Public and Private Lives of Paul Desmond.

Miskimon also has written for the Christian Science Monitor, the Seattle Times and the Seattle Post-Intelligencer.
