= Louis E. Hofmeister =

American politician

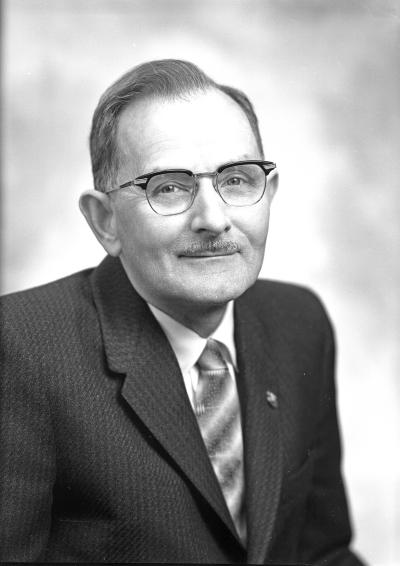
- Hofmeister in 1959

Member of the Washington House of Representatives for the 30th district
- In office 1943–1947; 1949–1955

Member of the Washington State Senate for the 30th district
- In office 1955–1963

Personal details
- Born: November 28, 1893 Portage, Washington, United States
- Died: June 24, 1973 (aged 79) Enumclaw, Washington, United States
- Party: Democratic

Louis Emil Hofmeister (November 28, 1893 – June 24, 1973) was an American politician in the state of Washington. He served in the Washington House of Representatives and Washington State Senate.
