= Helmer and Selma Steen House =

- U.S. National Register of Historic Places
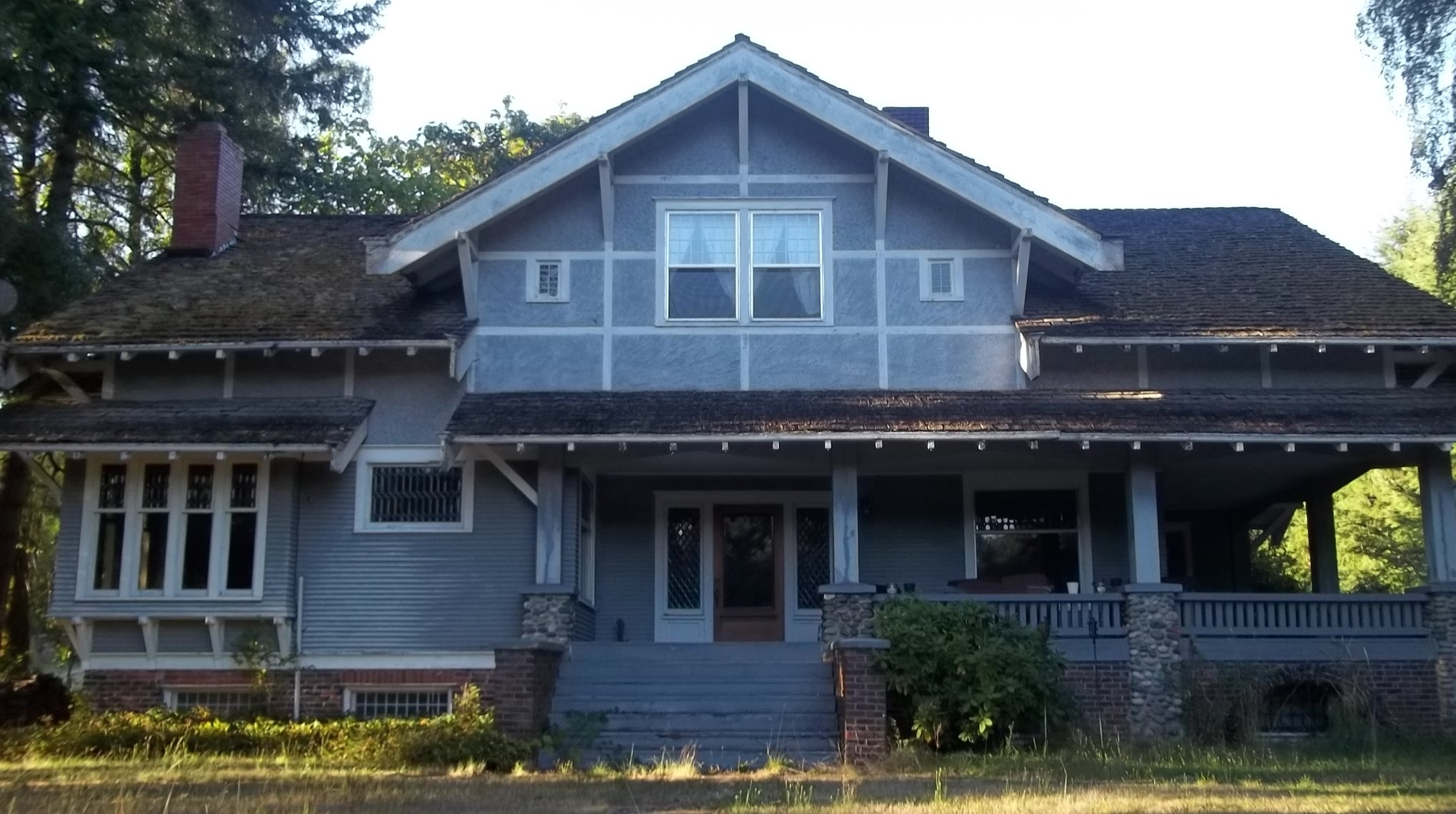
- Steen House

- Location within Washington (state) Location within the United States
- Location: 10924 SW Cove Rd., Vashon, Washington
- Coordinates: 47.456749°N 122.475311°W
- Area: 12.5 acres (5.1 ha)
- Built: 1911
- Built by: Steen, Helmer
- Architectural style: Bungalow/craftsman
- NRHP reference No.: 00000976
- Added to NRHP: August 10, 2000

The Helmer and Selma Steen House is a private home in Vashon, Washington. Built in 1911, it was added to the National Register of Historic Places in 2000.

== Description ==
The site of the Steen House was originally an 80 acres (32 ha) tract and is now 12.5 acres (5.1 ha). The American Craftsman house is a two-story 40 by 57 feet (12 m × 17 m) wood-frame structure on a concrete foundation, surrounded on three sides by a concrete walkway. A separate garage is believed to have been one of the first automobile garages on the island. (Steen was the first on the island to order an automobile, but his delivery was delayed.)

The house has two bay windows and a two-story bay. The west side of the house originally had a river rock chimney, which was destroyed by an earthquake in 1965 and replaced with a brick masonry chimney. The wide porch rests on river rock piers.

Inside the house, the stair landing is illuminated by three large stained glass windows. The house has five rooms on both the first and second floors, with four additional rooms in the basement. The kitchen has been remodeled, but most of the interior is intact, including the original hot water heater and radiators. The sandstone fireplace was replaced along with the chimney after the 1965 earthquake.

== History ==
Helmar (or Hilmar) and Selma Steen moved to Vashon Island from Norway. Steen operated a mill north of Vashon from 1900 to 1907. After building the house on Cove Road in 1911, he also built a small logging railroad and mill. The mill supplied electricity for the house, making it one of the first houses with electric power on the island.

The Steens moved to Seattle in 1923, and the house was owned by a succession of families. Around 2000, it was operated as a bed-and-breakfast with an adjacent ostrich farm. Current ownership and use is unknown.
