= Donald Cole (painter) =

American painter (born 1930)

Donald Cole (October 31, 1930, in New York City, New York) is an American abstract expressionist painter. He received a BS from Bucknell University and an MFA from the University of Iowa. He served in the Navy during the Korean War. He now lives on Vashon Island in Washington with wife Joan Wortis, also a visual artist.

His work has been exhibited in New York at 55 Mercer Gallery, French & Co., the Nancy Hoffman Gallery and the Frank Marino Gallery. Northwest showings include the Foster/White Gallery, the Jeffrey Moose Gallery and the ArtXchange Gallery in Seattle, two Tacoma Art Museum biennials and Gallery 070 on Vashon Island. He has work in a number of private and public collections, including the Portland Art Museum, the Worcester Art Museum, and the ARCO Center for Visual Art, Los Angeles.
