= Vashon Odd Fellows Hall =

Coordinates: 47°25′41″N 122°27′36″W

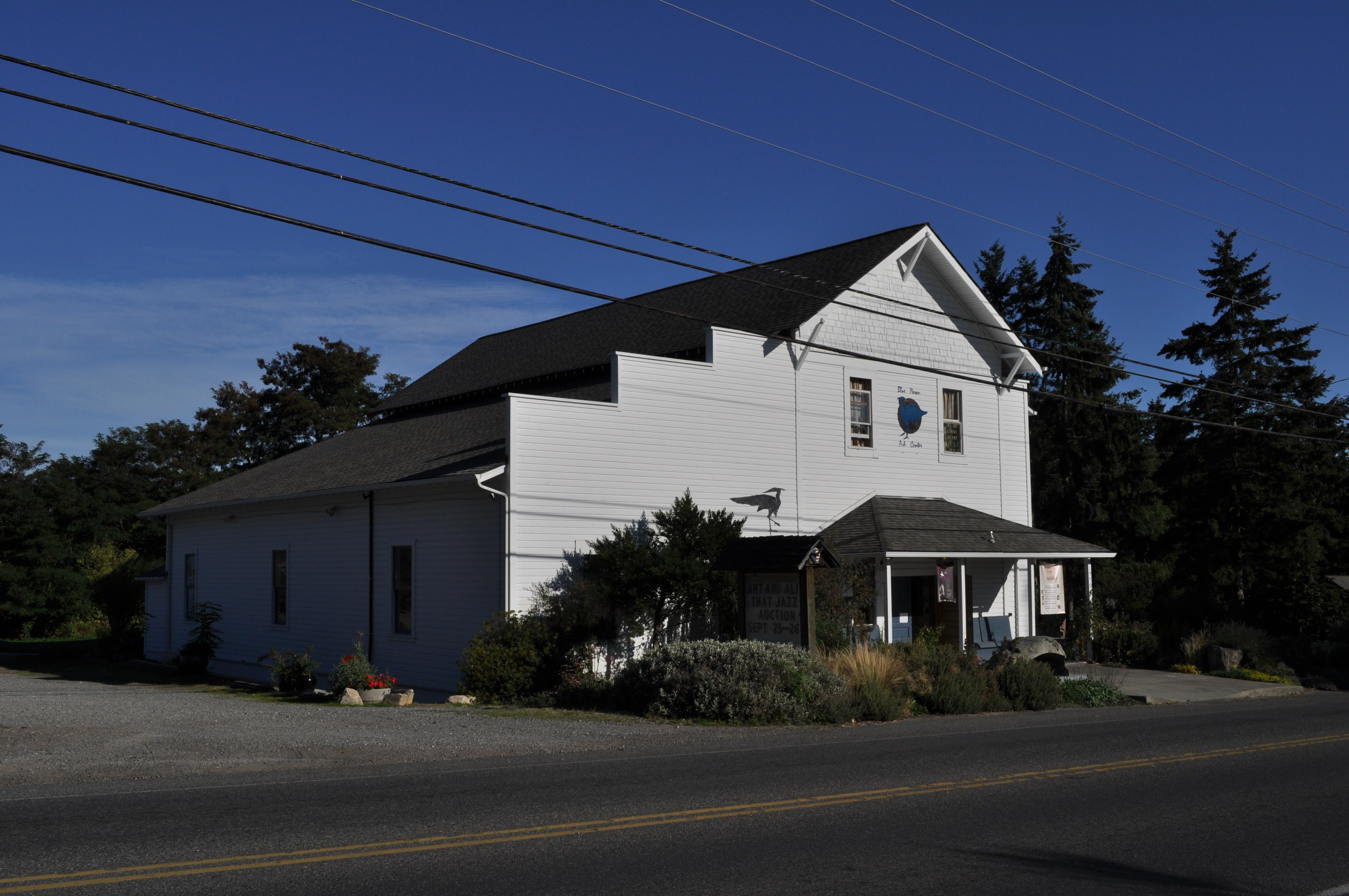
- Photo in 2009
- Interactive map of Vashon Odd Fellows Hall
- Location: 19704 Vashon Highway SW, Vashon Island, Washington

History
- Built: 1912

Francis Sherman constructed the Odd Fellows Hall on Vashon Island, Washington in 1912 with labor and materials donated by members of the Lodge. The building, which faces Vashon Highway, features a welcoming full-width front porch. In 1927, the lodge expanded the hall by adding single-story wings. The original, gable-roofed portion of the hall constitutes the center section of the present building. In conjunction with the women's chapter of the I.O.O.F. (Rebekah Lodge #277), the Odd Fellows hosted holiday celebrations, social events, and theatrical performances.

It was designated a King County and/or local landmark in 1985 and is the current home of Vashon Center for the Arts' Blue Heron Education Center where more than a thousand students participate in Arts Education, Dance and Music classes year-round.
