= Burton Masonic Hall =

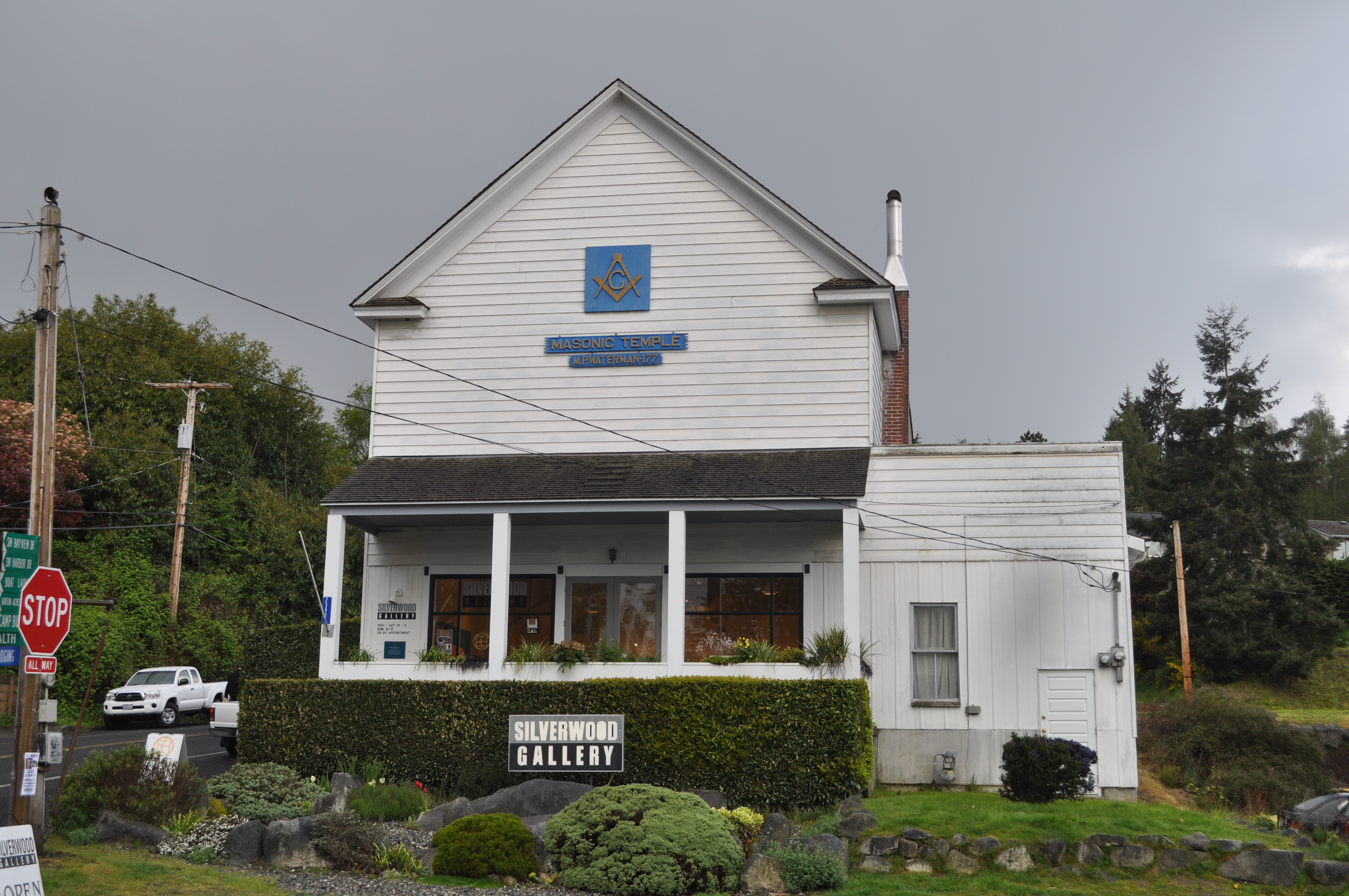
- Location: 23927 Vashon Highway SW; Vashon Island WA 98070
- Coordinates: 47°23′21.5″N 122°27′58.5″W

Burton Masonic Hall, in Burton, Washington, located on Vashon Island, was built in 1894 by the Woodmen of the World. It was taken over in 1925 by Mark P. Waterman Lodge #177, Free and Accepted Masons, which still uses the building.

It is a county landmark.
