= Mary Matsuda Gruenewald =

American writer (1925–2021)

- Born: Mary Matsuda; January 23, 1925; Vashon Island, Washington, U.S.
- Died: February 11, 2021 (aged 96); Seattle, Washington, U.S.
- Education: Vashon Island High School
- Spouse: Charles Gruenewald (m. 1951)
- Writing career
- Notable work: Looking Like the Enemy: My Story of Imprisonment in Japanese American Internment Camps

Mary Matsuda Gruenewald (née Matsuda; January 23, 1925 – February 11, 2021) was an American writer. She is best known for her autobiographical novel Looking Like the Enemy: My Story of Imprisonment in Japanese American Internment Camps, which details her own experiences as a Japanese American in World War II internment camps.

== Biography ==
=== Early life ===
Mary Matsuda was born in 1925 in Vashon Island, Washington to Heisuke and Mitsuno (née Horie) Matsuda, Japanese immigrants and farmers. She and her brother, Yoneichi, grew up in the small community of Vashon Island under idyllic circumstances. Her family owned a strawberry farm and attended a local Methodist congregation.

=== Internment experience ===
Upon learning about the Attack on Pearl Harbor in December 1941, her family destroyed their Japanese possessions. In May 1942, following the signing of Executive Order 9066, she and her family were forced from their home and placed in a series of camps, starting with Pinedale Assembly Center and progressing through Tule Lake and Heart Mountain. She graduated from high school during camp. In September 1944, after transferring her parents to Minidoka to be closer to friends from Washington state, she left to join the Cadet Nurse Corps in Clinton, Iowa.

=== Postwar life ===
After the war, Gruenewald lived in Seattle and worked in the nursing field. She met and married Charles Gruenewald, a minister, in 1951. By 1970, she had become the nurse manager of the Emergency Room of the Group Health Cooperative Hospital in Seattle.

During the post-war years, she was initially reticent to discuss or write stories about her wartime experiences. However, in 1999, she decided to write down her experiences, primarily so that her children would know the details of her experience. These were published in 2005, as Looking Like the Enemy: My Story of Imprisonment in Japanese American Internment Camps. Gruenewald was 80 years old at the time.

=== Later years ===
In 2017, she received a diploma from Vashon Island High School, which she had attended prior to being interned.

== Death ==
Gruenewald died from non-COVID related pneumonia on February 11, 2021, aged 96.

== List of works ==
- Looking Like the Enemy: My Story of Imprisonment in Japanese American Internment Camps (2005)
- Becoming Mama-San: 80 Years of Wisdom (2012)
