= Vashon, Washington =

- Census-designated place
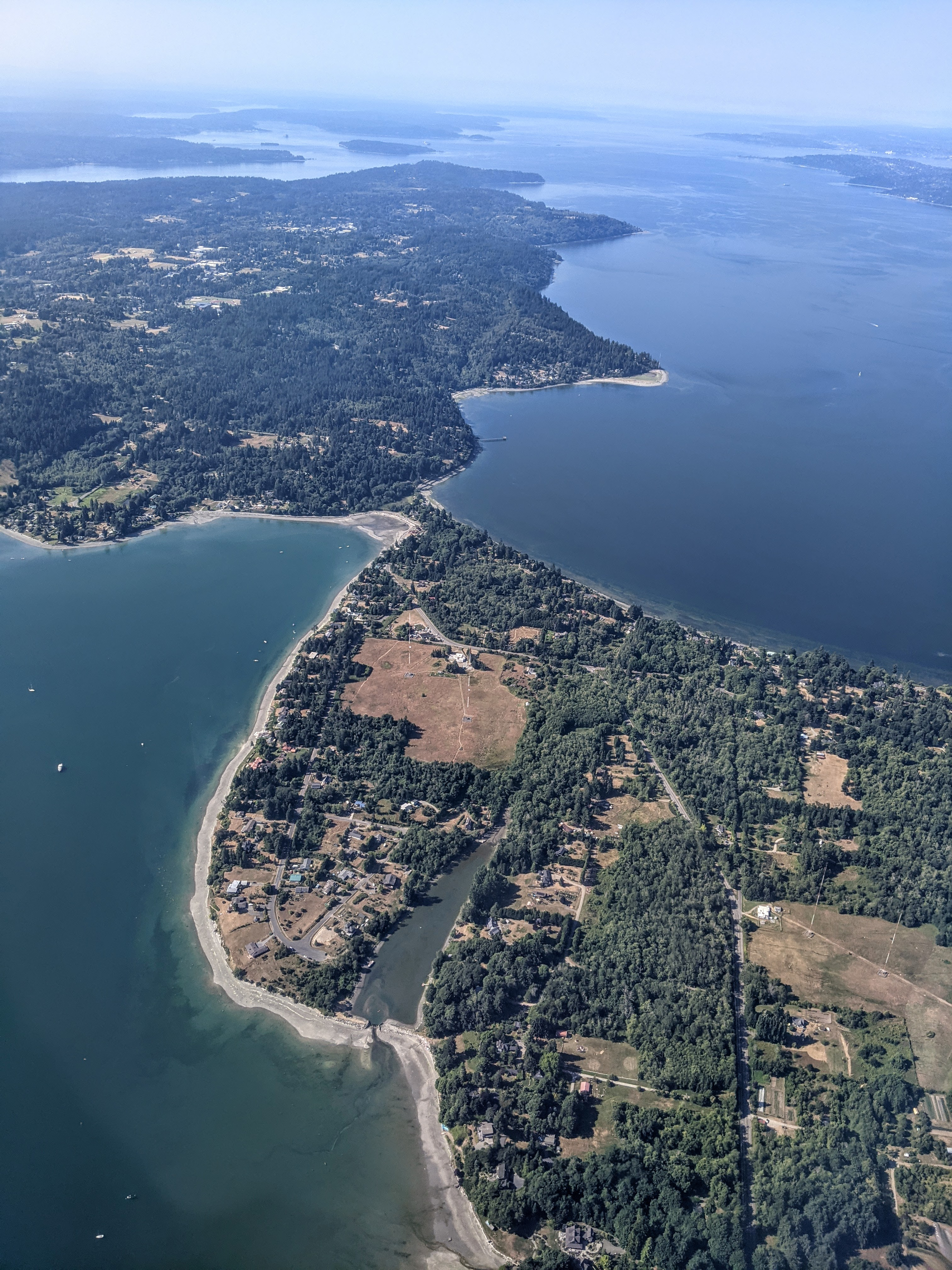
- Aerial view of Vashon and Maury islands

- Location in King County

- Location in Washington and the United States Vashon (the United States)
- Coordinates: 47°24′35″N 122°27′05″W
- Country: United States
- State: Washington
- County: King

Area
  - Total: 80.8 sq mi (209.3 km^{2})
  - Land: 36.9 sq mi (95.6 km^{2})
  - Water: 43.9 sq mi (113.6 km^{2})
- Elevation: 272 ft (83 m)

Population (2020)
  - Total: 11,055
  - Density: 300/sq mi (116/km^{2})
- Time zone: UTC−8 (Pacific (PST))
  - Summer (DST): UTC−7 (PDT)
- ZIP Codes: 98070 & 98013 (Burton)
- Area code(s): 206, 564
- FIPS code: 53-74305
- GNIS feature ID: 2409505

Vashon (/ˈvæʃɒn/, VASH-on) is a census-designated place (CDP) in King County, Washington, United States. It covers an island alternately called Vashon Island or Vashon–Maury Island, the largest island in Puget Sound south of Admiralty Inlet. Before the construction of a tombolo built in 1913, Vashon Island and Maury Island were connected only during low tide; now they are considered a tied island.

The CDP's population was 11,055 at the 2020 census, up from 10,624 in 2010. The CDP covers an area of 36.9 square miles (95.6 km^{2}).

The island is connected to West Seattle and the Kitsap Peninsula to the north and Tacoma to the south via the Washington State Ferries system, as well as to Downtown Seattle via the King County Water Taxi. The island has resisted the construction of a fixed bridge to preserve its relative isolation and rural character. Vashon Island is also known for its annual strawberry festival, sheepdog trials, and agriculture.

== History ==
Vashon Island sits in the midpoint of southern Puget Sound, between Seattle and Tacoma, Washington. In the nearby Pacific Ocean, roughly 170 miles (270 km) west of Vashon Island, lies the 700-mile (1,130 km) tectonic boundary known as the Cascadia Subduction Zone, and as such, Vashon Island is one of many areas at risk for earthquakes or related natural disasters. The Cascadia Subduction Zone last saw a major rupture in 1700, but the potential of the zone could cause one of the worst natural disasters in the history of North America.

=== Indigenous inhabitants ===
Up until the late 18th century, Vashon and Maury Islands were inhabited solely by indigenous natives, and there is evidence of human activity on Vashon Island dating back 10,000 to 12,000 years. Historical data from the era when the first people settled Vashon–Maury Island is limited. Some of the Native peoples known to have lived on Vashon Island were the Marpole culture from about 7,000 years ago, Coast Salish peoples about 1,000 years ago, and the Sqababsh (known in Chinook Wawa as the S'Homamish) starting about 500 years ago, the latter of which established 5 known major village sites. The Tulalip Tribe established villages along the shores of both islands. Fishing was abundant in the cold saltwater of the central Puget Sound basin, helping Native American tribes to thrive. Moreover, the many waterways and inlets provided easy travel by way of canoe.

=== Euramerican settlement ===
The first non–Native American to explore and the first to chart this island was Captain George Vancouver, during his surveys of the Puget Sound area with the British Royal Navy. The island was named on May 28, 1792, by Vancouver after his friend James Vashon of the Royal Navy. Starting in 1824, different explorer and settler groups stayed on Vashon Island.

Maury Island, immediately to the southeast of Vashon, was named in 1841 by then Lt. Charles Wilkes in honor of William Lewis Maury, an officer in the United States Exploring Expedition. Maury was naturally separated from Vashon by a narrow passage, until local landowners decided to build an earth bridge, or isthmus, linking them together in 1916, thus creating the hamlet of Portage. Therefore, the two-piece isle was renamed Vashon-Maury Island. Between the two sections, it covers nearly 37 square miles (96 km^{2}).

The first logging on the island began in 1852. By 1855–1856, the S'Homamish people were interned at Fox Island. European-Americans settled Vashon Island between 1865 and 1890. During that time the main economies on the island were fishing and logging.

In 1890, Japanese Americans started growing strawberries for sale. Denichiro Mukai came to the island in 1910 and became renowned for barreling fresh strawberries using a special method that concentrated flavor and moisture in the fruit and permitted long-distance shipping. In time, Mukai designed and built his own home and elaborate garden and then constructed a sturdy timber framed barreling plant. During the peak years, ice cream, jam and preserve makers across the West were customers of Mukai, relishing the oak barrels for their lingering flavor and mythologizing about the island of strawberry fields. This became an important part of the island economy during the next 50 years, until the Japanese American population was forcibly relocated into internment camps as a response to Japanese/American tension caused by WWII.

In 1892, Vashon College opened in the Burton section of Vashon. During its operation, it was one of the leading colleges in the area. It burned down in 1910.

== Geography ==
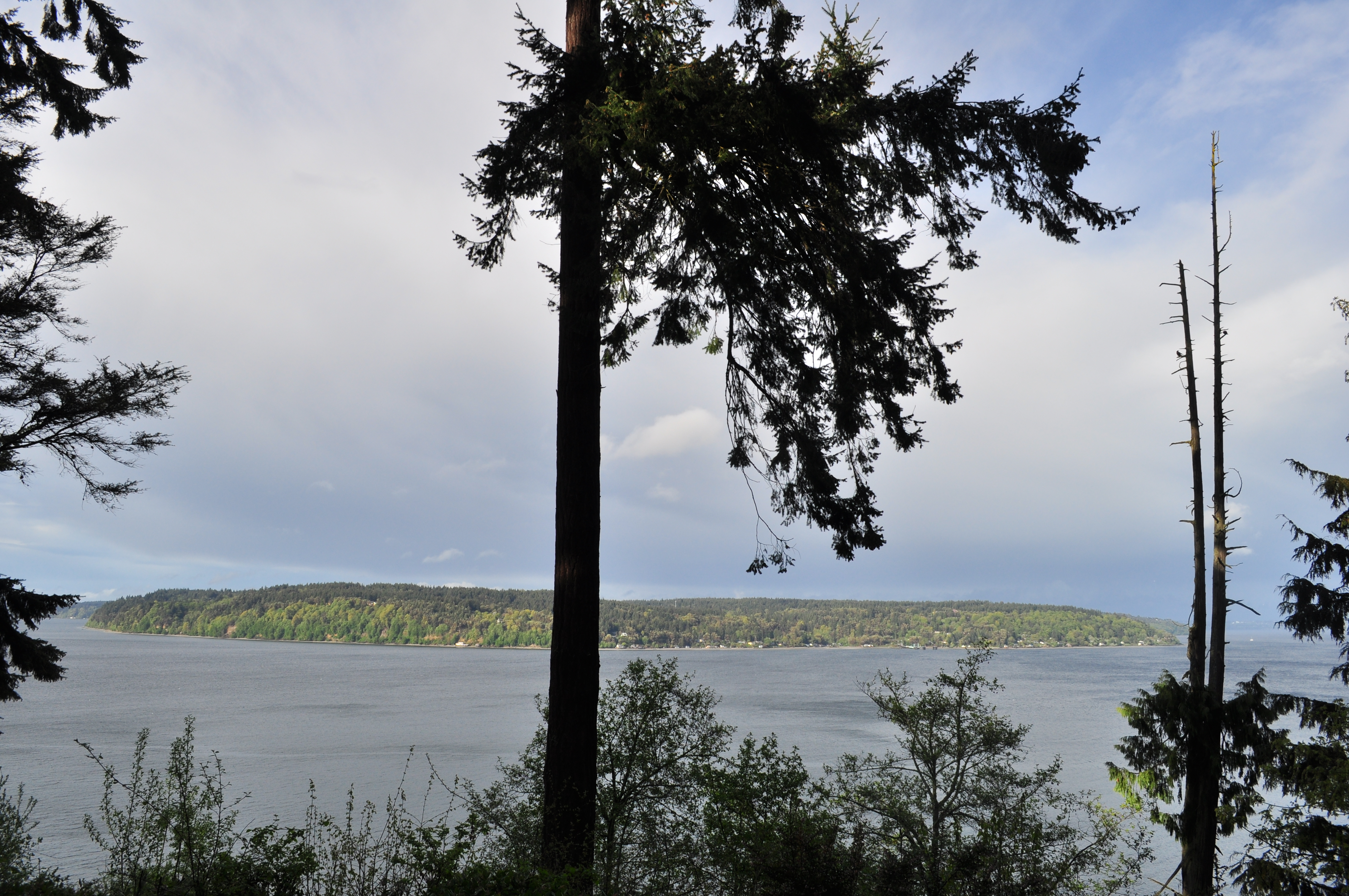
Vashon Island from Point Defiance Park

According to the United States Census Bureau, the Vashon CDP has a total area of 80.8 square miles (209.3 km^{2}), of which 36.9 square miles (95.6 km^{2}) comprise the island and 43.9 square miles (113.6 km^{2}) are the waters of Puget Sound surrounding the island.

To the west Vashon Island is separated from the Kitsap Peninsula by the Colvos Passage. The Dalco Passage separates Vashon Island from Tacoma to the south. Neighborhoods of Vashon Island include Magnolia Beach, which had a post office from 1908 to 1953, and Raeco, with a post office from 1907 to 1911.

=== Climate ===
This region experiences warm (but not hot) and dry summers, with no average monthly temperatures above 71.6 °F (22.0 °C). According to the Köppen Climate Classification system, Vashon has a warm-summer Mediterranean climate, abbreviated "Csb" on climate maps.

== Economy ==
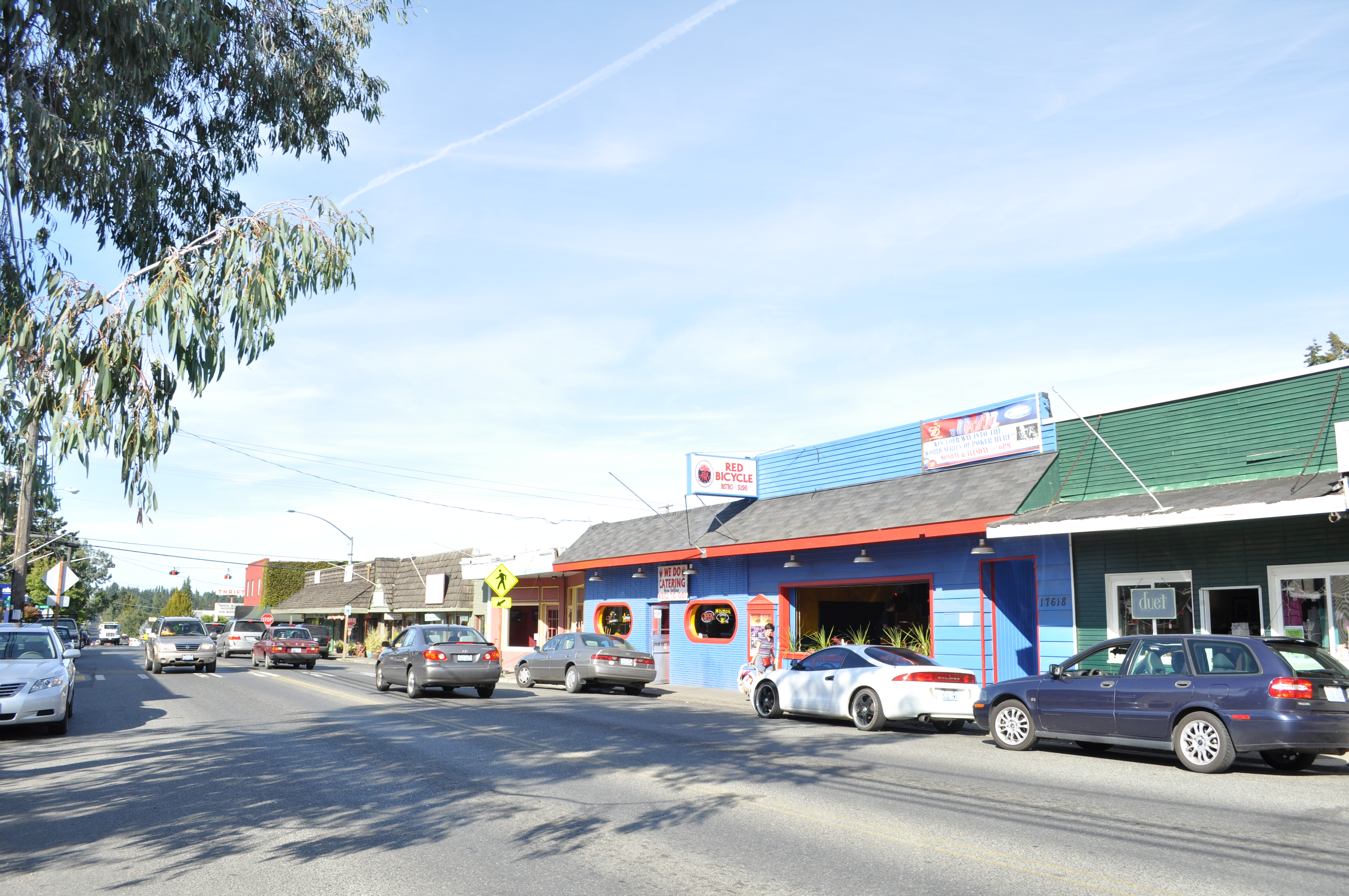
Uptown Vashon

=== Agriculture ===
While orchards and strawberry farms formerly played a major role in the Vashon economy, the pressures of suburban residential development have all but eliminated any major commercial agriculture on the island. However, many small farms operate on the island, providing locals with fresh organic produce, milk, and eggs.

Despite the changes, the island continues to observe the tradition of holding a Strawberry Festival every July. In certain areas like Dockton, a significant amount of private property was occupied and subsequently seized from Japanese-American citizens who farmed strawberries on that land until World War II, when they were moved to internment camps away from the island.

Local orchards and wineries are established on the island, with some focusing on developing perry, an alcoholic beverage derived from pear juice instead of grapes. There are at least three wineries that produce 100% locally produced wines and other alcoholic-based beverages.

=== Manufacturing and industry ===
Vashon has lost two of its major industrial employers: K2 Sports moved its manufacturing to China, and the Seattle's Best Coffee roastery operation was closed shortly after SBC was bought by Starbucks. Currently, the largest manufacturer on Vashon is Pacific Research Laboratories, locally referred to as "The Bone Factory".

In 2014 it was reported that the company Edipure was to purchase the old K2 ski plant to manufacture more than 60 marijuana-based snacks including crackers, candy and gummy bears.

== Demographics ==
Historical population
Census	Pop.	Note	%±
1900	944		—
1910	2,423		156.7%
1920	2,810		16.0%
1930	2,798		−0.4%
1940	3,118		11.4%
1950	3,889		24.7%
1960	5,182		33.2%
1970	6,516		25.7%
1980	7,377		13.2%
1990	9,309		26.2%
2000	10,123		8.7%
2010	10,624		4.9%
2020	11,055		4.1%
U.S. Decennial Census; History of Vashon Island 1880–2010; 2000 2010 2020

The population of Vashon Island grew at its fastest rate in the early 20th century, doubling from 944 in 1900 to 2,810 in 1920. The community then experienced another period of rapid growth after World War II, growing to 9,309 residents by 1990. Growth slowed to under 4 percent per decade since 1990.

Based on per capita income, Vashon ranks 32nd of 522 areas in the state of Washington to be ranked.

The United States Census Bureau listed Vashon Island as a census designated place in the 2000 U.S. census.

=== Racial and ethnic composition ===
Vashon CDP, Washington – Racial and ethnic composition Note: the US Census treats Hispanic/Latino as an ethnic category. This table excludes Latinos from the racial categories and assigns them to a separate category. Hispanics/Latinos may be of any race.
Race / Ethnicity (NH = Non-Hispanic)	Pop 2000	Pop 2010	Pop 2020	% 2000	% 2010	% 2020
White alone (NH)	9,308	9,556	9,296	91.95%	89.95%	84.09%
Black or African American alone (NH)	38	81	73	0.38%	0.76%	0.66%
Native American or Alaska Native alone (NH)	64	48	27	0.63%	0.45%	0.24%
Asian alone (NH)	155	172	226	1.53%	1.62%	2.04%
Native Hawaiian or Pacific Islander alone (NH)	6	5	11	0.06%	0.05%	0.10%
Other race alone (NH)	31	25	128	0.31%	0.24%	1.16%
Mixed race or Multiracial (NH)	262	303	663	2.59%	2.85%	6.00%
Hispanic or Latino (any race)	259	434	631	2.56%	4.09%	5.71%
Total	10,123	10,624	11,055	100.00%	100.00%	100.00%

=== 2020 census ===
As of the 2020 census, there were 11,055 people and 4,717 households living within the boundaries of the Vashon census-designated place, which encompasses the whole island. The island's population density was 136.8 inhabitants per square mile (52.8/km^{2}). Of residents, 0.0% lived in urban areas and 100.0% lived in rural areas.

There were 5,636 housing units, of which 83.7% were occupied and 16.3% were vacant or for occasional use. The homeowner vacancy rate was 1.0% and the rental vacancy rate was 4.3%. Of the 4,717 occupied housing units, 79.9% were owner-occupied and 20.1% were occupied by renters. Households with children under the age of 18 made up 22.0% of all households. Of all households, 54.3% were married-couple households, 6.5% were cohabiting but unmarried households, 15.1% were households with a male householder and no spouse or partner present, and 24.1% were households with a female householder and no spouse or partner present. About 26.1% of all households were made up of individuals, 15.4% had someone living alone who was 65 years of age or older, and 45.0% had residents who were 65 years of age or older.

The median age was 53.1 years overall, 52.0 years for males, and 54.0 years for females. Of the total population, 16.1% were under the age of 18, 17.8% were under the age of 19, 3.3% were between the ages of 20 and 24, 17.2% were between the ages of 25 and 44, 32.2% were between the ages of 45 and 64, and 29.4% were 65 years of age or older. The gender makeup of the population was 49.6% male and 50.4% female. For every 100 females there were 92.3 males, and for every 100 females age 18 and over there were 89.9 males age 18 and over.

Racial composition as of the 2020 census
Race	Number	Percent
White	9,433	85.3%
Black or African American	76	0.7%
American Indian and Alaska Native	34	0.3%
Asian	230	2.1%
Native Hawaiian and Other Pacific Islander	13	0.1%
Some other race	306	2.8%
Two or more races	963	8.7%

== Government ==
In 1994 the Vashon Island Committee for Self-Government circulated a petition calling for the incorporation of Vashon and Maury Islands. At the time only some 448 residents of about 10,000 signed the petition which was then filed with the King County Auditor.

The Vashon-Maury Island Community Council was a body whose purpose was to advise the King County Council on matters relating to Vashon Island and Maury Island. In 2013, it collapsed due to a requirement that it comply with the state's public records act and threats of lawsuits undermined the function of the organization. However, with the adoption of formal bylaws on June 15, 2020, a new Vashon-Maury Island Community Council was officially created by island residents. The new group was formed as a non-profit to help island residents address important issues facing their community.

=== Public safety ===
Vashon Fire is a combination professional-volunteer department with one staffed station, Station 55, which houses a minimum staffing of three firefighter/EMTs and two King County paramedics. Station 55 contains four aid units, one engine, one quint, one brush truck, two water tenders, one boat, one ATV, and one support unit. Vashon Fire uses ValleyCom as its dispatch center. There are two outlying stations that contain water tenders and backup engines: Station 56 located in Burton and Station 58 located in Dockton. The department is primarily funded by a property tax levy which last had a voter approved lid lift in 2017.

The island has an established emergency operations center manager who runs emergency drills with members of the community emergency response team (CERT) in order to provide the best response in times of emergencies such as earthquakes. The drills were established as routine through the group VashonBePrepared, a nonprofit, FEMA-sanctioned coalition of disaster preparedness organizations that were previously established on the island. Sometimes the drills have members of the Washington Army National Guard participating and supporting the volunteers.

=== Crime ===
There are some claims that the island is home to various drug houses, a claim which has caused the Vashon Youth & Family Services to offer substance abuse counseling as part of the regular assembly of social services.

Homicide rates on the island are extremely low, with only two homicides reported in the last twenty years and other forms of crime are also largely not seen. In 2005 the Sheriff's Office investigated one rape, six assaults, and forty-nine burglaries, in 2006 they investigated three rapes, eight assaults, and sixty-three burglaries.

Major crimes on the Island include a serial rapist who operated from 2003 through 2010 until he was arrested and charged due to DNA evidence, and a police officer who pleaded guilty to incest and other sex crimes involving his underage stepdaughter.

== Arts and culture ==
Vashon Island is described as a "rural outpost" and an artists' community due to its isolation from the rest of the Seattle metropolitan area. It has historically attracted a counterculture population, but has also become more of a bedroom community for Seattle commuters with the expansion of ferry options in the 21st century. The island also has a large arts community that supports its own organizations for opera, chamber music, and plays.

The annual studio tour was created in the late 1970s by some of the potters who lived on the island. The group was rebranded in February 2018 as the Vashon Island Visual Artists, and they applied for non-profit status in 2015. The group now operates semi-annual tours of studios of local artists, classes, workshops, salons, exhibits, and social activities for artists, with membership around 300. The island is home to a choral group established in 1989 under the name Island Singers, and now known as the Vashon Island Chorale.

On the first Friday of every month, there is a gallery walk where the art galleries in town open for visitors. The Vashon Center for the Arts along with cafés are also open during the First Friday gallery walk which have shown the work of local artists including Ann Leda Shapiro.

== Media ==
=== Broadcast radio ===
In 2014, a small media outlet, the Voice of Vashon, acquired a low-power FM radio broadcast license from the FCC. KVSH-FM went live on 101.9 FM in October 2014, and is also still available for live streaming. The Voice of Vashon started filing as a non-profit starting from the 2015 tax year. The Voice of Vashon records and broadcasts community arts events with support from King County 4Culture grants. The Voice of Vashon board includes director and producer Rick Wallace. The Voice of Vashon also operates a television station, Comcast Channel 21, and its emergency broadcast system at 1650AM. Each of these outlets serves Vashon and Maury Islands year round, 24 hours/day, 7 days/week, with island-generated or specific information, entertainment and emergency alerts.

Maury Island is home to numerous AM transmitters. KIRO 710 (built in 1941) has two massive towers for its 50,000-watt day/night transmitter. KTTH 770, which transmits 50,000 watts during the day and 5,000 watts at night, shares towers with KPTR. KIRO and KTTH are owned by Bonneville International.

There was a tower originally built in 1946 for KEVR 1090AM, which later became KING radio, and is now KPTR, owned by iHeartMedia. It transmits 50,000 watts day/night and operates three towers. This site is shared with KTTH.

On Vashon Island, radio station KVI 570 has a single tower on a beach in Tramp Harbor, nicknamed "KVI Beach". KVI transmits 24 hours a day at 5,000 watts. KNWN 1000 transmits 50,000 watts day/night and has a three-tower setup on the northeast corner of the island. Both KVI and KNWN are owned by Lotus Communications.

KGNW AM 820 propagates its signal from three towers in the center of the island. It operates 50,000 watts during the day and 5,000 at night. It is owned by Salem Media Group. KJR 950 shares the towers at the KGNW site, transmits 50,000 watts day/night, and is owned by iHeartMedia.

These stations have located their transmitters on Vashon and Maury Islands because local soil conductivity, important for signal propagation in the megawatt broadcast frequency range, is greater than elsewhere in the Puget Sound area. The surrounding sea water is also helpful for radio propagation.

== Sports and recreation ==
The island is home to the Vashon Island Rowing Club who participates in many events such as the Opening Day celebrations on Seattle's Montlake Cut. The island is also home to the Vashon Island Golf & Country Club.

The Vashon Sheepdog Classic occurred each year at the Misty Isle Farms, with local food and merchandise vendors, with all profits going to area nonprofits. The trials were completed by a team composed of a dog and its handler who were released into a shedding ring and worked to herd the sheep into specific areas. As of 2024, the Sheepdog Classic has been suspended indefinitely.

== Education ==
Public schools: There are three public schools provided by the Vashon Island School District

- Chautauqua Elementary School
- McMurray Middle School
- Vashon Island High School

Private schools: There are two private schools in Vashon.

- The Harbor School (grades 4 to 8). 65 students were enrolled as of September 2013.
- Carpe Diem Primary School (Kindergarten to 3rd grade). 26 students were enrolled as of September 2013.

== Infrastructure ==
=== Transportation ===
There are no bridges to Vashon Island, so all access to the island is by sea or by air. Most travel on and off the island is on the Washington State Ferry system. A bridge connecting Vashon to Seattle and Kitsap County was planned in 1959, but was ultimately not funded. A second bridge proposal from the Washington State Transportation Commission was withdrawn in 1992 after objections from island residents.

Vashon Municipal Airport is on the northern half of the island. There is no regularly scheduled air service to the airport.

King County Metro provides bus service down the length of the island daily. Two routes (route 118 and 119) start at the Vashon Ferry Terminal in the north; at Valley Center mid-way down the island, the routes split with route 118 serving the southern part of Vashon Island while route 119 serving Maury Island. On September 10, 2016, on-island Sunday service returned to route 118. Prior to the start of Metro service on the island in 1973, an unofficial system named "Island Transit" was operated on Vashon by a single driver.

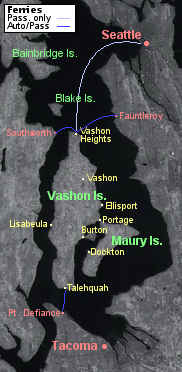
Detailed map of Vashon Island, Washington

==== Ferries ====
The southern terminus of the Vashon Highway is the Tahlequah Ferry Terminal in the Tahlequah neighborhood, connected to the Point Defiance neighborhood of Tacoma by the Point Defiance–Tahlequah ferry. The northern terminus of the Vashon Highway is the Heights Dock at Point Vashon, serving the state ferry docks at Southworth, and Fauntleroy in West Seattle. Passenger-only service from Heights Dock to Colman Dock in Downtown Seattle is provided by the King County Ferry District, with sailings throughout the day on weekdays.

As of July 1, 2024, the King County Water Taxi increased their service to the island from downtown Seattle. They now have an additional four trips in between their morning and afternoon/evening service. These extra trips are Monday through Friday and sponsored by Washington State.

The island previously had ferries that were run by private companies, including the Puget Sound Navigation Company (also known as the Black Ball Line). After a six-day strike by workers in February 1947 left Vashon Island without service, a group of residents acquired three passenger ferries and operated them on their own the following year under the King County Ferry District. The Black Ball Line planned to restart service on May 15, 1948, but were blocked by a mob of Vashon Island residents who rushed the MV Illahee when it attempted to dock. The ferry district remained without private competition until it was dissolved in 1951 and replaced by Washington State Ferries.

=== Health care ===
In 2016 it was reported that the medical clinic on the island had closed after CHI Franciscan Health had left the clinic, claiming financial concerns. Another provider, the non-profit NeighborCare Health, pledged to open a new clinic later in the year, alleviating the issue of transporting patients to hospitals off the island via the ferry, which can take upwards of three hours. NeighborCare' lease on the island's clinic expired in 2020, and as of 2025 the clinic was operated by Sea Mar.

During the 2020 COVID-19 pandemic, Vashon faced a shortage of tests, medical resources, and protective equipment. A team of local doctors created their own response plan, dubbed the "Rural Test & Trace Toolkit", with the hopes of creating a model for other isolated communities.

==== Vaccination concerns ====
Many of those who live on the island choose not to vaccinate their children due to vaccine hesitancy. It was reported in 2015 that 23.1% of kindergartners in the Vashon Island School District legally opted out of vaccinations against diphtheria and tetanus, whooping cough, measles, mumps, rubella, polio, varicella, and hepatitis B. The number, at the time, was five times the state average. Of those who do not vaccinate, more than 98% cite "Personal" rather than "Religious" or "Medical" as exemptions. Their failure to vaccinate has caused resentment in the community.

Due to expanded access to vaccines, media coverage of the measles outbreaks, and education about the benefits of vaccination, the vaccine rate for the Vashon Island School District has risen over the years, even though it is still one of the lowest in the United States. The district's rates of fully immunized students rose 31% over six years, from 56% to 74% as of the 2017–2018 school year; although still below the 95% target rate for the rest of the country. In 2019, it was reported that some 11.6% of families on the island had failed to vaccinate their children.

== Notable people ==
- Matt Alber, musician
- Gene Amondson, Prohibition Party presidential candidate
- Gene "Bean" Baxter, co-host of KROQ's Kevin and Bean radio morning show
- Steve Berlin, of the Grammy Award-winning band Los Lobos
- Alex Borstein, actress best known for voicing Lois Griffin in the animated comedy series Family Guy
- Berkeley Breathed, author of the political satire comic strip Bloom County
- Michael Chabon, writer and 2001 Pulitzer winner.
- Donald Cole, abstract expressionist painter
- Heather Corinna, feminist sex educator
- Karen Cushman, young adult fiction author
- Pete Droge, musician
- Booth Gardner, former Washington state governor
- Mary Matsuda Gruenewald, memoirist
- Art Hansen, painter and lithographer
- Louis E. Hofmeister, state representative
- Rob Hotchkiss, founding member of rock band Train
- Eyvind Kang, modern composer
- Amanda Knox, author and activist, known for having spent Italian jail time for a wrongful murder conviction
- Abe Koogler, playwright
- Michael Leavitt (artist), sculptor
- Betty MacDonald, author
- Zach Mann, reality TV star
- Robert Miskimon, author
- Ian Moore, American guitarist and singer-songwriter
- Susan Nattrass, a former world champion shooter from Canada
- Anthony O’Brien, film director, best known for Perfect Sport and The Timber
- Kaitlin Olson, actor best known for playing Deandra Reynolds
- Frank Peretti, Christian fiction writer, grew up on Vashon Island
- Jacob Plihal, Olympic rower
- Basil Poledouris, film composer
- Austin Post, aerial photographer and glaciologist
- John Ratzenberger, actor
- Peter Rinearson, Pulitzer Prize winner and entrepreneur
- Dan Savage, editor and author
- Julie Speidel, artist
- Josh Tillman, singer-songwriter, drummer with the Fleet Foxes
- Aaron Turner, Hydra Head Records and SIGE Records owner, musician
- Edith Derby Williams, historian, granddaughter of former President Theodore Roosevelt
- Benjamin F. Wilson, recipient of the Medal of Honor for his actions in the Korean War

== Points of interest ==
=== Historic landmarks ===
Vashon Island has a number of buildings and sites that are listed on the King County Historic Register:

Landmark	Built	Listed	Address	Photo
Burton Masonic Hall	1894	1995	23927 Vashon Highway SW	
Colvos Store	1923	1987	123rd Ave. SW and Cove Road	
Dockton Store and Post Office	1908	1992	25908 99th Avenue SW	
Norman Edson Studio	1890s	1985	23825 Vashon Hwy SW	
Ferncliff (Wise Mansion)	1923	1982	10350 SW Cowan Rd	
Fuller Store	1884	2013	19603 Vashon Hwy SW	
Lisabuela School	1925	2011	22029 Wax Orchard Rd SW	
Harrington-Beall Greenhouse Company Historic District	c. 1885–1886	1988–1994	18527-31 Beall Road	
Judd Creek Bridge	1953	2004	Vashon Highway	
Marjesira Inn	1906	1994	25134 Vashon Highway SW	
Thomas McNair House	1884	1993	22915 107th Avenue SW	
Mukai Agricultural Complex	1926	1993	18005-18017 107th Avenue SW	
Captain Thomas W. Phillips House	1925	1992	11312 SW 232nd Street	
Schwartz-Bell House	1930	1996	20233 81st Avenue S	
Smith-Baldwin House (Fern Cove)	1912	1995	Cedarhurst Road	
Helmer and Selma Steen House	1910	1996	10924 SW Cove Road	
Vashon Odd Fellows Hall	1912	1985	19704 Vashon Highway SW	
Vashon Hardware Store	1890, 1935	1986	17601 Vashon Highway SW	

=== Other points of interest ===
- The bike in the tree. A bicycle placed in the fork of a tree, allegedly when a child chained a bike to the tree decades ago and never picked it up, and the tree subsequently grew around it. This is a common local and tourist attraction, and has been subject to vandalism in recent years. The bike in the tree served as the inspiration for the Christmas book Red Ranger Came Calling by Berkeley Breathed.
- Point Robinson Lighthouse. Point Robinson Beach on the east shore of Maury Island has been the site of a lighthouse since 1885. The current Point Robinson lighthouse has been fully automated since 1978.
- Fisher Pond, a 90-acre terrestrial and freshwater conservancy, the largest on Vashon Island
- Jesus Barn Farm, a farmstead founded in 1893. During the 1960s it was turned into an agrarian lifestyle commune. Local lore suggests this is when the iconic "Jesus" was first painted on the side of the barn.
- Vashon Heritage Museum. The main museum building is a 1907 Lutheran Church, and the Vashon-Maury Island Heritage Association purchased the buildings in 1998. The first permanent exhibit was opened to the public in 2006. The building was designated as a King County Landmark in 2023.
