= Thomas McAdams =

US Coast Guard Master Officer

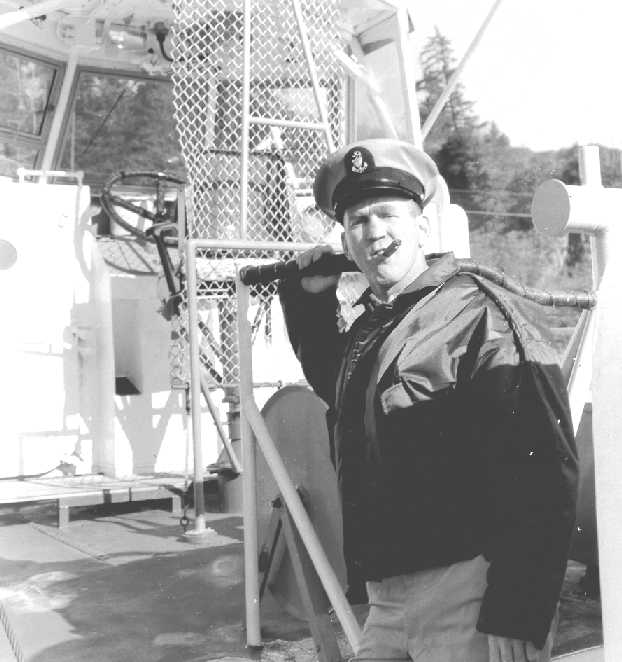
- Born: June 14, 1931 (age 94); Seattle, Washington, U.S.
- Allegiance: United States of America
- Branch: United States Coast Guard
- Service years: 1950–1977
- Rank: Master Chief Petty Officer

Thomas D. McAdams (born June 14, 1931) is a retired US Coast Guard master chief petty officer and former rescue boat commander. He is considered the most famous enlisted person to serve in the US Coast Guard in history, saving over one-hundred lives over a 27-year-long career throughout the Pacific Northwest.

After retiring from the Coast Guard in 1977, McAdams became an officer in the volunteer fire department in Newport, Oregon, the same community where he had commanded his motor lifeboats.

== Early life ==
McAdams was born in 1931 in Seattle, Washington, and was raised in the Ballard neighborhood. McAdams graduated from Ballard High School in 1950.

== Career ==
McAdams entered the US Coast Guard on December 7, 1950, in Seattle, Washington during the Korean War.

McAdams commanded the Coast Guard's 36-foot motor lifeboat, its 44-foot motor lifeboat, and its 52-foot motor lifeboat, and helped design the current 47-foot motor lifeboat. McAdams rounded out his 27-year Coast Guard career by commanding the Coast Guard's Motor Lifeboat School at Cape Disappointment, Ilwaco, Washington, where he wrote its first training manual. In 1957, he was awarded a Gold Lifesaving Medal for a case in 1957 at Yaquina Bay, where he saved four persons in a capsized boat. He retired from the U.S. Coast Guard on July 1, 1977.

In 2008, while reporting on the 100th anniversary celebration of the founding of Canada's Bamfield Station, the Victoria Times Colonist characterized McAdams as a "legendary figure in the U.S. Coast Guard", who "stole the show at the historic symposium with his on-the-job tales." McAdams' life-saving efforts were so dramatic that he appeared as a guest on several television shows, and was profiled in Life and National Geographic.

== Accolades ==
- Gold Lifesaving Medal (1957)
- Coast Guard Medal (1968)
- Legion of Merit
- Coast Guard Commendation Medal
- Meritorious Achievement Medal
