= Pacific Research Laboratories =

- Founded: 1978
- Headquarters: Vashon, Washington
- Services: prototype manufacturing design research & development

Pacific Research Laboratories, Inc. (PRL) is a design, research and development (R&D) and prototype manufacturing company. It is the leading producer of Sawbones, designed to simulate bone architecture and a bone's physical properties. It was founded in 1978. The company had 135 employees as of April 2016 and is the largest manufacturer in Vashon, Washington. It is locally referred to as "The Bone Factory."

PRL has capabilities in (R&D) prototypes, short run production, and rapid prototyping. It is the manufacturer for Seaglider fairings, wings and rudders; Seaglider is an underwater glider autonomous underwater vehicle (AUV) developed by the University of Washington. PRL also manufactures Super Shroud cell tower concealment shrouds.

The company also works in product development and design, including quick-turnaround projects using urethanes, silicones, glass/carbon fibers, braided fiberglass, thermoplastics, electronics, hydraulics, and pneumatics; the creation of prototypes, master patterns, and tooling; reverse engineering; laser scanning; and manufacturing using 3D printing, 3-axis CNC router, 4-axis CNC machining, and a triaxial fiberglass braider.

In December 2010, Pacific Research Laboratories became employee owned under an employee stock ownership plan (ESOP).
