= Art Hansen =

American artist

- Born: 1929; Vashon Island, Washington
- Died: June 28, 2017 (aged 87)
- Occupation: Artist
- Known for: Drawing, painting, lithography
- Awards: Pulitzer Award (1951); Northwest Annual – Katherine Baker Award (1952); Fulbright program (1953–1954)

Art Hansen (1929 – June 28, 2017) was an American artist from Vashon Island. Hansen was a native Washingtonian and achieved art degrees from the University of Washington and University of Minnesota.

== Education ==
Hansen graduated in 1952 from the University of Washington. In 1957, he received an MFA degree from the University of Minnesota.

== Career ==
Hansen had his first one-person show in 1952 at the Seattle Art Museum. In 1953, he was awarded a Fulbright grant to study etching at the Munich Academy of the Arts. In addition to printmaking, he worked in watercolor, oil paint, lithography, and pen and ink.

== Collections ==
Hansen's work is represented in the permanent collections of the Seattle Art Museum, Tacoma Art Museum, the Portland Art Museum, among others.
