= Magnolia Beach, Washington =

Unincorporated community in Washington, US

- Unincorporated community
- Location in Washington and the United States Magnolia Beach (the United States)
- Coordinates: 47°22′55″N 122°28′59″W
- Country: United States
- State: Washington
- County: King
- Elevation: 20 ft (6.1 m)
- Time zone: UTC-8 (Pacific (PST))
  - Summer (DST): UTC-7 (PDT)
- Area code: 360
- GNIS feature ID: 1506423

Magnolia Beach is an unincorporated community in King County, in the U.S. state of Washington.

== History ==
A post office called Magnolia Beach was established in 1908, and remained in operation until 1953. The community's name in part is a transfer from Magnolia, Iowa, the former home of a family of first settlers.
