= Cedarcrest High School =

Location
- 29000 NE 150th Street; Duvall, Washington 98019; United States; 47°44′09″N 121°57′09″W

Information
- Type: Public secondary school
- Established: 1993
- School district: Riverview School District (#407)
- NCES District ID: 5304560
- CEEB code: 480145
- NCES School ID: 530456000716
- Principal: Tracie Kelly
- Vice Principal: Jason Frederick
- Faculty: 71
- Teaching staff: 44.72 (on an FTE basis)
- Grades: 9–12
- Enrollment: Approximately 920
  - Grade 12: 226
- Student to teacher ratio: 20.82
- Colors: Crimson, Black, & Grey
- Athletics: WIAA Class 2A
- Athletics conference: KingCo 2A
- Mascot: Red Wolf
- Nickname: Red Wolves
- Website: chs.rsd407.org

Cedarcrest High School (CHS) is a four-year public secondary school located in Duvall, Washington. It opened its doors in 1993, and is the only traditional high school in Riverview School District #407.

The boundary of its school district includes Carnation, Duvall, Lake Marcel-Stillwater, and portions of Ames Lake, Cottage Lake, and Union Hill-Novelty Hill.

== Extracurriculars ==
Sports offered by Cedarcrest by season: Fall: Football, Cheer, Volleyball, Girls Soccer, Boys Golf, and Cross Country. Winter: Girls Flag Football, Boys Basketball, Girls Basketball, and Boys and Girls Wrestling. Spring: Baseball, Fast Pitch Softball, Golf, Boys Soccer, and Track and Field. Cedarcrest competes in WIAA Class 2A in the KingCo Conference.

The Cedarcrest baseball team (2A) and drill team (3A) won state titles in 2009.

Musical programs offered at CHS: Jazz Band 1 and 2, Athletic Band, Concert Band, Wind Ensemble, Choir, Percussion, and Drumline.

== History ==
Cedarcrest High School opened in 1993, replacing Tolt High School as the high school in the Riverview School District, with the old campus becoming Tolt Middle School. The first graduating class was the class of 1994.
