= Union Hill-Novelty Hill, Washington =

- Census-designated place
- Location of Union Hill-Novelty Hill, Washington
- Coordinates: 47°40′04″N 121°59′57″W
- Country: United States
- State: Washington
- County: King

Area
  - Total: 24.32 sq mi (62.98 km^{2})
  - Land: 24.23 sq mi (62.75 km^{2})
  - Water: 0.089 sq mi (0.23 km^{2})
- Elevation: 551 ft (168 m)

Population (2020)
  - Total: 22,683
  - Density: 936.2/sq mi (361.5/km^{2})
- Time zone: UTC-8 (Pacific (PST))
  - Summer (DST): UTC-7 (PDT)
- FIPS code: 53-73307
- GNIS feature ID: 2409379

Union Hill-Novelty Hill is a census-designated place (CDP) in King County, Washington, United States. The area was first recognized by the Census Bureau in the 2000 census. The population was 22,683 at the 2020 census.

Based on per capita income, Union Hill-Novelty Hill ranks 5th of 522 areas in the state of Washington to be ranked.

== Geography ==
Union Hill-Novelty Hill is located in northern King County and is bordered to the west by the city of Redmond, and a separate portion of the city, comprising the Redmond Watershed Preserve, is surrounded by the northern part of the CDP. To the north is the Cottage Lake CDP, and Washington State Route 202 runs along the southern edge of the community in the valley of Evans Creek and Patterson Creek. The Ames Lake CDP is to the southeast, and downtown Seattle is 20 miles (32 km) to the southwest.

According to the United States Census Bureau, the Union Hill-Novelty Hill CDP has a total area of 24.3 square miles (63.0 km^{2}), of which 24.2 square miles (62.8 km^{2}) are land and 0.1 square miles (0.2 km^{2}), or 0.36%, are water.

== Demographics ==
Historical population
Census	Pop.	Note	%±
2000	11,265		—
2010	18,805		66.9%
2020	22,683		20.6%
U.S. Decennial Census; 1990 2000 2010

Union Hill-Novelty Hill first appeared as a census designated place in the 2000 U.S. census.

=== Racial and ethnic composition ===
Union Hill-Novelty Hill CDP, Washington – Racial and ethnic composition Note: the US Census treats Hispanic/Latino as an ethnic category. This table excludes Latinos from the racial categories and assigns them to a separate category. Hispanics/Latinos may be of any race.
Race / Ethnicity (NH = Non-Hispanic)	Pop 2000	Pop 2010	Pop 2020	% 2000	% 2010	% 2020
White alone (NH)	9,979	14,460	13,517	88.58%	76.89%	59.59%
Black or African American alone (NH)	88	143	326	0.78%	0.76%	1.44%
Native American or Alaska Native alone (NH)	38	28	29	0.34%	0.15%	0.13%
Asian alone (NH)	477	2,792	6,190	4.23%	14.85%	27.29%
Native Hawaiian or Pacific Islander alone (NH)	7	10	14	0.06%	0.05%	0.06%
Other race alone (NH)	31	67	97	0.28%	0.36%	0.43%
Mixed race or Multiracial (NH)	256	587	1,215	2.27%	3.12%	5.36%
Hispanic or Latino (any race)	389	718	1,295	3.45%	3.82%	5.71%
Total	11,265	18,805	22,683	100.00%	100.00%	100.00%

=== 2020 census ===
As of the 2020 census, Union Hill-Novelty Hill had a population of 22,683. The median age was 42.8 years. 26.2% of residents were under the age of 18 and 19.8% of residents were 65 years of age or older. For every 100 females there were 96.4 males, and for every 100 females age 18 and over there were 92.6 males age 18 and over.

87.6% of residents lived in urban areas, while 12.4% lived in rural areas.

There were 8,137 households in Union Hill-Novelty Hill, of which 39.9% had children under the age of 18 living in them. Of all households, 71.1% were married-couple households, 9.7% were households with a male householder and no spouse or partner present, and 16.7% were households with a female householder and no spouse or partner present. About 17.8% of all households were made up of individuals and 10.9% had someone living alone who was 65 years of age or older.

There were 8,419 housing units, of which 3.3% were vacant. The homeowner vacancy rate was 0.6% and the rental vacancy rate was 3.2%.

Racial composition as of the 2020 census
Race	Number	Percent
White	13,761	60.7%
Black or African American	343	1.5%
American Indian and Alaska Native	73	0.3%
Asian	6,206	27.4%
Native Hawaiian and Other Pacific Islander	19	0.1%
Some other race	373	1.6%
Two or more races	1,908	8.4%

=== 2000 census ===
As of the 2000 census, there were 11,265 people, 3,584 households, and 3,103 families residing in the CDP. The population density was 462.9 people per square mile (178.7/km^{2}). There were 3,677 housing units at an average density of 151.1/sq mi (58.3/km^{2}). The racial makeup of the CDP was 90.77% White, 0.78% African American, 0.39% Native American, 4.25% Asian, 0.06% Pacific Islander, 1.30% from other races, and 2.45% from two or more races. Hispanic or Latino people of any race were 3.45% of the population.

There were 3,584 households, out of which 53.4% had children under the age of 18 living with them, 78.7% were married couples living together, 4.9% had a female householder with no husband present, and 13.4% were non-families. 9.0% of all households were made up of individuals, and 2.0% had someone living alone who was 65 years of age or older. The average household size was 3.14 and the average family size was 3.37.

In the CDP the population was spread out, with 33.3% under the age of 18, 5.1% from 18 to 24, 31.2% from 25 to 44, 26.0% from 45 to 64, and 4.3% who were 65 years of age or older. The median age was 36 years. For every 100 females there were 106.7 males. For every 100 females age 18 and over, there were 102.5 males.

The median income for a household in the CDP was $98,061, and the median income for a family was $105,758. Males had a median income of $77,954 versus $46,167 for females. The per capita income for the CDP was $58,285. About 2.3% of families and 2.9% of the population were below the poverty line, including 2.6% of those under age 18 and 3.5% of those age 65 or over.

== Education ==
Most of the community is in the Lake Washington School District. Other portions are in the Riverview School District and in the Snoqualmie Valley School District.
