= Carnation, Washington =

Carnation, Washington tultxʷ
- City
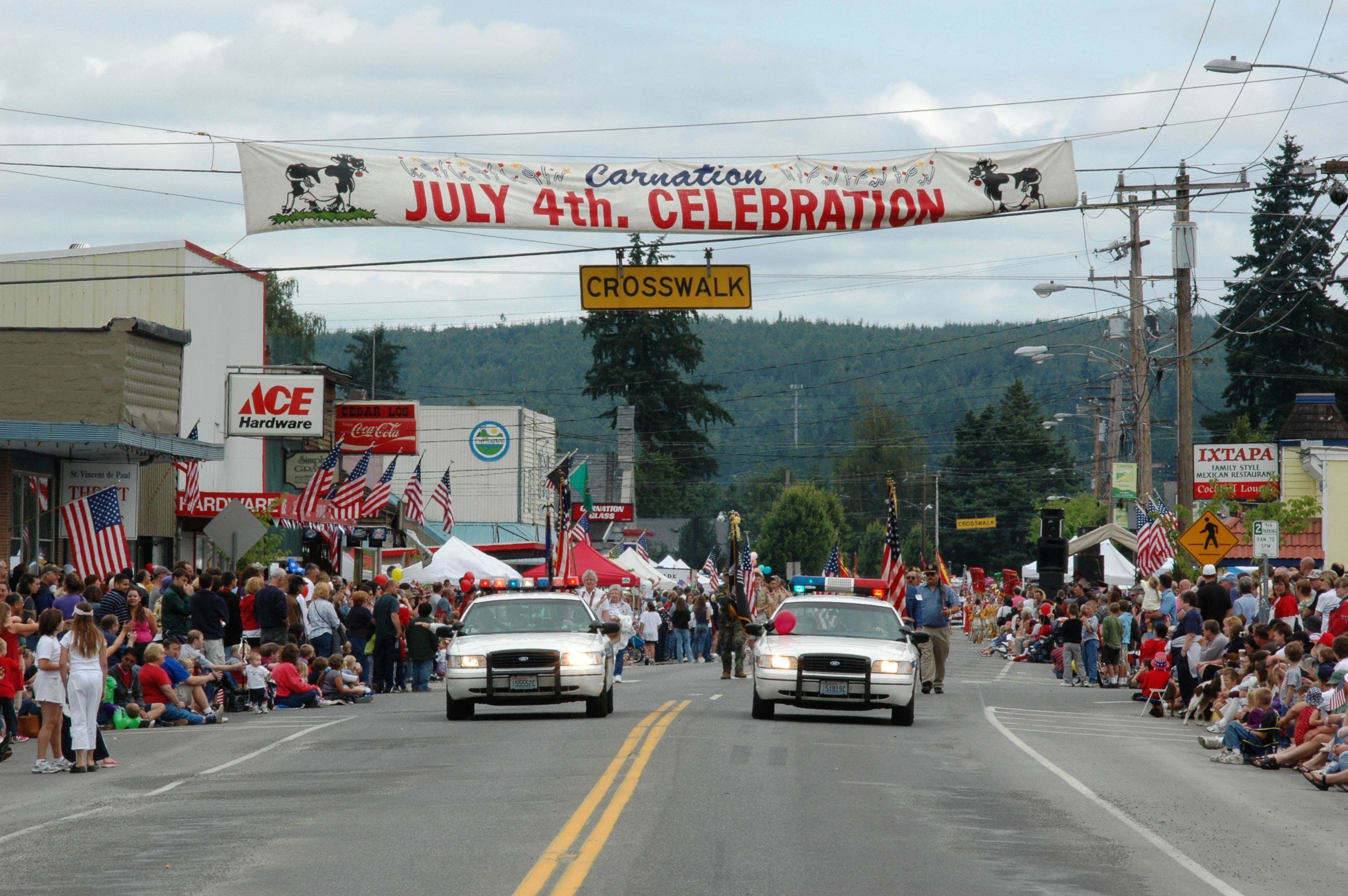
- Carnation, Washington. July 4, 2004

- Logo
- Interactive map of Carnation, Washington
- Coordinates: 47°38′15″N 121°53′12″W
- Country: United States
- State: Washington
- County: King

Government
  - Type: Council–manager
  - Mayor: Adair Hawkins
  - Deputy Mayor: Jim Ribail

Area
  - Total: 1.19 sq mi (3.07 km^{2})
  - Land: 1.16 sq mi (3.00 km^{2})
  - Water: 0.027 sq mi (0.07 km^{2})
- Elevation: 102 ft (31 m)

Population (2020)
  - Total: 2,158
  - Density: 1,970/sq mi (761/km^{2})
- Time zone: UTC-8 (Pacific (PST))
  - Summer (DST): UTC-7 (PDT)
- ZIP code: 98014
- Area code: 425
- FIPS code: 53-10215
- GNIS feature ID: 2409989
- Website: www.carnationwa.gov

Carnation (Lushootseed: tultxʷ) is a city in King County, Washington, United States. It was historically known as Tolt and lies at the confluence of the Snoqualmie and Tolt rivers.

The city is located east of Sammamish and south of Duvall on State Route 203. The population was 2,158 at the 2020 census. Prior to American settlement, the area was occupied by a large village of the Snoqualmie Tribe. It was the center of Snoqualmie society in the 19th century. After their removal to reservations, the city was resettled by Americans, who founded the city of Tolt in 1865. It became a thriving dairy town in the 20th century, eventually being renamed to Carnation in honor of the Carnation Evaporated Milk Company. After being renamed again back and forth twice, the name Carnation stuck. In the 1990s, the city became a bedroom community for the Seattle Eastside.

== History ==
=== Snoqualmie settlement ===
The Snoqualmie people have inhabited the Carnation area for more than 10,000 years. Prior to American settlement, the Snoqualmie had a large village spanning the Tolt River (Lushootseed: tultxʷ) at its confluence with the Snoqualmie. This village was highly important as it was the second-largest village in the Snoqualmie river valley. The village also had the best natural defenses in the Snoqualmie river valley.

The most important building in the village was the x̌alalʔtxʷ (lit. "marked house"). The x̌alalʔtxʷ was a giant longhouse which served as a sort of capitol building, where council was held by both local elders and visiting leaders. It also was an education center for all the people living in the Snoqualmie valley. Elders taught valuable skills and knowledge, such as Snoqualmie language, customs, and laws.

In the 19th century, the prominent Snoqualmie leader Patkanim (Lushootseed: p̓əƛ̕qidəb) was born in this village. At this time, Snoqualmie society began to centralize into a chiefdom. During the colonial period, the village served as the de facto capital of the Snoqualmie chiefdom under Patkanim.

=== American settlement ===
The Snoqualmie Valley was resettled by Americans in the 1850s and 1860s following the signing of the 1855 Treaty of Point Elliot and the relocation of many of the Snoqualmie people to reservations like Tulalip. The community of Tolt was founded in 1865 and platted in 1902. The name of the community was derived from an Anglicization of the Lushootseed name for the Tolt River and the Snoqualmie village (variously spelled as tultxʷ, dxʷtultxʷ, or tulq in Lushootseed). Tolt was incorporated as a town on December 30, 1912, shortly after the arrival of the Milwaukee Road, which provided train connections to Monroe in the north.

The valley was home to several dairy farms established in the 1900s, including a research farm for the Carnation Evaporated Milk Company. Following lobbying from the company and the approval of the state legislature, Tolt was renamed to "Carnation" in 1917. The renaming of the town was opposed by local residents and members of the Snoqualmie Indian Tribe, and later changed back to Tolt on May 3, 1928. The "Carnation" name remained on the post office and train depot, and continued to be used by outsiders. Tolt was then renamed back to "Carnation" on October 29, 1951. During the late 20th century, Carnation moved away from dairy farming and became a community for job centers in the Eastside, growing to a population of 2,158 by 2020.

== Geography ==
Carnation lies in the Snoqualmie Valley between Duvall and Fall City. It is on the east bank of the Snoqualmie River just north of its junction with the Tolt River.

According to the United States Census Bureau, the city has a total area of 1.18 square miles (3.06 km^{2}), of which, 1.16 square miles (3.00 km^{2}) is land and 0.02 square miles (0.05 km^{2}) is water.

Langlois Lake lies just outside city limits.

=== Climate ===
Carnation has a warm-summer mediterranean climate (Köppen Csb).

Climate data for Carnation
| Month | Jan | Feb | Mar | Apr | May | Jun | Jul | Aug | Sep | Oct | Nov | Dec | Year |
|---|---|---|---|---|---|---|---|---|---|---|---|---|---|
| Record high °F (°C) | 58 (14) | 64 (18) | 68 (20) | 85 (29) | 88 (31) | 107 (42) | 100 (38) | 99 (37) | 91 (33) | 79 (26) | 69 (21) | 60 (16) | 107 (42) |
| Mean maximum °F (°C) | 52.0 (11.1) | 53.3 (11.8) | 60.0 (15.6) | 69.9 (21.1) | 80.2 (26.8) | 83.6 (28.7) | 88.8 (31.6) | 91.0 (32.8) | 83.1 (28.4) | 68.7 (20.4) | 58.9 (14.9) | 51.5 (10.8) | 92.9 (33.8) |
| Mean minimum °F (°C) | 24.0 (−4.4) | 22.1 (−5.5) | 26.8 (−2.9) | 31.4 (−0.3) | 36.6 (2.6) | 41.4 (5.2) | 47.2 (8.4) | 48.3 (9.1) | 41.5 (5.3) | 34.7 (1.5) | 25.1 (−3.8) | 21.8 (−5.7) | 15.5 (−9.2) |
| Record low °F (°C) | 6 (−14) | 12 (−11) | 22 (−6) | 28 (−2) | 28 (−2) | 35 (2) | 38 (3) | 41 (5) | 30 (−1) | 23 (−5) | 5 (−15) | 8 (−13) | 5 (−15) |
| Average precipitation inches (mm) | 4.41 (112) | 3.09 (78) | 3.26 (83) | 2.2 (56) | 1.56 (40) | 1.07 (27) | 0.39 (9.9) | 0.57 (14) | 1.28 (33) | 3.05 (77) | 5.1 (130) | 4.86 (123) | 30.84 (782.9) |
Source 1: National Weather Service
Source 2: for precipitation data

== Attractions ==
Carnation is home to Remlinger Farms, a 350-acre (140 ha) working farm that also has an amusement park, market, brewery, and other activities. It hosts various events and had 200,000 annual visitors by 2023. Since 2024, the farm has hosted a seasonal concert venue during the summers with a capacity of 6,000 spectators.

To the north of the city is Camlann Medieval Village, a living history museum that recreates a medieval English village set in the year 1376. It lies on 36 acres (15 ha) and serves 5,000 annual visitors at its buildings and farms, which include re-enactments of various trades and crafts. The village was created by volunteers in the 1980s and became a full living history museum in 2006.

== Demographics ==
Historical population
| Census | Pop. | Note | %± |
|---|---|---|---|
| 1920 | 536 | | — |
| 1930 | 360 | | −32.8% |
| 1940 | 460 | | 27.8% |
| 1950 | 446 | | −3.0% |
| 1960 | 490 | | 9.9% |
| 1970 | 530 | | 8.2% |
| 1980 | 913 | | 72.3% |
| 1990 | 1,243 | | 36.1% |
| 2000 | 1,893 | | 52.3% |
| 2010 | 1,786 | | −5.7% |
| 2020 | 2,158 | | 20.8% |
U.S. Decennial Census; 2020 Census

=== 2020 census ===
As of the 2020 census, Carnation had a population of 2,158. The median age was 38.4 years. 26.8% of residents were under the age of 18 and 9.9% of residents were 65 years of age or older. For every 100 females there were 92.5 males, and for every 100 females age 18 and over there were 93.5 males age 18 and over.

0.0% of residents lived in urban areas, while 100.0% lived in rural areas.

There were 769 households in Carnation, of which 42.0% had children under the age of 18 living in them. Of all households, 61.9% were married-couple households, 12.6% were households with a male householder and no spouse or partner present, and 19.5% were households with a female householder and no spouse or partner present. About 16.8% of all households were made up of individuals and 6.1% had someone living alone who was 65 years of age or older.

There were 814 housing units, of which 5.5% were vacant. The homeowner vacancy rate was 2.7% and the rental vacancy rate was 1.9%.

Racial composition as of the 2020 census
| Race | Number | Percent |
|---|---|---|
| White | 1,629 | 75.5% |
| Black or African American | 38 | 1.8% |
| American Indian and Alaska Native | 9 | 0.4% |
| Asian | 140 | 6.5% |
| Native Hawaiian and Other Pacific Islander | 9 | 0.4% |
| Some other race | 77 | 3.6% |
| Two or more races | 256 | 11.9% |
| Hispanic or Latino (of any race) | 225 | 10.4% |

=== 2010 census ===
At the 2010 census, there were 1,786 people in 631 households, including 474 families, in the city. The population density was 1,539.7 inhabitants per square mile (594.5/km^{2}). There were 665 housing units at an average density of 573.3 units per square mile (221.4 units/km^{2}). The racial makeup of the city was 85.8% White, 0.9% African American, 1.0% Native American, 3.1% Asian, 0.1% Pacific Islander, 7.1% from other races, and 2.1% from two or more races. Hispanic or Latino of any race were 12.7%.

Of the 631 households, 45.0% had children under the age of 18 living with them, 58.5% were married couples living together, 10.0% had a female householder with no husband present, 6.7% had a male householder with no wife present, and 24.9% were non-families. 19.0% of households were one person, and 6.9% were one person aged 65 or older. The average household size was 2.83 and the average family size was 3.24.

The median age was 34.9 years. 30.1% of residents were under the age of 18; 6.8% were between the ages of 18 and 24; 29.4% were from 25 to 44; 27.7% were from 45 to 64; and 6% were 65 or older. The gender makeup of the city was 49.8% male and 50.2% female.

Carnation has a high rate of home ownership for King County; 73.31% of the homes in Carnation are occupied by people who own them. This rate is considerably higher than nearby cities like Redmond (50.19%), Bellevue (53.78%), and Seattle (44.91%).

=== 2000 census ===
At the 2000 census, there were 1,893 people in 636 households, including 487 families, in the city. The population density was 1,728.4 inhabitants per square mile (667.3/km^{2}). There were 650 housing units at an average density of 593.5 units per square mile (229.2 units/km^{2}). The racial makeup of the city was 91.76% White, 1.32% Native American, 3.59% Asian, 0.16% Pacific Islander, 1.80% from other races, and 1.37% from two or more races. Hispanic or Latino of any race were 3.91% of the population.

Of the 636 households, 48.9% had children under the age of 18 living with them, 61.8% were married couples living together, 9.9% had a female householder with no husband present, and 23.4% were non-families. 17.5% of households were one person, and 7.2% were one person aged 65 or older. The average household size was 2.98 and the average family size was 3.40.

In the city the population was spread out, with 34.4% under the age of 18, 6.6% from 18 to 24, 37.5% from 25 to 44, 15.9% from 45 to 64, and 5.7% 65 or older. The median age was 32 years. For every 100 females, there were 98.6 males. For every 100 females age 18 and over, there were 96.5 males.

The median household income was $60,156 and the median family income was $64,167. Males had a median income of $46,667 versus $33,281 for females. The per capita income for the city was $21,907. About 5.8% of families and 6.7% of the population were below the poverty line, including 7.5% of those under age 18 and 6.5% of those age 65 or over.

== Schools ==
Carnation is in the Riverview School District, which consists of 4 traditional elementary schools and a homeschooling parent partnership program: Carnation Elementary and PARADE Program, Cherry Valley Elementary, Eagle Rock Multi-Age, and Stillwater Elementary, a single middle school: Tolt Middle School, and a single high school: Cedarcrest High School.

- Carnation Elementary: Located in Carnation
- Cherry Valley Elementary: Located in Duvall, Washington
- Stillwater Elementary: Located between Carnation and Duvall
- Eagle Rock Multi-Age: Located in Duvall
- Tolt Middle School: Located in Carnation
- Cedarcrest High School: Located in Duvall

== City landmarks ==
The City of Carnation has designated the following landmarks:

| Landmark | Built | Listed | Address | Photo |
|---|---|---|---|---|
| Commercial Hotel | 1913 | 1996 | 31933 W. Rutherford Street | |
| Entwistle House | 1912 | 1994 | 32021 Entwistle Street | |
| Tolt IOOF/Eagles Hall | 1895 | 1994 | 3940 Tolt Avenue, Carnation | |

== Government and police ==
Presidential Elections Results
| Year | Republican | Democratic | Third Parties |
|---|---|---|---|
| 2020 | 33.15% 432 | 62.78% 818 | 4.07% 53 |

Carnation's government has a council-manager structure with five elected council members. Every other January, the council members elect from their body a mayor. The incumbent mayor as of 2025 is Adair Hawkins and Jim Rabail is the deputy mayor.

Law enforcement services in Carnation has changed hands several times throughout its history. Until late 2004, the King County Sheriff's Office provided law enforcement services to the city on a contract basis. From late 2004 until January 1, 2014, the city contracted with the City of Duvall Police Department for law enforcement services. Effective January 1, 2014 the city is again contracting with the King County Sheriff's Office. The contract with the KCSO provides for one full-time dedicated officer to the city, when that officer is not working KCSO Deputies patrolling neighboring unincorporated areas will respond to calls in the city.
