= Lake Rasmussen =

Lake in Duvall, Washington

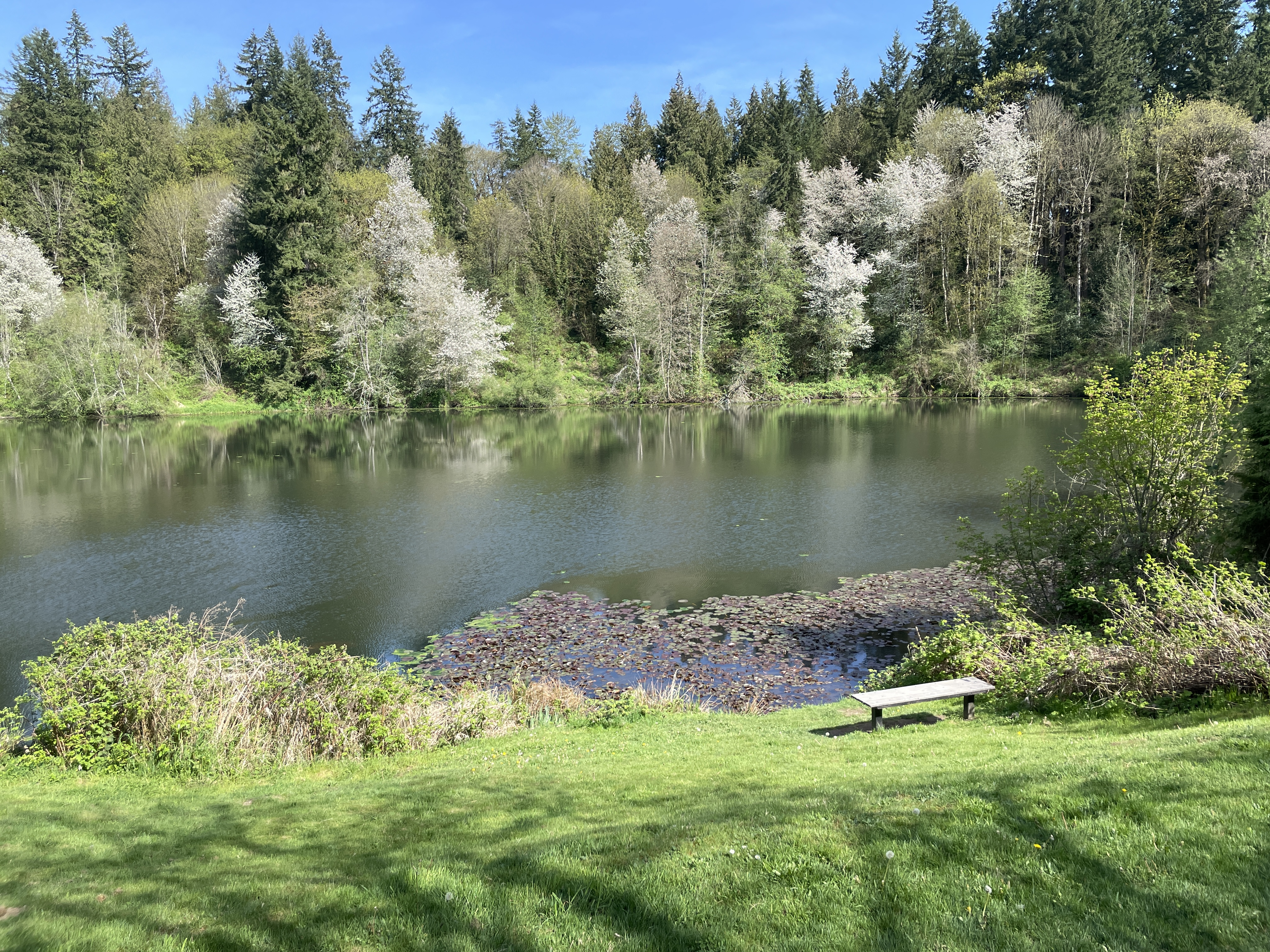
- View from Lake Rasmussen Park

- Location within Washington (state) Location within the United States
- Location: Duvall, Washington
- Coordinates: 47.7410544°N 121.9768297°W
- Basin countries: United States
- Surface elevation: 259 ft (79 m)

Lake Rasmussen is a small lake in Duvall, Washington, a city in King County. The lake is home to a small public park. It has suffered from infestation by invasive aquatic weeds.

== Description ==
Lake Rasmussen has a small public park on its western shore. The park includes picnic tables and wildlife viewing opportunities.

In 2021 an eight-year old discovered invasive Egeria densa in the lake. Egeria densa is a noxious aquatic weed that grows densely, depriving native species of habitat and oxygen. This weed had never been found in the local watershed before, and it is speculated to come from an aquarium that was dumped into the lake. Goldfish were also found, further confirming this hypothesis.

King County noted that Egeria was not yet widespread in the watershed when it was discovered, so herbicides were used to control the weed.
