= Duvall, Washington =

- City
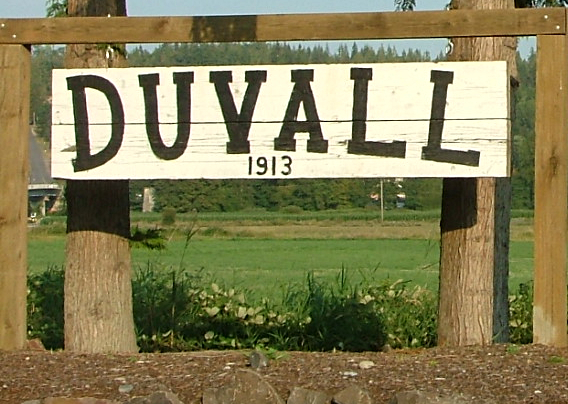
- Duvall welcome sign, pictured in 2004
- Motto: Small Town. Real Life.
- Interactive map of Duvall, Washington
- Coordinates: 47°44′46″N 121°58′35″W
- Country: United States
- State: Washington
- County: King
- Settled: 1875
- Platted: 1910
- Incorporated: January 6, 1913
- Named for: James Duvall or Francis Duvall

Government
  - Mayor: Amy McHenry

Area
  - Total: 2.47 sq mi (6.40 km^{2})
  - Land: 2.45 sq mi (6.35 km^{2})
  - Water: 0.019 sq mi (0.05 km^{2})
- Elevation: 404 ft (123 m)

Population (2020)
  - Total: 8,034
  - Estimate (2023): 8,517
  - Density: 3,475.7/sq mi (1,341.99/km^{2})
- Time zone: UTC–8 (Pacific (PST))
  - Summer (DST): UTC–7 (PDT)
- ZIP Code: 98019
- Area code: 425
- FIPS code: 53-19035
- GNIS feature ID: 2410377
- Website: duvallwa.gov

Duvall is a city in King County, Washington, United States, located on SR 203 halfway between Monroe and Carnation. The population was 8,034 at the 2020 census.

== History ==
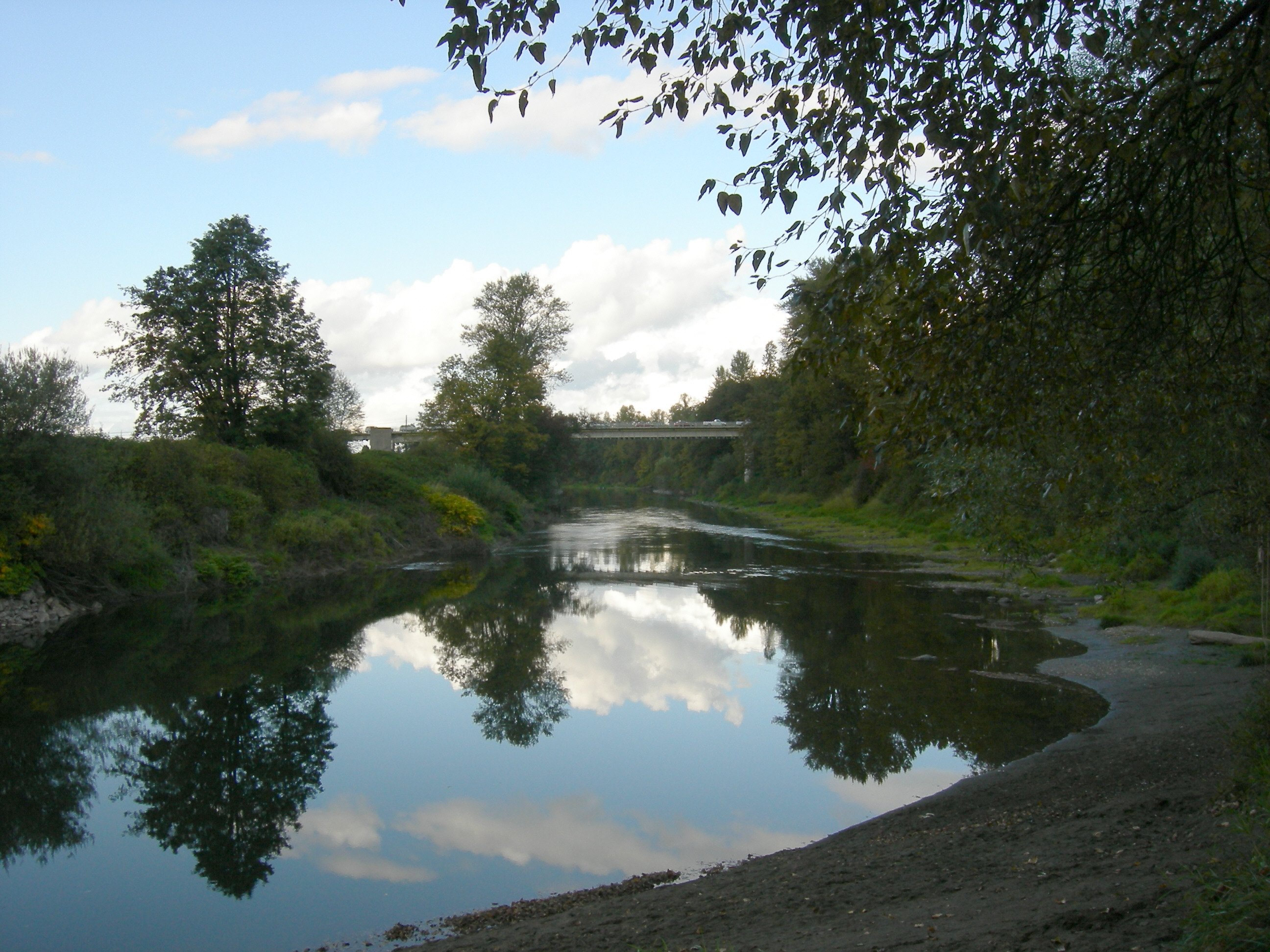
Bridge crossing the Snoqualmie River on the Woodinville-Duvall Road as it enters the center of Duvall (2007).

The area that became known as Duvall was historically the home of the Snoqualmie and other ancestral Tulalip Native American tribes. Following their relocation under the Treaty of Point Elliott, the area was homesteaded by veterans of the Civil War. The site of present-day Duvall was originally settled by Francis Duvall in 1871. His brother James later acquired the property, and the town was subsequently named in his honor.

An early milestone in the settlement of Duvall proper was the relocation of the town of Cherry Valley. Around 1909, the Chicago, Milwaukee and St. Paul Railroad agreed to move Cherry Valley homes and businesses to Duvall in order to continue the construction of a railroad line along the Snoqualmie River. The newly relocated town, briefly named Cosgrove after Samuel G. Cosgrove, underwent a real estate boom; streets and sidewalks were laid and a train depot was constructed. This was followed by construction of a movie house, a drug store, a new schoolhouse, and several hotels. By 1911, the Duvall Citizen began publishing regular editions of news events.

On April 28, 1968, nearly 3,000 fans attended a rock concert at a farm in Duvall where an upright piano was dropped from a helicopter. Performances included Country Joe and the Fish. This concert is well known to locals as the Piano Drop. This event inspired the Sky River Rock Festival which occurred later that year.

From 1990 to 1997, the city's population grew by 50 percent as it shifted into a bedroom community for job centers on the Eastside. Duvall experienced a great amount of construction during the period of 2008–2009 with the aim of making the one-road town center more accessible and presentable to tourists.

== Events ==
The year's largest and most popular event is the 'Duvall Days', which is held the first weekend in June in downtown Duvall, with other activities at nearby locations. Saturday events include a parade, street side vendors, live entertainment, and many games and activities for children. There is a car show called 'The Duvall Classic Car Show' held in the Duvall Safeway parking lot, and the 'Duvall Run' at McCormick Park with 10-kilometer and 5-kilometer races. 2017 and 2018 also included an evening fireworks display. On Sunday, the staff of Fire District 45 host their annual pancake breakfast at the downtown station.

Other events taking place in Duvall throughout the year include:

- Christi Irwin 'Community Easter Egg Hunt', McCormick Park (Saturday before Easter)
- Sandblast Festival of the Arts (third weekend in July)
- SummerStage (outdoor music, July)
- Christi Irwin 'Movies In The Park', McCormick Park (August)
- Tree Lighting (start of Christmas season)
- March of the Vegetables, a parade celebrating the vegetables and Art of Duvall

== Geography ==
According to the United States Census Bureau, the city has a total area of 2.47 square miles (6.40 km^{2}), of which, 2.45 square miles (6.35 km^{2}) is land and 0.02 square miles (0.05 km^{2}) is water.

Lake Rasmussen is located just east of downtown.

=== Climate ===
The climate in this area has mild differences between highs and lows, with adequate rainfall year-round. Due to its location relative to the Northern Cascades, the surrounding Snoqualmie Valley is subject to flooding from late fall to early spring. According to the Köppen Climate Classification system, Duvall has a marine west coast climate, abbreviated "Cfb" on climate maps.

== Demographics ==
Historical population
Census	Pop.	Note	%±
1920	258		—
1930	200		−22.5%
1940	234		17.0%
1950	236		0.9%
1960	345		46.2%
1970	607		75.9%
1980	729		20.1%
1990	2,770		280.0%
2000	4,616		66.6%
2010	6,695		45.0%
2020	8,034		20.0%
2023 (est.)	8,517		6.0%
U.S. Decennial Census; 2020 Census

=== Racial and ethnic composition ===
Duvall, Washington – racial and ethnic composition Note: the US Census treats Hispanic/Latino as an ethnic category. This table excludes Latinos from the racial categories and assigns them to a separate category. Hispanics/Latinos may be of any race.
Race / ethnicity (NH = non-Hispanic)	Pop. 2000	Pop. 2010	Pop. 2020	% 2000	% 2010	% 2020
White alone (NH)	4,218	5,725	5,965	91.38%	85.51%	74.25%
Black or African American alone (NH)	21	25	76	0.45%	0.37%	0.95%
Native American or Alaska Native alone (NH)	17	24	31	0.37%	0.36%	0.39%
Asian alone (NH)	90	171	453	1.95%	2.55%	5.64%
Pacific Islander alone (NH)	2	2	0	0.04%	0.03%	0.00%
Other race alone (NH)	3	14	36	0.06%	0.21%	0.45%
Mixed race or multiracial (NH)	93	221	512	2.01%	3.30%	6.37%
Hispanic or Latino (any race)	172	513	961	3.73%	7.66%	11.96%
Total	4,616	6,695	8,034	100.00%	100.00%	100.00%

=== 2020 census ===
As of the 2020 census, there were 8,034 people, 2,702 households, and 2,222 families in the city. The population density was 3,277.8 inhabitants per square mile (1,265.6/km^{2}). There were 2,778 housing units at an average density of 1,133.4 per square mile (437.6/km^{2}).

The median age was 37.3 years. 29.2% of residents were under the age of 18 and 7.7% of residents were 65 years of age or older. For every 100 females there were 99.4 males, and for every 100 females age 18 and over there were 97.4 males age 18 and over.

There were 2,702 households in Duvall, of which 48.1% had children under the age of 18 living in them. Of all households, 70.4% were married-couple households, 10.5% were households with a male householder and no spouse or partner present, and 14.5% were households with a female householder and no spouse or partner present. About 13.3% of all households were made up of individuals and 3.9% had someone living alone who was 65 years of age or older.

Of those housing units, 2.7% were vacant. The homeowner vacancy rate was 0.9% and the rental vacancy rate was 2.1%.

99.4% of residents lived in urban areas, while 0.6% lived in rural areas.

Racial composition as of the 2020 census
Race	Number	Percent
White	6,141	76.4%
Black or African American	76	0.9%
American Indian and Alaska Native	63	0.8%
Asian	454	5.7%
Native Hawaiian and Other Pacific Islander	0	0.0%
Some other race	423	5.3%
Two or more races	877	10.9%
Hispanic or Latino (of any race)	961	12.0%

=== 2010 census ===
As of the 2010 census, there were 6,695 people, 2,224 households, and 1,816 families residing in the city. The population density was 2,713.8 inhabitants per square mile (1,047.8/km^{2}). There were 2,315 housing units at an average density of 937.2 per square mile (361.9/km^{2}). The racial makeup of the city was 89.7% White, 0.4% African American, 0.5% Native American, 2.7% Asian, 2.9% from other races, and 3.8% from two or more races. Hispanic or Latino people of any race were 7.7% of the population.

There were 2,224 households, of which 52.3% had children under the age of 18 living with them, 70.2% were married couples living together, 8.0% had a female householder with no husband present, 3.4% had a male householder with no wife present, and 18.3% were non-families. 14.4% of all households were made up of individuals, and 2.8% had someone living alone who was 65 years of age or older. The average household size was 2.99 and the average family size was 3.33.

The median age in the city was 34.4 years. 33.8% of residents were under the age of 18; 4.8% were between the ages of 18 and 24; 33.2% were from 25 to 44; 23.7% were from 45 to 64; and 4.5% were 65 years of age or older. The gender makeup of the city was 49.5% male and 50.5% female.

== Government and politics ==
Duvall leans heavily Democratic like King County as a whole, having cast more than two-thirds of its votes for Joe Biden in the 2020 presidential election.

Presidential election results
Year	Republican	Democratic	Third Parties
2020	28.95% 1,331	67.01% 3,081	4.05% 186

== Education ==
The city is served by the Riverview School District. Its sole comprehensive high school is Cedarcrest High School.

== Notable people ==
- Robert A. Funk, businessman
- Amy Tryon, equestrian
- Martha Wright, actress
