= Lake Marcel-Stillwater, Washington =

- Census-designated place
- Location of Lake Marcel-Stillwater, Washington
- Coordinates: 47°41′33″N 121°54′54″W
- Country: United States
- State: Washington
- County: King

Area
  - Total: 1.33 sq mi (3.45 km^{2})
  - Land: 1.27 sq mi (3.30 km^{2})
  - Water: 0.058 sq mi (0.15 km^{2})
- Elevation: 289 ft (88 m)

Population (2020)
  - Total: 1,334
  - Density: 1,050/sq mi (404/km^{2})
- Time zone: UTC-8 (Pacific (PST))
  - Summer (DST): UTC-7 (PDT)
- FIPS code: 53-37538
- GNIS feature ID: 2408542

Lake Marcel-Stillwater is a census-designated place (CDP) in King County, Washington, United States. The population was 1,334 at the 2020 census.

== Geography ==
The CDP is located in northern King County. The namesake lake is in the center of the CDP, and the original settlement of Stillwater is in the south along State Route 203, on the northern edge of the Snoqualmie River bottomlands. The CDP is 11 miles (18 km) east of Redmond and 28 miles (45 km) east of downtown Seattle.

According to the United States Census Bureau, the CDP has a total area of 1.33 square miles (3.45 km^{2}), of which 1.27 square miles (3.30 km^{2}) are land and 0.058 square miles (0.15 km^{2}), or 4.27%, are water.

== Demographics ==
Historical population
Census	Pop.	Note	%±
2000	1,381		—
2010	1,277		−7.5%
2020	1,334		4.5%
U.S. Decennial Census; 1990 2000 2010

Lake Marcel-Stillwater first appeared as a census designated place in the 2000 U.S. census.

=== Racial and ethnic composition ===
Lake Marcel-Stillwater CDP, Washington – Racial and ethnic composition Note: the US Census treats Hispanic/Latino as an ethnic category. This table excludes Latinos from the racial categories and assigns them to a separate category. Hispanics/Latinos may be of any race.
Race / Ethnicity (NH = Non-Hispanic)	Pop 2000	Pop 2010	Pop 2020	% 2000	% 2010	% 2020
White alone (NH)	1,285	1,151	1,129	93.05%	90.13%	84.63%
Black or African American alone (NH)	3	2	2	0.22%	0.16%	0.15%
Native American or Alaska Native alone (NH)	3	9	6	0.22%	0.70%	0.45%
Asian alone (NH)	8	11	20	0.58%	0.86%	1.50%
Native Hawaiian or Pacific Islander alone (NH)	1	1	1	0.07%	0.08%	0.07%
Other race alone (NH)	3	0	6	0.22%	0.00%	0.45%
Mixed race or Multiracial (NH)	24	26	95	1.74%	2.04%	7.12%
Hispanic or Latino (any race)	54	77	75	3.91%	6.03%	5.62%
Total	1,381	1,277	1,334	100.00%	100.00%	100.00%

=== 2000 census ===
At the 2000 census there were 1,381 people, 441 households, and 381 families in the CDP. The population density was 1,071.5 people per square mile (413.3/km^{2}). There were 453 housing units at an average density of 351.5/sq mi (135.6/km^{2}). The racial makeup of the CDP was 94.71% White, 0.22% African American, 0.36% Native American, 0.58% Asian, 0.07% Pacific Islander, 1.59% from other races, and 2.46% from two or more races. Hispanic or Latino of any race were 3.91%.

Of the 441 households 56.7% had children under the age of 18 living with them, 78.0% were married couples living together, 5.2% had a female householder with no husband present, and 13.6% were non-families. 9.5% of households were one person and 1.4% were one person aged 65 or older. The average household size was 3.13 and the average family size was 3.34.

The age distribution was 35.4% under the age of 18, 5.0% from 18 to 24, 39.0% from 25 to 44, 17.6% from 45 to 64, and 3.0% 65 or older. The median age was 33 years. For every 100 females there were 108.3 males. For every 100 females age 18 and over, there were 107.0 males.

The median household income was $61,250 and the median family income was $61,400. Males had a median income of $48,750 versus $39,306 for females. The per capita income for the CDP was $23,005. None of the families and 0.5% of the population were living below the poverty line, including no under eighteens and none of those over 64.

== Education ==
It is in the Riverview School District. Its sole comprehensive high school is Cedarcrest High School.
