= Langlois Lake =

Lake in King County, Washington

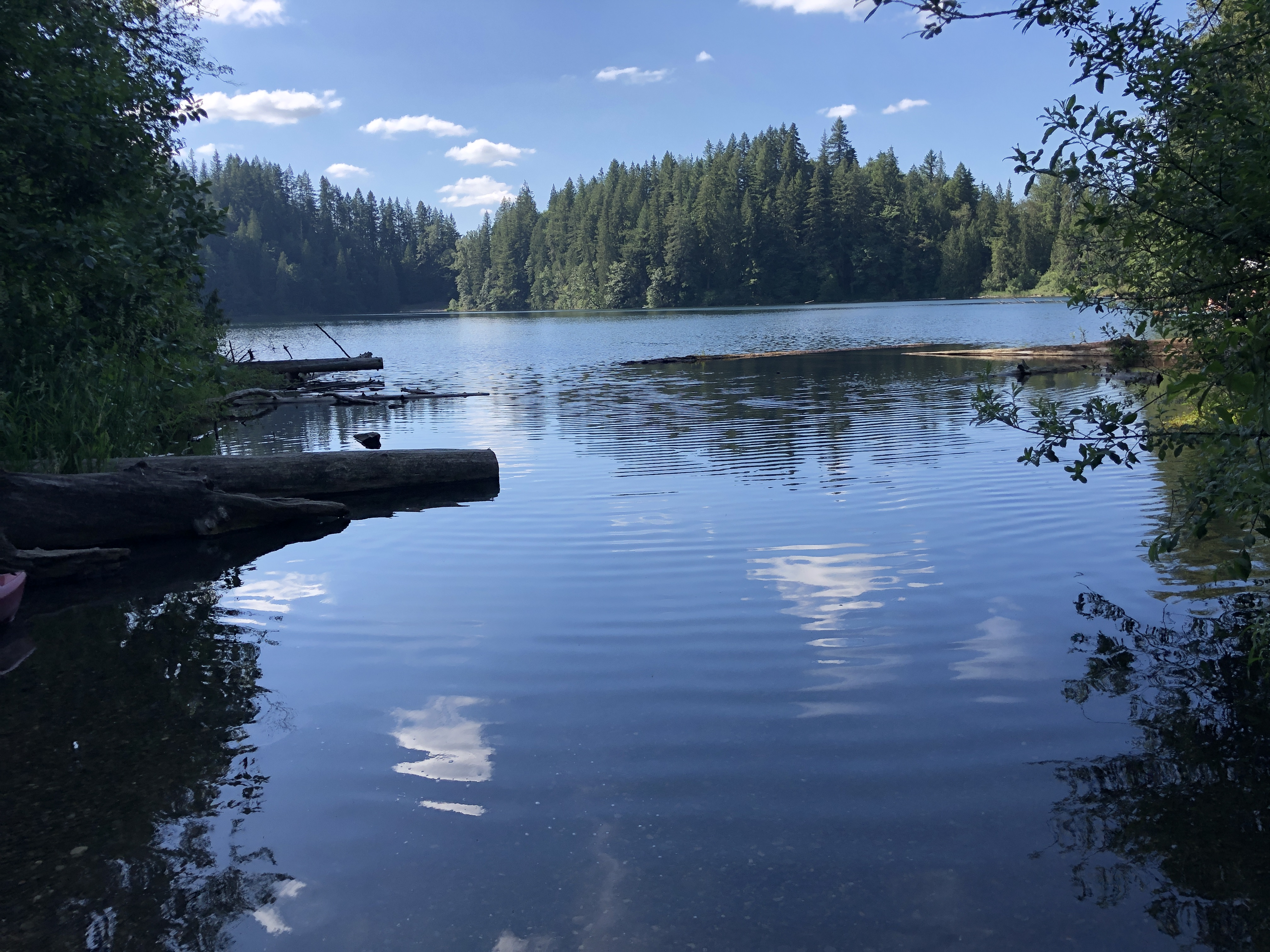
- View across Langlois Lake from the public gravel beach

- Location within Washington (state) Location within the United States
- Location: King County, Washington
- Coordinates: 47.63744789613728°N 121.88896495996586°W
- Basin countries: United States
- Surface area: 39.00 acres (15.78 ha)
- Max. depth: 98 ft (30 m)
- Surface elevation: 138 ft (42 m)

Langlois Lake is located in King County, Washington, just outside the city of Carnation.

== Description ==
Langlois Lake enjoys excellent water quality. Nutrient and algae concentrations are low, and the lake is classified as oligotrophic. Long-term trends based on data collected since 2001 indicate that water quality is further improving over time. Langlois Lake has a 226-acre (91 ha) mostly forested watershed, primarily encompassing areas to the east of the lake.

Fishing is a popular activity in the lake. The Washington State Department of Fish and Wildlife provides access to the lake through a public gravel beach, and stocks the lake with kokanee and rainbow trout. Largemouth bass are also naturally present. Langlois Lake is one of only ten lakes in King County that has a seasonal fishing closure.
