= Tolt River =

River in Washington, U.S.

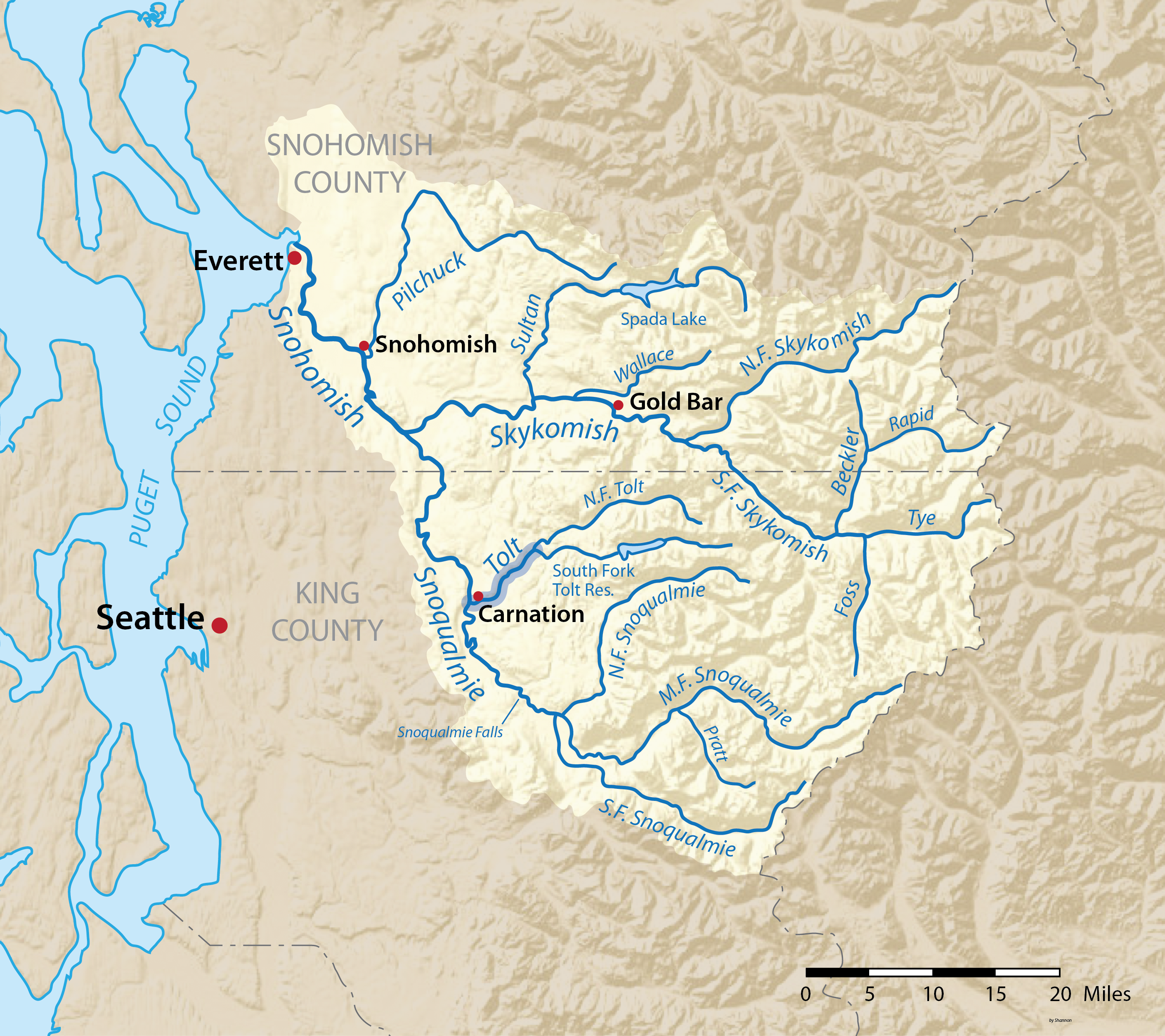
- Map of the Tolt River highlighted in the Snohomish River watershed

Location
- Country: United States
- State: Washington
- County: King

Physical characteristics
- Source: North Fork Tolt River
  - coordinates: 47°41′44″N 121°49′14″W
- Mouth: Snoqualmie River
  - coordinates: 47°38′24″N 121°55′25″W
- Discharge
  - location: USGS gage 12148500, near Carnation, WA
  - average: 572 cu ft/s (16.2 m^{3}/s)
  - minimum: 53 cu ft/s (1.5 m^{3}/s)
  - maximum: 11,400 cu ft/s (320 m^{3}/s)

The Tolt River is located in the western foothills of the Cascade Mountains in north central King County in the U.S. state of Washington. The river begins at the confluence of the North Fork Tolt and South Fork Tolt rivers. It flows southwest joining the Snoqualmie River near Carnation, Washington. The Tolt River watershed is part of the larger Snohomish River and Puget Sound drainage basin.

The South Fork Tolt watershed provides ~30% of the drinking water for Seattle area residents.

== Name origin ==
The name Tolt comes from the Lushootseed village name tultxʷ or tulq.

== See also ==
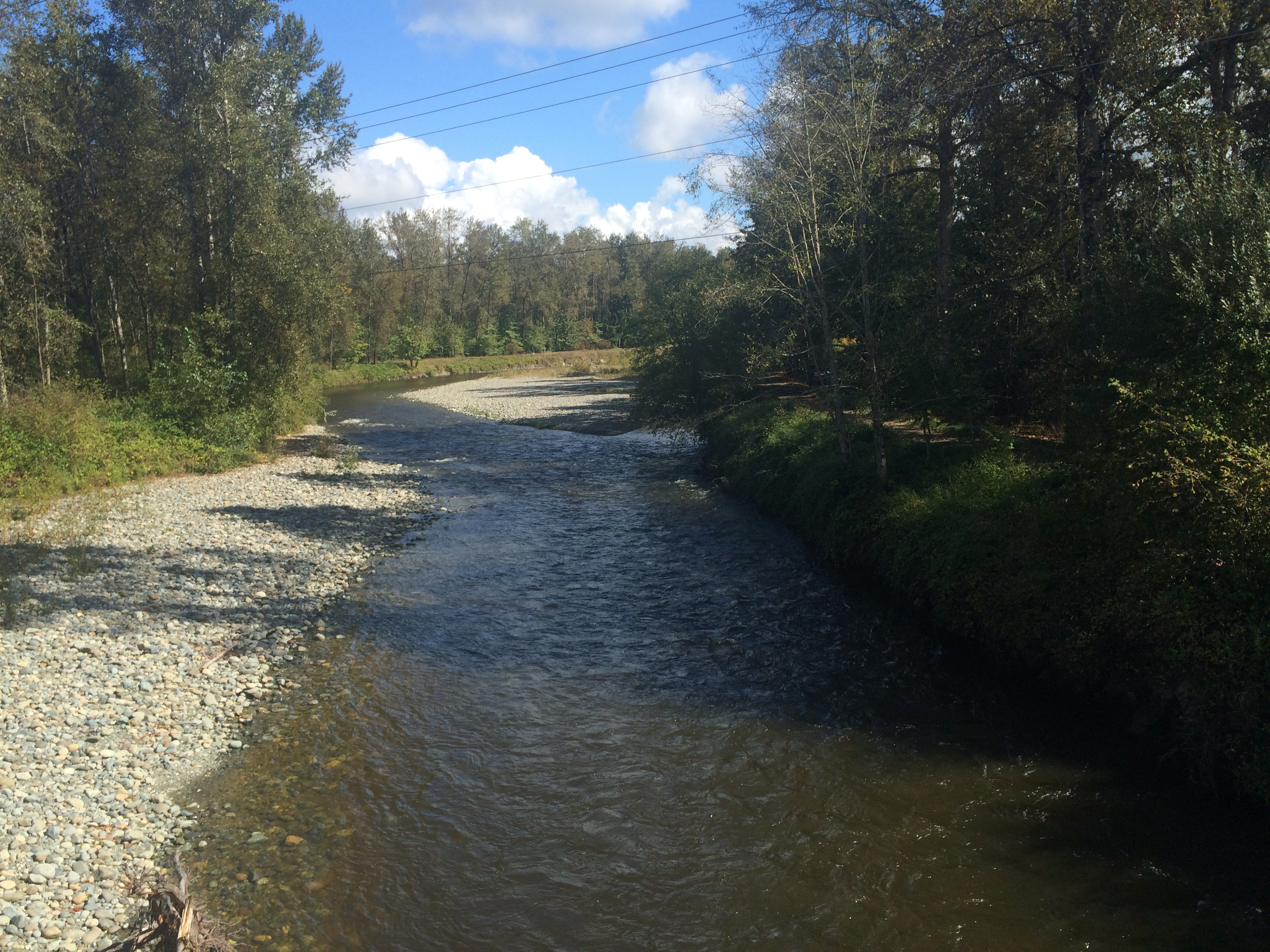
The Tolt River, from the trail bridge over it in Tolt MacDonald Park, in Carnation, Washington

- List of rivers of Washington (state)
