= Riverview School District (Washington) =

School district in Washington, United States

Address
- 15510 1st Avenue N.E. Duvall, Washington, 98019; United States

District information
- Type: Public
- Motto: Building Bridges to the Future
- Grades: K-12
- Established: 1986; 39 years ago
- Superintendent: Dr. Susan Leach
- Schools: 6
- NCES District ID: 5304560

Students and staff
- Students: 3,105 (2020-2021)
- Student–teacher ratio: 17.01

Other information
- Website: rsd407.org

Riverview School District No. 407 is a public school district in King County, Washington, USA and contains within its boundaries, the communities of Duvall, Carnation, and the surrounding areas. At the end of the 2021-2022 school year, the district's enrollment was 3,065 students.

== District boundary ==
It includes Carnation, Duvall, Lake Marcel-Stillwater, and portions of Ames Lake, Cottage Lake, and Union Hill-Novelty Hill.

== Schools ==
- Cedarcrest High School
- Tolt Middle School
- Cherry Valley Elementary School
- Stillwater Elementary School
- Carnation Elementary School
- Riverview Learning Center (PARADE, CLIP, CHOICE)

== History ==
In 1988, Tolt Junior/Senior High School split into Tolt Middle School and Tolt High School. The high school later closed when its replacement, Cedarcrest High School, opened in 1993. Tolt Middle School is still located on the original Tolt Junior/Senior High School campus.
