= Camlann Medieval Village =

British living museum

Coordinates: 47.689°N 121.905°W

Camlann Medieval Village is a living history museum which recreates rural life in England in 1376, located in Carnation, Washington; it is run by the Camlann Medieval Association, a 501(c)(3) nonprofit educational corporation founded in 1981.

== Bors Hede Inne ==
The Bors Hede Inne is a dinner theater restaurant, open year round by reservation. The food is prepared from recipes found in historical medieval cookbooks, and served by in-character interpreters. The Bors Hede is patterned after an actual late medieval inn, which would expect to serve the well-to-do. Upon arrival, guests are provided with Borde knives and spoons, and genteel laving (handwashing) before being presented with a trencher, a flat half of bread, which serves as a plate. Throughout the meal they are periodically visited by a minstrel who plays songs appropriate to the period.

== Feasts ==
Public feasts are held throughout the year in the inn's undercroft feast hall, on occasions such as Lent or St. George's Day. These feasts are two or three courses, with about six dishes per course. Feast also feature songs from the minstrel, or other entertainment appropriate to the feast's particular theme.

== Internal activities ==
The village is open each weekend from May to the end of September. Visitors may explore the buildings and speak with volunteers playing the part of villagers going about their daily tasks such as cooking, dyeing, practicing archery, or daubing homes. Others perform various crafts such as blacksmithing, carpentry or sewing. They are trained to speak from an authentic point of view, about their personal histories and local events.

On festival days, regular villagers are joined by minstrels, puppeteers, magicians or armored knights.

== See also ==
- Battle of Camlann
