= Cottage Lake, Washington =

- Census-designated place
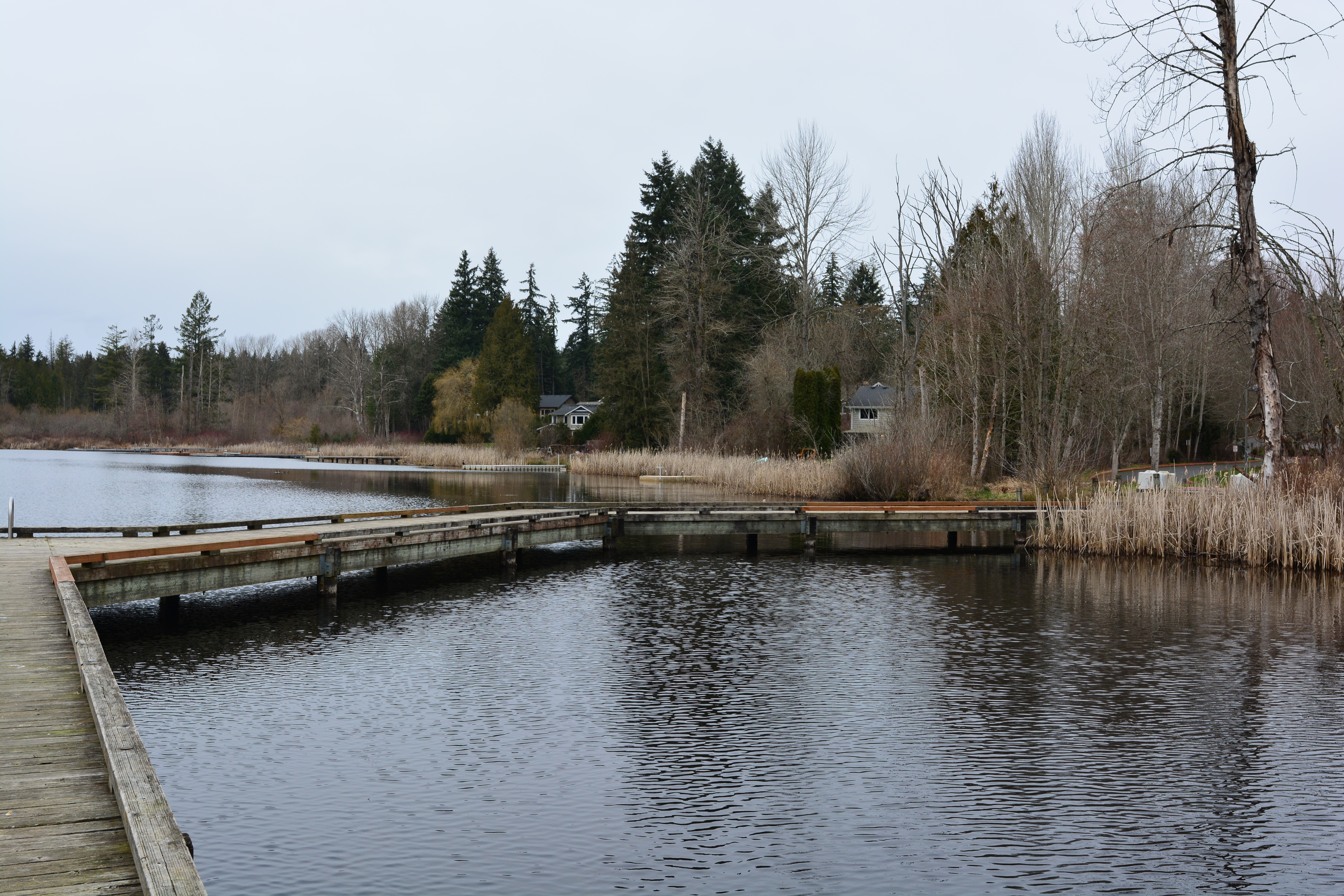
- Cottage Lake Park

- Location of Cottage Lake, Washington
- Coordinates: 47°45′05″N 122°06′32″W
- Country: United States
- State: Washington
- County: King

Area
  - Total: 22.8 sq mi (59.0 km^{2})
  - Land: 22.7 sq mi (58.7 km^{2})
  - Water: 0.12 sq mi (0.3 km^{2})
- Elevation: 305 ft (93 m)

Population (2020)
  - Total: 22,857
  - Density: 993/sq mi (383.3/km^{2})
- Time zone: UTC-8 (Pacific (PST))
  - Summer (DST): UTC-7 (PDT)
- ZIP code: 98072, 98077
- Area code: 425
- FIPS code: 53-14940
- GNIS feature ID: 2407667

Cottage Lake is a census-designated place (CDP) in King County, Washington, United States. The population was 22,857 at the 2020 census. The lake itself falls within the 98072 ZIP code, while the developments east of the lake fall under the 98077 ZIP code. The census designated area is also split between the Northshore school district and the Lake Washington school district.

Based on per capita income, Cottage Lake ranks 13th of 522 areas in the state of Washington to be ranked. Coldwell Banker ranked Cottage Lake #1 in 2013 for the fastest growing suburb in America.

== Geography ==
Cottage Lake is located in northern King County and is bordered on the east by West Snoqualmie Valley Road, to the south by the Union Hill-Novelty Hill CDP, to the west by State Route 202 and the city of Woodinville, and to the north by the CDPs of Maltby and High Bridge in Snohomish County. It is 6 miles (10 km) northeast of Redmond and 20 miles (32 km) southeast of Everett.

According to the United States Census Bureau, the Cottage Lake CDP has a total area of 22.8 square miles (59.0 km^{2}), of which 22.7 square miles (58.7 km^{2}) are land and 0.1 square miles (0.3 km^{2}), or 0.55%, are water. Most of the CDP drains south and west to the Sammamish River, while the eastern edge drains to the Snoqualmie River.

== Demographics ==
Historical population
Census	Pop.	Note	%±
2000	24,330		—
2010	22,494		−7.5%
2020	22,857		1.6%
U.S. Decennial Census; 1990 2000 2010

Cottage Lake first appeared as a census designated place in the 2000 U.S. census formed out of the portion of the deleted Woodinville CDP that was not incorporated into the city of Woodinville.

=== Racial and ethnic composition ===
Cottage Lake CDP, Washington – Racial and ethnic composition Note: the US Census treats Hispanic/Latino as an ethnic category. This table excludes Latinos from the racial categories and assigns them to a separate category. Hispanics/Latinos may be of any race.
Race / Ethnicity (NH = Non-Hispanic)	Pop 2000	Pop 2010	Pop 2020	% 2000	% 2010	% 2020
White alone (NH)	21,792	19,515	17,547	89.57%	86.76%	76.77%
Black or African American alone (NH)	152	156	184	0.62%	0.69%	0.81%
Native American or Alaska Native alone (NH)	80	77	37	0.33%	0.34%	0.16%
Asian alone (NH)	915	1,172	2,122	3.76%	5.21%	9.28%
Native Hawaiian or Pacific Islander alone (NH)	42	31	23	0.17%	0.14%	0.10%
Other race alone (NH)	80	49	147	0.33%	0.22%	0.64%
Mixed race or Multiracial (NH)	548	694	1,690	2.25%	3.09%	7.39%
Hispanic or Latino (any race)	721	800	1,107	2.96%	3.56%	4.84%
Total	24,330	22,494	22,857	100.00%	100.00%	100.00%

=== 2020 census ===
As of the 2020 census, Cottage Lake had a population of 22,857. The median age was 43.9 years. 24.4% of residents were under the age of 18 and 16.4% of residents were 65 years of age or older. For every 100 females there were 101.8 males, and for every 100 females age 18 and over there were 99.7 males age 18 and over.

96.6% of residents lived in urban areas, while 3.4% lived in rural areas.

There were 7,764 households in Cottage Lake, of which 38.0% had children under the age of 18 living in them. Of all households, 76.9% were married-couple households, 8.1% were households with a male householder and no spouse or partner present, and 11.0% were households with a female householder and no spouse or partner present. About 10.8% of all households were made up of individuals and 5.1% had someone living alone who was 65 years of age or older.

There were 7,976 housing units, of which 2.7% were vacant. The homeowner vacancy rate was 0.6% and the rental vacancy rate was 3.3%.

Racial composition as of the 2020 census
Race	Number	Percent
White	17,796	77.9%
Black or African American	187	0.8%
American Indian and Alaska Native	70	0.3%
Asian	2,141	9.4%
Native Hawaiian and Other Pacific Islander	28	0.1%
Some other race	334	1.5%
Two or more races	2,301	10.1%

=== 2000 census ===
At the 2000 census there were 24,330 people in 7,772 households, including 6,800 families, in the CDP. The population density was 1,066.5 people per square mile (411.8/km^{2}). There were 7,916 housing units at an average density of 347.0/sq mi (134.0/km^{2}). The racial makeup of the CDP was 92.27% White, 0.34% Native American, 3.77% Asian, 0.18% Pacific Islander, 1.35% from other races, and 2.65% from two or more races. Hispanic or Latino of any race were 2.96%.

Of the 7,772 households 51.8% had children under the age of 18 living with them, 79.7% were married couples living together, 5.2% had a female householder with no husband present, and 12.5% were non-families. 9.3% of households were one person and 1.7% were one person aged 65 or older. The average household size was 3.13 and the average family size was 3.34 which far exceeds the U.S. average of 1.9.

The age distribution was 33.0% under the age of 18, 5.4% from 18 to 24, 28.3% from 25 to 44, 28.9% from 45 to 64, and 4.5% 65 or older. The median age was 37 years. For every 100 females there were 101.3 males. For every 100 females age 18 and over, there were 101.5 males.

=== 2007 estimate ===
According to a 2007 estimate, the median household income was $131,565, and the median family income was $136,568. Males had a median income of $71,276 versus $40,935 for females. The per capita income for the CDP was $39,763. About 2.1% of families and 2.7% of the population were below the poverty line, including 3.5% of those under age 18 and 3.3% of those age 65 or over.

== Education ==
Most of Cottage Lake is in the Northshore School District. Other portions are in the Lake Washington School District and the Riverview School District.
