= Carnation (brand) =

Brand of evaporated milk and other products

- Product type: Canned milk products
- Current owner: Nestlé (F&N in Malaysia, Singapore, Brunei and Thailand)
- Country: United States
- Introduced: 1899; 127 years ago
- Markets: Worldwide
- Website: www.nestle.com

Carnation is a brand of food products. The brand was especially known for its evaporated milk product created in 1899, then called Carnation Sterilized Cream and later called Carnation Evaporated Milk. The brand has since been used for other related products including milk-flavoring mixes, flavored beverages, flavor syrups, hot cocoa mixes, instant breakfasts, corn flakes, ice cream novelties, and dog food. Nestlé acquired the Carnation Company in 1985.

== History ==
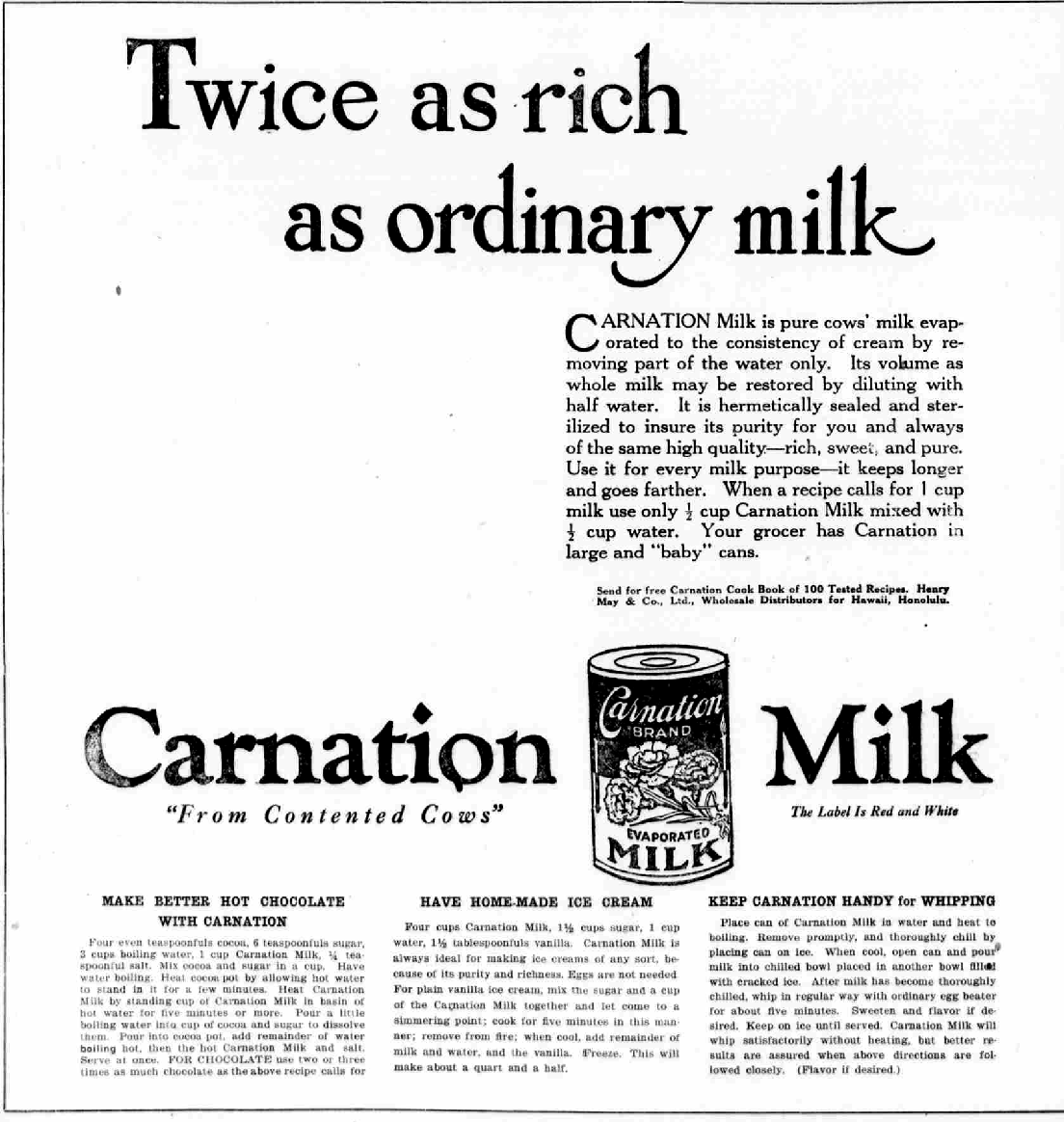
Newspaper ad for Carnation Evaporated Milk, 1921

Carnation was founded as an evaporated milk company, but demand decreased with the increasing availability of home refrigeration throughout the 20th century. Carnation diversified its product portfolio after the 1950s and was acquired by Nestlé in 1984 for $3 billion ($9,296,925,048 in 2025 dollars).

=== Elbridge Amos Stuart ===
Elbridge Amos Stuart (born September 10, 1856, in Guilford County, North Carolina; died January 14, 1944, in Los Angeles, California) was an American milk industrialist and creator of Carnation evaporated milk and its famous slogan, that it came from "Contented Cows".

On September 6, 1899, Stuart and a business partner founded the Pacific Coast Condensed Milk Company in Kent, Washington, and he became its first president (a post he held until 1932, then serving as chairman from 1932 to 1944). Its product was based on the relatively new process of commercial evaporation of beverages. Stuart believed that there was value in sanitary milk at a time when fresh milk was neither universally available nor always drinkable, and correctly believed that his product would join other staples on grocers' shelves.

In 1901, his partner sold out, leaving Stuart the company and $105,000 of debt ($4,063,500 in 2025 dollars). As sales gradually grew, Stuart sought a brand name for the product. Passing a tobacconist's window in downtown Seattle, Stuart saw a display of cigars around a sign with the name: Carnation. His own firm subsequently adopted the name Carnation Evaporated Milk Company.

One of the most important things Stuart had learned on his father's farm was that high-quality milk came from healthy cows; so to ensure premium standards, he distributed pure bred bulls to the farmers supplying the factory, whose offspring were selected for milk productivity. Eventually, Stuart established a breeding farm, named Carnation Farm, where the application of new principles of husbandry continually improved the productivity of the herd. Carnation cows held the world milk production record for 32 consecutive years. One cow in particular, Segis Pietertje Prospect, produced 37,381 pints of milk during 1920, and a statue of the cow was erected to honor this record. The town of Tolt, Washington, was later renamed Carnation, after the nearby breeding and research farms.

=== Advertising ===
In 1907, the promotional phrase "Carnation Condensed Milk, the milk from contented cows" was introduced. This slogan referred to the higher quality milk from happy cows grazing in the lush Pacific Northwest. Carnation used this slogan for decades, and it spawned a radio variety program entitled "The Contented Hour," which featured entertainers such as Dinah Shore, Jane Powell and Burns and Allen. The George Burns and Gracie Allen Show, which premiered on CBS television in 1950, was sponsored by Carnation. As was common during that era, instead of cutting to filmed commercials, Burns, Allen and guests broke the "fourth wall" to tout Carnation products in a comedic, often tongue-in-cheek way during the show.

In the late 1940s, Carnation Milk sponsored the Tigners, Black fraternal quadruplets, who were born in 1946, as a form of advertising.

Since the 1960s, labels of cans of Carnation Condensed Milk have contained recipes on the inner side.

=== Rhymes ===
During the twentieth century, Carnation Evaporated Milk became the subject of humorous, satirical rhymes. One example that may date back to the year 1900 is as follows: Carnation Milk is the best in the land / Here I sit with a can in my hand / No tits to pull, no hay to pitch / You just punch a hole in the son of a bitch. This quatrain, or a variant of it, has often been portrayed by storytellers as the result of a slogan contest or advertising contest sponsored by the Carnation Company, although such a contest never actually occurred.

=== Current status ===
The site of the original Carnation Farms is located 27 miles east of downtown Seattle, in Carnation, Washington.

In 2006, Nestlé sold the liquid milk business within Malaysia, Singapore, Brunei and Thailand, including the Carnation brand to F&N.

In the Philippines, in 2007, under a separate agreement with Alaska Milk Corporation (the Philippine subsidiary of FrieslandCampina), Nestlé provided Alaska the long-term license to manufacture and sell Carnation Evaporated Creamer, Carnation Condensada and Milkmaid Sweetened Condensed Milk, under the Nestlé quality guidelines in the Philippines. This trademark license lasted for 14 years until 2021 as Nestlé Philippines reacquired the trademark licenses for the Carnation and Milkmaid brands.

In 2008, Carnation Farms became Camp Korey, part of the Hole in the Wall Camps founded by Paul Newman. Camp Korey is a medically supervised camp staffed with physicians and nurses, and trained camp counsellors for children living with serious and life-threatening illness. The camp provides a week-long experience of camp programs and activities for children ages 7–16 at no cost to them. In 2016, Camp Korey moved from Carnation Farm to property purchased in Skagit County, and the Stuart family, who bought back the farm from Nestle, is developing new programs and activities for the farm.

== Products ==
- Carnation Evaporated Milk – introduced in 1899
- Carnation Malted Milk – introduced in 1927
- Carnation Instant Breakfast (Breakfast Essentials) – introduced in 1964

== Carnation Ice Cream Restaurants ==
Carnation Ice Cream Restaurants were located in Oklahoma, California, and Texas.

The Carnation Café is a fast casual restaurant in Disneyland and other Disney parks, originally "Carnation Ice Cream Parlor and Restaurant presented by Carnation" (original attraction from the park's opening in 1955).

== In popular culture ==
For the scene in the 1975 film Jaws in which the character Ben Gardner's corpse pops out from his stationary boat, director Steven Spielberg re-shot the scene in the swimming pool of editor Verna Fields. Spielberg poured Carnation's powdered milk into the pool in order to simulate the murky waters of Martha's Vineyard where the scene was originally shot.

Elbridge Amos Stuart is immortalized in folk musician John Stewart's 1969 song "Mother Country".

A Carnation Milk truck is shown briefly in a scene in Once Upon a Time in Hollywood. In another scene, Brad Pitt's character is drinking from a Carnation Milk carton.

Carnation are shown as potential clients of Sterling Cooper & Partners in the Season 6 episode of Mad Men, "A Tale of Two Cities."

== See also ==
- Carnation, Washington
- Condensed milk – a different type of preserved milk
- Eagle Family Foods Incorporated – a rival company
- Ovaltine – a rival brand also owned by Nestlé
- Pet, Inc. – another rival
- List of chocolate beverages
- List of dairy product companies in the United States
