= Ames Lake, Washington =

- Census-designated place
- Location of Ames Lake, Washington
- Coordinates: 47°37′44″N 121°58′04″W
- Country: United States
- State: Washington
- County: King

Area
  - Total: 1.72 sq mi (4.45 km^{2})
  - Land: 1.60 sq mi (4.14 km^{2})
  - Water: 0.12 sq mi (0.31 km^{2})
- Elevation: 364 ft (111 m)

Population (2020)
  - Total: 1,524
  - Density: 929/sq mi (358.7/km^{2})
- Time zone: UTC-8 (Pacific (PST))
  - Summer (DST): UTC-7 (PDT)
- ZIP code: 98053
- Area code: 425
- FIPS code: 53-01920
- GNIS feature ID: 2407739

Ames Lake is an unincorporated community and census-designated place (CDP) in King County, Washington, United States. The population was 1,524 at the 2020 census, up from 1,486 at the 2010 census.

Based on per capita income, Ames Lake ranks 10th of 522 areas in the state of Washington to be ranked.

== Geography ==
Ames Lake is located in northern King County and surrounds a lake of the same name. It is 8 miles (13 km) southeast of Redmond, 5 miles (8 km) northeast of Sammamish, and 23 miles (37 km) east of downtown Seattle.

According to the United States Census Bureau, the Ames Lake CDP has a total area of 1.72 square miles (4.45 km^{2}), of which 1.60 square miles (4.14 km^{2}) are land and 0.12 square miles (0.31 km^{2}), or 6.98%, are water.

== Demographics ==
Historical population
| Census | Pop. | Note | %± |
|---|---|---|---|
| 2000 | 1,435 | | — |
| 2010 | 1,486 | | 3.6% |
| 2020 | 1,524 | | 2.6% |
U.S. Decennial Census; 1990 2000 2010

Ames Lake first appeared as a census designated place in the 2000 U.S. census.

=== Racial and ethnic composition ===
Ames Lake CDP, Washington – Racial and ethnic composition Note: the US Census treats Hispanic/Latino as an ethnic category. This table excludes Latinos from the racial categories and assigns them to a separate category. Hispanics/Latinos may be of any race.
| Race / Ethnicity (NH = Non-Hispanic) | Pop 2000 | Pop 2010 | Pop 2020 | % 2000 | % 2010 | % 2020 |
|---|---|---|---|---|---|---|
| White alone (NH) | 1,316 | 1,313 | 1,183 | 91.71% | 88.36% | 77.62% |
| Black or African American alone (NH) | 1 | 6 | 12 | 0.07% | 0.40% | 0.79% |
| Native American or Alaska Native alone (NH) | 3 | 4 | 5 | 0.21% | 0.27% | 0.33% |
| Asian alone (NH) | 58 | 65 | 123 | 4.04% | 4.37% | 8.07% |
| Native Hawaiian or Pacific Islander alone (NH) | 2 | 3 | 5 | 0.14% | 0.20% | 0.33% |
| Other race alone (NH) | 6 | 0 | 10 | 0.42% | 0.00% | 0.66% |
| Mixed race or Multiracial (NH) | 30 | 60 | 102 | 2.09% | 4.04% | 6.69% |
| Hispanic or Latino (any race) | 19 | 35 | 84 | 1.32% | 2.36% | 5.51% |
| Total | 1,435 | 1,486 | 1,524 | 100.00% | 100.00% | 100.00% |

=== 2020 census ===
As of the 2020 census, Ames Lake had a population of 1,524. The median age was 42.7 years. 21.9% of residents were under the age of 18 and 12.1% of residents were 65 years of age or older. For every 100 females there were 108.8 males, and for every 100 females age 18 and over there were 107.9 males age 18 and over.

0.0% of residents lived in urban areas, while 100.0% lived in rural areas.

There were 574 households in Ames Lake, of which 32.9% had children under the age of 18 living in them. Of all households, 73.3% were married-couple households, 9.1% were households with a male householder and no spouse or partner present, and 12.2% were households with a female householder and no spouse or partner present. About 15.1% of all households were made up of individuals and 5.4% had someone living alone who was 65 years of age or older.

There were 599 housing units, of which 4.2% were vacant. The homeowner vacancy rate was 0.0% and the rental vacancy rate was 0.0%.

Racial composition as of the 2020 census
| Race | Number | Percent |
|---|---|---|
| White | 1,213 | 79.6% |
| Black or African American | 12 | 0.8% |
| American Indian and Alaska Native | 5 | 0.3% |
| Asian | 125 | 8.2% |
| Native Hawaiian and Other Pacific Islander | 7 | 0.5% |
| Some other race | 17 | 1.1% |
| Two or more races | 145 | 9.5% |

=== 2000 census ===
As of the 2000 census, there were 1,435 people, 514 households, and 418 families residing in the CDP. The population density was 854.0 people per square mile (329.8/km^{2}). There were 533 housing units at an average density of 317.2/sq mi (122.5/km^{2}). The racial makeup of the CDP was 92.89% White, 0.07% African American, 0.21% Native American, 4.11% Asian, 0.14% Pacific Islander, 0.42% from other races, and 2.16% from two or more races. Hispanic or Latino of any race were 1.32% of the population.

There were 514 households, out of which 43.0% had children under the age of 18 living with them. 73.0% were married couples living together; 4.5% had a female householder with no husband present; and 18.5% were non-families. 12.3% of all households were made up of individuals, and 1.0% had someone living alone who was 65 years of age or older. The average household size was 2.79 and the average family size was 3.06.

In the CDP, the population was spread out, with 28.5% under the age of 18, 5.4% from 18 to 24, 39.1% from 25 to 44, 23.4% from 45 to 64, and 3.6% who were 65 years of age or older. The median age was 36 years. For every 100 females, there were 102.7 males. For every 100 females age 18 and over, there were 99.6 males.

The median income for a household in the CDP was $93,224, and the median income for a family was $96,679. Males had a median income of $67,500 versus $41,630 for females. The per capita income for the CDP was $49,863. None of the families and 3.3% of the population were living below the poverty line, including no under eighteens and none of those over 64.

== Education ==
Most of Ames Lake is in Snoqualmie Valley School District, while a portion is in Riverview School District.
