= List of Washington locations by per capita income =

According to the Bureau of Economic Analysis, Washington's gross state product in 2024 was $854.7 billion, ranking 9th largest in the nation; per capita personal income was $83,938. Per capita income had increased from $40,837 in 2020, and $29,733 in 2010.

== Per capita income and household income ==
Washington's Per Capita Income Distribution by County

Total Washington per capita income (wikidata:Q1223) = 40,837 US$ (2020 survey methodology)
(WD = Wikidata page)

[Hide/show County Per Capita Income]
	Washington	per. US$
1	Adams County, Washington	20,592^{WD}
2	Asotin County, Washington	30,397^{WD}
3	Benton County, Washington	34,287^{WD}
4	Chelan County, Washington	32,249^{WD}
5	Clallam County, Washington	31,601^{WD}
6	Clark County, Washington	37,009^{WD}
7	Columbia County, Washington	38,606^{WD}
8	Cowlitz County, Washington	30,170^{WD}
9	Douglas County, Washington	32,709^{WD}
10	Ferry County, Washington	26,983^{WD}
11	Franklin County, Washington	25,875^{WD}
12	Garfield County, Washington	28,933^{WD}
13	Grant County, Washington	25,333^{WD}
14	Grays Harbor County, Washington	27,277^{WD}
15	Island County, Washington	38,769^{WD}
16	Jefferson County, Washington	38,176^{WD}
17	King County, Washington	55,374^{WD}
18	Kitsap County, Washington	39,993^{WD}
19	Kittitas County, Washington	32,120^{WD}
20	Klickitat County, Washington	31,021^{WD}
21	Lewis County, Washington	27,941^{WD}
22	Lincoln County, Washington	31,711^{WD}
23	Mason County, Washington	30,112^{WD}
24	Okanogan County, Washington	25,216^{WD}
25	Pacific County, Washington	28,339^{WD}
26	Pend Oreille County, Washington	30,326^{WD}
27	Pierce County, Washington	36,548^{WD}
28	San Juan County, Washington	49,148^{WD}
29	Skagit County, Washington	35,172^{WD}
30	Skamania County, Washington	34,759^{WD}
31	Snohomish County, Washington	41,126^{WD}
32	Spokane County, Washington	32,766^{WD}
33	Stevens County, Washington	28,030^{WD}
34	Thurston County, Washington	36,256^{WD}
35	Wahkiakum County, Washington	28,821^{WD}
36	Walla Walla County, Washington	30,306^{WD}
37	Whatcom County, Washington	33,241^{WD}
38	Whitman County, Washington	24,396^{WD}
39	Yakima County, Washington	24,305^{WD}

Washington economic demographics by county as of 31 December 2020
State	County	Per capita income	Median house– hold income	Total income	Population	Number of house– holds
United States		$35,384	$98,357	$120,344,871 million	340,110,988	122,354,219
Washington		$40,837	$108,286	$3,146,605 million	7,705,281	2,905,822
	Adams County	$20,592	$70,333	$4,244 million	20,613	6,035
	Asotin County	$30,397	$72,948	$6,773 million	22,285	9,286
	Benton County	$34,287	$97,068	$70,930 million	206,873	73,073
	Chelan County	$32,249	$86,786	$25,500 million	79,074	29,383
	Clallam County	$31,601	$73,445	$24,381 million	77,155	33,197
	Clark County	$37,009	$104,366	$186,270 million	503,311	178,478
	Columbia County	$38,606	$84,997	$1,525 million	3,952	1,795
	Cowlitz County	$30,170	$78,876	$33,407 million	110,730	42,354
	Douglas County	$32,709	$90,991	$14,044 million	42,938	15,435
	Ferry County	$26,983	$61,002	$1,936 million	7,178	3,175
	Franklin County	$25,875	$91,823	$25,033 million	96,749	27,263
	Garfield County	$28,933	$67,079	$661 million	2,286	986
	Grant County	$25,333	$78,697	$25,110 million	99,123	31,908
	Grays Harbor County	$27,277	$70,095	$20,631 million	75,636	29,433
	Island County	$38,769	$95,322	$33,673 million	86,857	35,326
	Jefferson County	$38,176	$83,644	$12,589 million	32,977	15,051
	King County	$55,374	$129,670	$1,256,809 million	2,269,675	969,234
	Kitsap County	$39,993	$104,223	$110,225 million	275,611	105,758
	Kittitas County	$32,120	$74,319	$14,241 million	44,337	19,162
	Klickitat County	$31,021	$76,096	$7,052 million	22,735	9,268
	Lewis County	$27,941	$73,761	$22,953 million	82,149	31,118
	Lincoln County	$31,711	$74,522	$3,448 million	10,876	4,628
	Mason County	$30,112	$78,406	$19,791 million	65,726	25,242
	Okanogan County	$25,216	$59,365	$10,616 million	42,104	17,884
	Pacific County	$28,339	$68,163	$6,621 million	23,365	9,714
	Pend Oreille County	$30,326	$70,092	$4,063 million	13,401	5,798
	Pierce County	$36,548	$101,708	$336,654 million	921,130	330,999
	San Juan County	$49,148	$103,350	$8,742 million	17,788	8,459
	Skagit County	$35,172	$92,474	$45,555 million	129,523	49,263
	Skamania County	$34,759	$85,976	$4,183 million	12,036	4,866
	Snohomish County	$41,126	$113,951	$340,505 million	827,957	298,815
	Spokane County	$32,766	$85,577	$176,719 million	539,339	206,502
	Stevens County	$28,030	$72,798	$13,018 million	46,445	17,883
	Thurston County	$36,256	$95,154	$106,880 million	294,793	112,323
	Wahkiakum County	$28,821	$67,077	$1,274 million	4,422	1,900
	Walla Walla County	$30,306	$83,285	$18,966 million	62,584	22,773
	Whatcom County	$33,241	$84,747	$75,406 million	226,847	88,978
	Whitman County	$24,396	$63,313	$11,703 million	47,973	18,485
	Yakima County	$24,305	$74,491	$62,397 million	256,728	83,765

Note: Data is automatically updated to be the latest on Wikidata. At the time of page automation this was the 2020 United States Census and the 2016–2020 American Community Survey.

== Historic per capita income and household income by location ==
Rank	County	Per capita income	Median household income	Median family income	Population (2010)	Number of households
1	King	$38,211	$68,065	$87,010	1,931,249	789,232
2	San Juan	$35,487	$50,726	$61,096	15,769	7,613
3	Snohomish	$30,635	$66,300	$77,479	713,335	268,325
4	Kitsap	$29,755	$59,549	$71,065	251,133	97,220
	Washington	$29,733	$57,244	$69,328	6,724,540	2,620,076
5	Thurston	$29,707	$60,930	$71,833	252,264	100,650
6	Island	$29,079	$57,190	$68,106	78,506	32,746
7	Jefferson	$28,528	$46,048	$59,964	29,872	14,049
8	Clark	$27,828	$58,262	$67,352	425,363	158,099
9	Pierce	$27,446	$57,869	$68,462	795,225	299,918
	United States	$27,334	$51,914	$62,982	308,745,538	116,716,292
10	Benton	$27,161	$57,354	$69,834	175,177	65,304
11	Skagit	$26,925	$54,811	$63,468	116,901	45,557
12	Columbia	$25,810	$43,611	$53,452	4,078	1,762
13	Whatcom	$25,407	$49,031	$64,586	201,140	80,370
14	Spokane	$25,127	$47,250	$59,999	471,221	187,167
15	Lincoln	$24,757	$45,582	$52,083	10,570	4,422
16	Clallam	$24,449	$44,398	$54,837	71,404	31,329
17	Chelan	$24,378	$48,674	$57,856	72,453	27,827
18	Skamania	$24,140	$48,704	$61,540	11,066	4,522
19	Asotin	$23,731	$41,665	$52,250	21,623	9,236
20	Kittitas	$23,467	$41,232	$61,276	40,915	16,595
21	Pacific	$23,326	$39,642	$51,450	20,920	9,499
22	Wahkiakum	$23,115	$40,372	$47,266	3,978	1,737
23	Walla Walla	$23,027	$45,575	$55,773	58,781	21,719
24	Cowlitz	$22,948	$45,877	$55,002	102,410	40,244
25	Garfield	$22,825	$42,269	$55,769	2,266	989
26	Pend Oreille	$22,546	$38,896	$46,971	13,001	5,479
27	Mason	$22,530	$48,104	$56,809	60,699	23,832
28	Douglas	$22,359	$48,708	$55,766	38,431	13,894
29	Stevens	$21,773	$42,845	$51,544	43,531	17,316
30	Lewis	$21,695	$43,874	$53,358	75,455	29,743
31	Grays Harbor	$21,656	$41,899	$49,745	72,797	28,579
32	Klickitat	$21,553	$37,398	$46,012	20,318	8,327
33	Okanogan	$20,093	$38,551	$48,418	41,120	16,519
34	Grant	$19,718	$42,572	$50,065	89,120	30,041
35	Whitman	$19,506	$36,368	$61,598	44,776	17,468
36	Yakima	$19,325	$42,877	$48,004	243,231	80,592
37	Franklin	$18,660	$47,749	$52,218	78,163	23,245
38	Ferry	$18,021	$35,485	$43,576	7,551	3,190
39	Adams	$16,689	$40,829	$43,551	18,728	5,720

Note: Data is from the 2010 United States Census Data and the 2006-2010 American Community Survey 5-Year Estimates.
